= Roman Catholic Diocese of Castro di Sardegna =

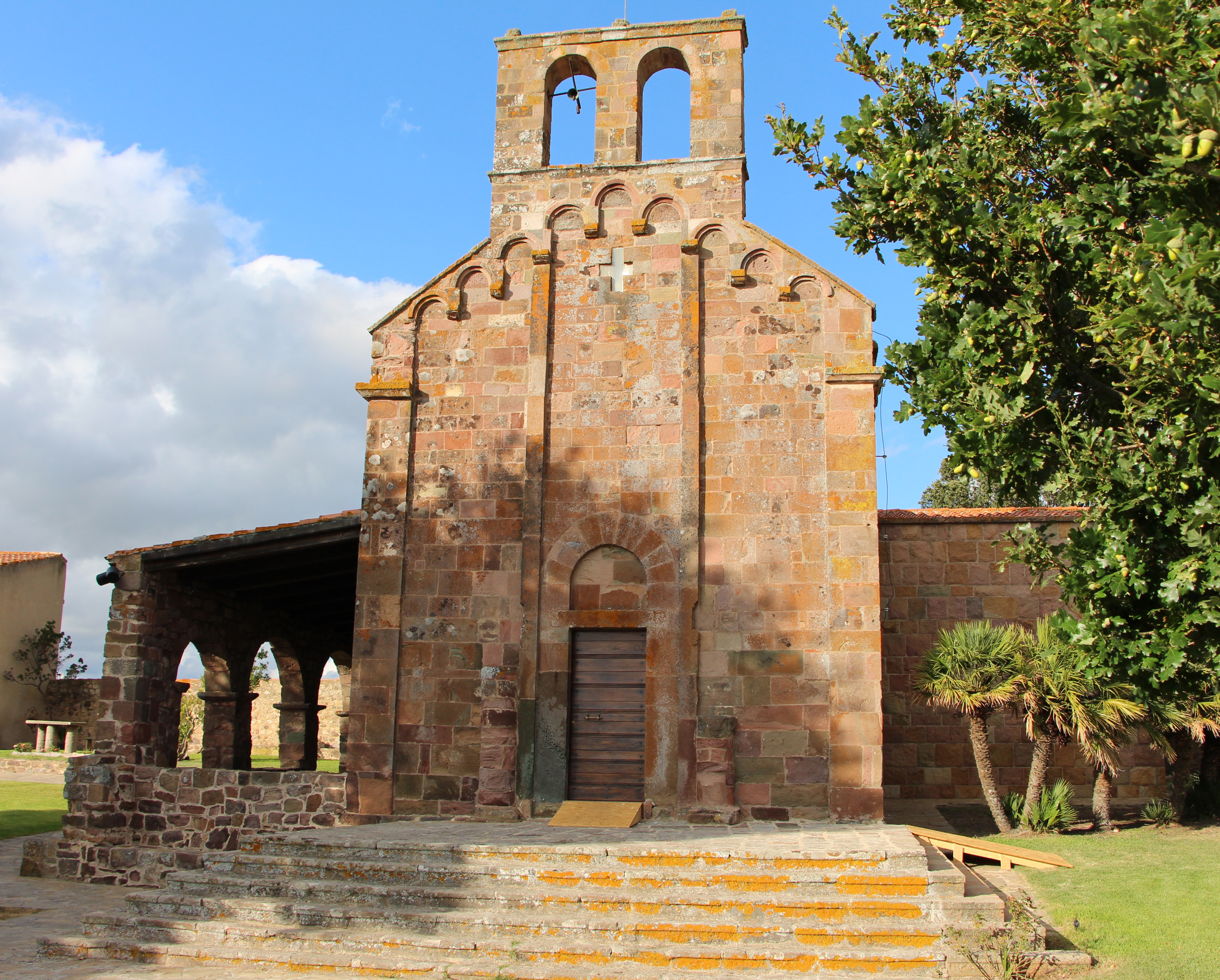
Former cathedral of Our Lady of Castro

The Diocese of Castro di Sardegna (Latin: Dioecesis Castrensis) was a Roman Catholic diocese located in the town of Oschiri in the Province of Sassari in the Italian region of Sardinia. In 1503, it was suppressed along with the Diocese of Bisarcio and the Diocese of Ottana to form the Diocese of Alghero.

== History ==
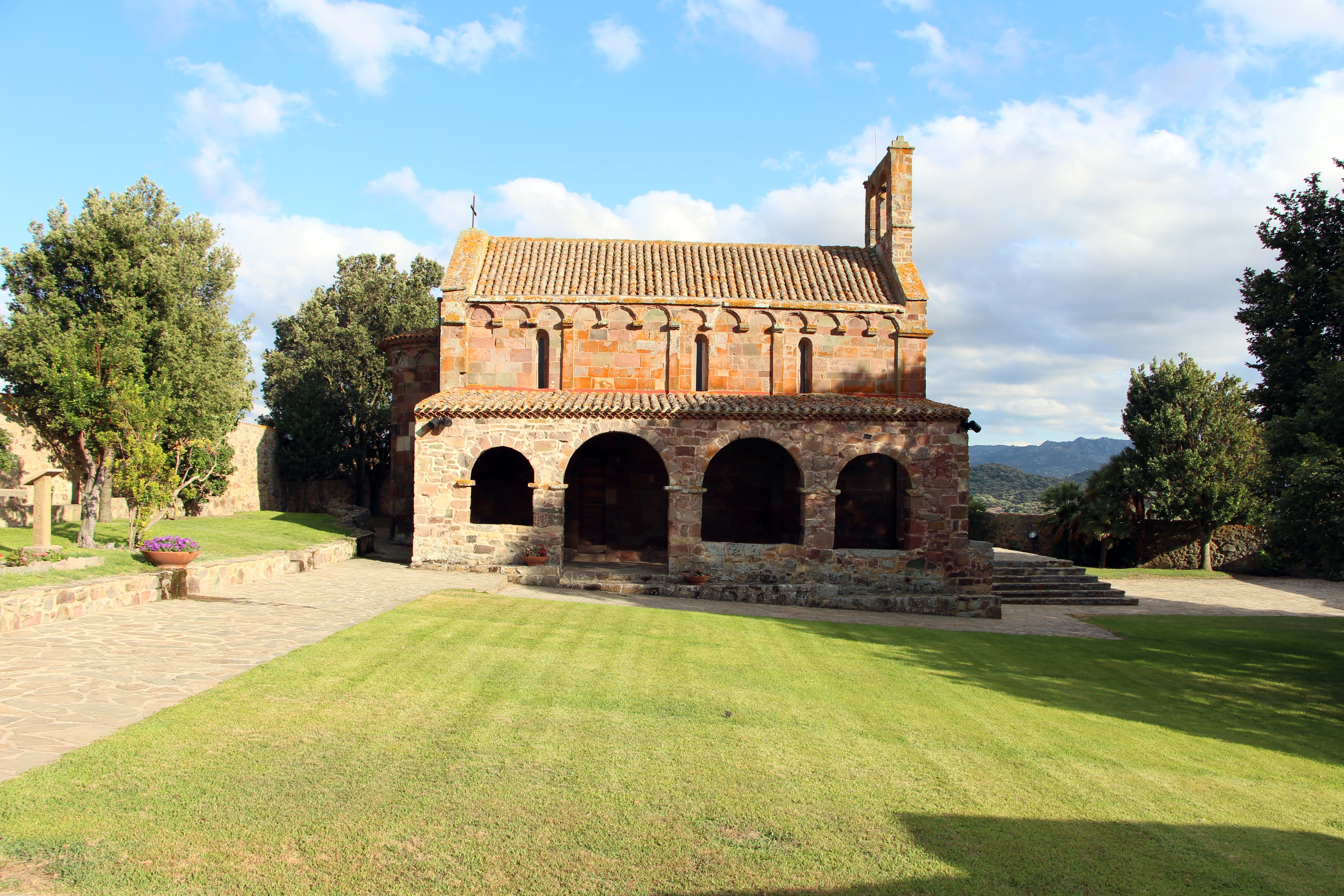
Our Lady of Castro

Within the comune of Oschiri is the church of Nostra Signora di Castro, which was once the cathedral of the diocese, centred on the town of Castro, which has now been depopulated. It was suffragan of the Metropolitan Archdiocese of Sassari (Torres, Turritanensis).

The time of the establishment of the diocese of Castro is unknown. The earliest mention of a bishop of Castro occurs in a document of 1116, when an unnamed bishop of the see assisted at the dedication of the Basilica di Saccargia. In 1164, its bishop Atto dedicated a church in the locality of Aneleto and granted it in the following year to Camaldolese monks.

On 5 April 1297, Pope Boniface VIII granted the island of Sardinia, which was the property of the Holy Roman Church, in feudal tenure to King James II of Aragon. The kings of Aragon claimed the right to nominate candidates to vacant bishoprics in Sardinia, and in one case, in 1482, Ferdinand II of Aragon was refused his nomination to the See of Ottana by Pope Sixtus IV.

Castro later decayed, and the bishop's residence was transferred to Bono (Civil province of Sassari).

Bishop Leonardus de Sassari, O.Min. (1412–1445) held a diocesan synod on 9 March 1420, in the Church of San Michele in the town of Bono.

On 8 December 1503, Pope Julius II issued the bull "Aequum Reputamus", in which the territory of Castro and that of two other dioceses were combined to form the new diocese of Alghero, (since 1986, the diocese of Alghero-Bosa). Today what was the territory of Castro is part of that of the diocese of Ozieri

=== Titular see ===
Castro itself, no longer a residential bishopric. In 1968, the name "Castro," but not the actual diocese, was revived as a titular see. Since 1976, its name has been Castro di Sardegna, avoiding confusion with dioceses named Castro in Lazio and in Puglia.

== Bishops ==
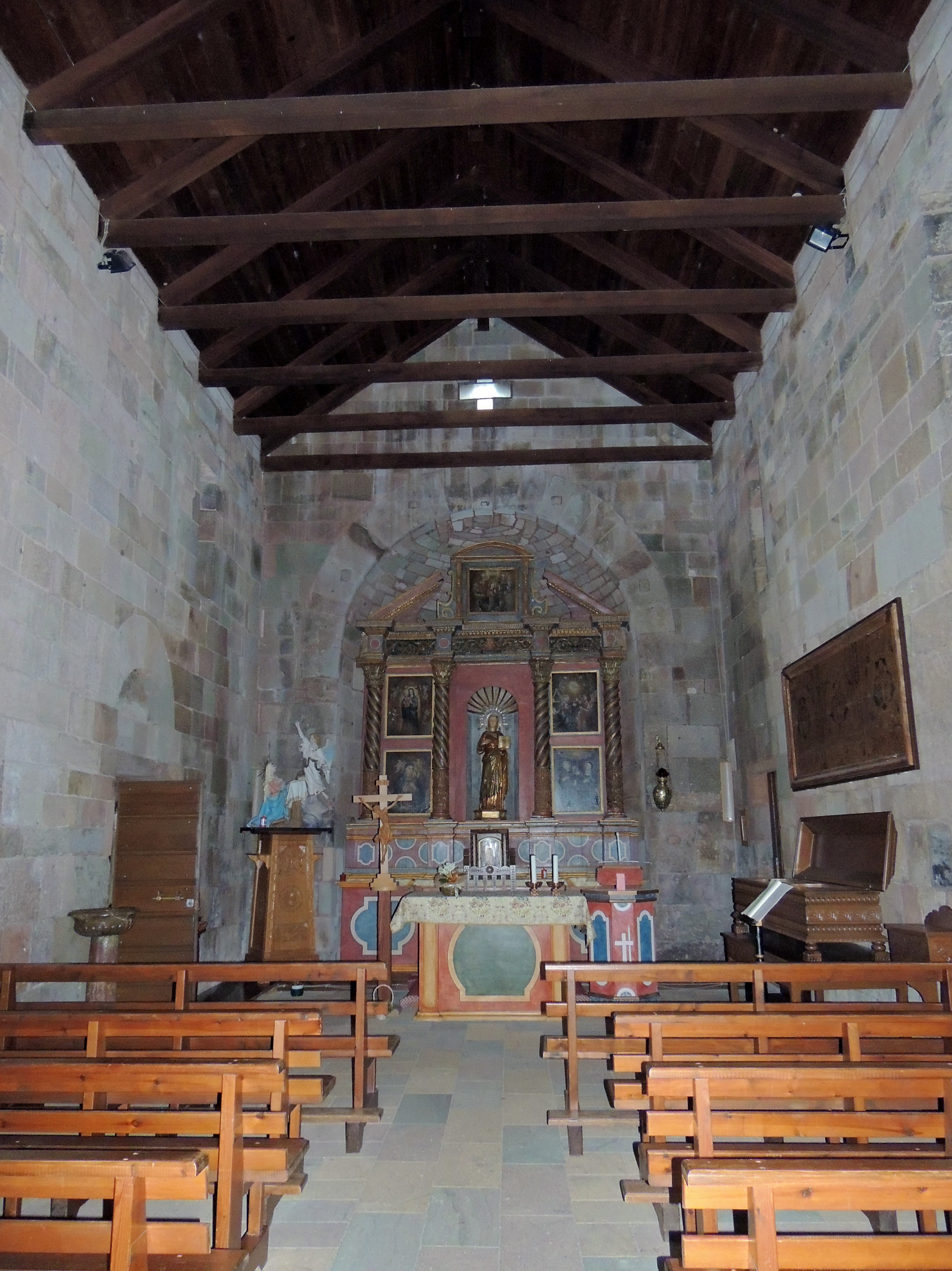
Our Lady of Castro - interior

=== Diocese of Castro di Sardegna ===
- [ Ignotus (1112) ]
- Adam (1127)
- Atho (1161–1179)
- Raimundus, O.S.B.Vallomb.
- Torgodorius (1231)
- [ Ignotus (1248) ]
- Marthucus (1259, 1264)
- Bernardus (1348)
- Franciscus Joannis, O.Min. (1358–1359)
- Comita de Odis (1359–1362)
- Nicolaus de Varis, O.Min. (1362)
- Augustinus
- Rainerius (1391–1412)
- Simon Margens (1395–1402)
- Antonius (1402–1412)
- Leonardus de Sassari, O.Min. (1412–1445)
- Francesco, O.S.B. (1445–1447)
- Giovanni Gasto, O.F.M. (1447–1455)
- Tommaso Giliberti, O. Cist. (1455–1458)
- Leonardo (1458–1464)
- Lorenzo di Moncada, O.F.M. (1464–1478)
- Cristoforo Magno (1478–1483)
- Bernardo Jover (1483–1490)
- Juan Crespo, O.S.A. (1490–1493 Appointed, Bishop of Ales)
- Melchiorre di Tremps, O.S.A. (1493–1496 Died)
- Giovanni Garsia, O.S.B. (1496–1501)
- Antonio de Toro, O.F.M. (1501–1503 Resigned)

8 December 1503: Suppressed along with the Diocese of Bisarcio and the Diocese of Ottana to form the Diocese of Alghero

=== Titular bishops ===
- Alfonso Sánchez Peña (1969–1997)
- Giuseppe Pittau, S.J. (1998–2014)
- Dominicus Meier, O.S.B. (2015–2024)
- Andreas Geßmann (2024– ...)

== See also ==
- Diocese of Alghero-Bosa
- Catholic Church in Italy

== Sources ==
- Amadu, Francesco (1984). La diocesi mediovale di Castro. (in Italian) Ozieri: Edizione Il Torchietto 1984.
- Cappelletti, Giuseppe (1857). Le chiese d'Italia dalla loro origine sino ai nostri giorni (in Italian). Vol. decimoterzo (13). Venezia: Antonelli. pp. 145–146..
- Eubel, Conradus, ed. (1913). Hierarchia catholica (in Latin). Vol. 1 (Tomus 1) (second ed.). Münster: Libreria Regensbergiana. p. 174.. Archived.
- Eubel, Conradus, ed. (1914). Hierarchia catholica (in Latin). Vol. 2 (Tomus 2) (second ed.). Münster: Libreria Regensbergiana. p. 121.. Archived.
- Eubel, Conradus, ed. (1923). Hierarchia catholica (in Latin). Vol. 3 (Tomus 3) (second ed.). Münster: Libreria Regensbergiana. p. 158 with note 1.. Archived.
- Gams, Pius Bonifacius (1873). Series episcoporum ecclesiæ catholicæ, quotquot innotuerunt a beato Petro apostolo. (in Latin). Ratisbon: Georg Joseph Manz 1873 (reprinted several times).
- Mattei, Antonio Felice (1758). Sardinia sacra, seu De episcopis Sardis historia nunc primò confecta a F. Antonio Felice Matthaejo. (in Latin). Romae: ex typographia Joannis Zempel apud Montem Jordanum, 1758. Pp. 207-213.
- Laner, F. (2004). Nostra Signora di Castro. Chiesa ex cattedrale ad Oschiri. Edizioni Adrastea, Mestre.
- Solmi, Arrigo (1917). Studi storici sulle istituzioni della Sardegna nel medio evo. (in Italian). Cagliari: Presso La Società storica Sarda 1917.
- Scano, Dionigi (1940, 1941). Codice diplomatico delle Relazioni fra la Santa Sede e la Sardegna. 2 vols. Cagliari: Arti Grafiche B.C.T. 1940.
- Sotgia, Giovanni Daniel (2014). La diocesi medievale di Castro: dalle origini all'"Iberizzazione" delle istituzioni (secc. X-XVI) Dissertation: Università degli Studi di Padova 2014.
