= Ottana =

Ottana Otzàna (Sardinian)
- Comune
- Comune di Ottana
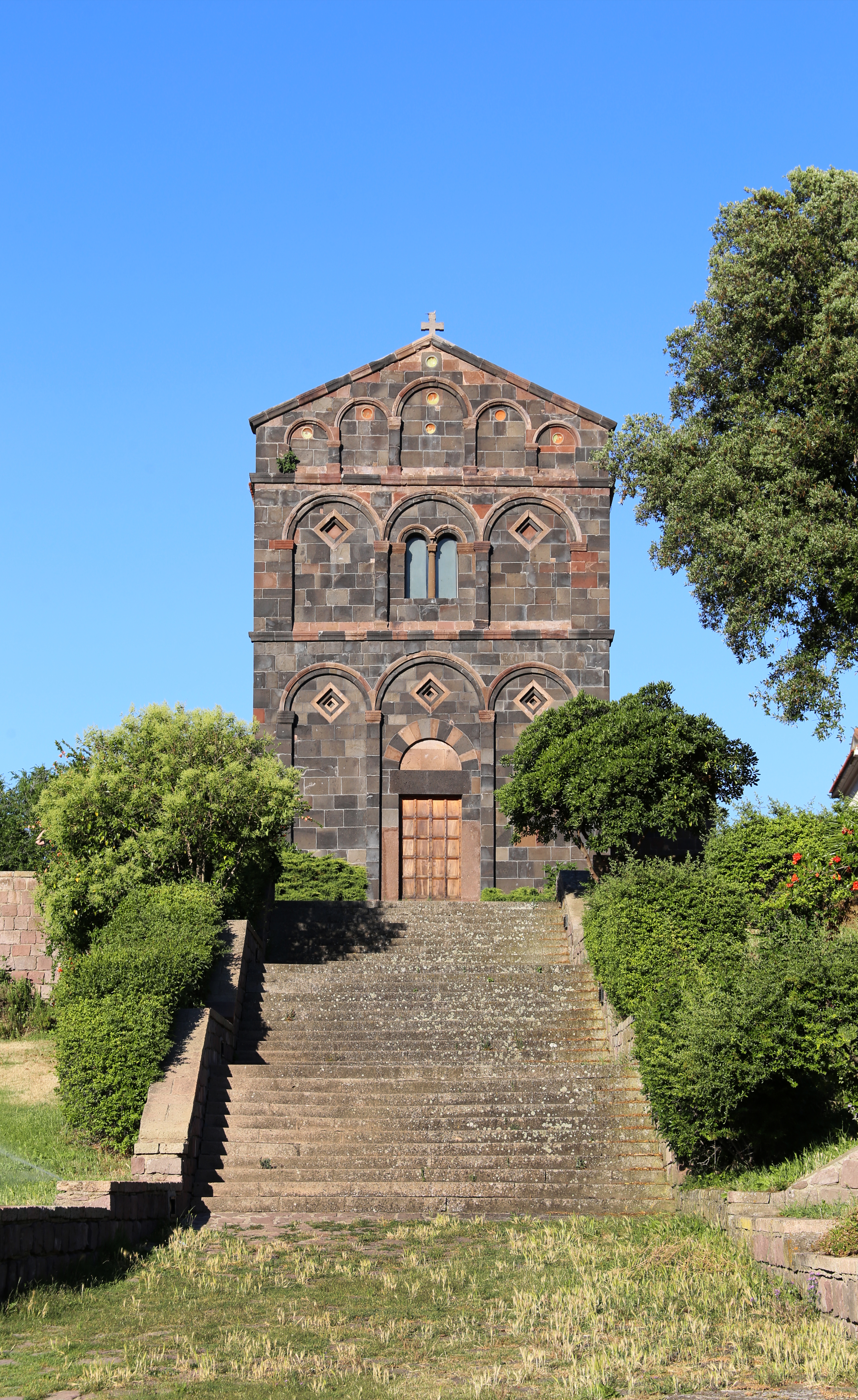
- Church of San Nicola

- Location within Sardinia
- Coordinates: 40°14′N 9°2′E
- Country: Italy
- Region: Sardinia
- Province: Nuoro (NU)
- Frazioni: Etfas

Government
  - Mayor: Gian Paolo Marras

Area
  - Total: 45.07 km^{2} (17.40 sq mi)
- Elevation: 185 m (607 ft)

Population (2026)
  - Total: 2,147
  - Density: 47.64/km^{2} (123.4/sq mi)
- Demonym: Ottanesi
- Time zone: UTC+1 (CET)
  - Summer (DST): UTC+2 (CEST)
- Postal code: 08020
- Dialing code: 0784
- Website: Official website

Ottana (Sardinian: Otzàna) is a town and comune (municipality), former bishopric and Latin titular see in the Province of Nuoro in the autonomous island region of Sardinia in Italy. It is located about 110 kilometres (68 mi) north of Cagliari and about 25 kilometres (16 mi) southwest of Nuoro. It has 2,147 inhabitants.

The town is known for its traditional carnival costumes, including distinctive masks worn by the Boes, Merdules and Filonzana.

Ottana borders the municipalities of Bolotana, Noragugume, Olzai, Orani, Sarule, and Sedilo.

== Demographics ==
As of 2026, the population is 2,147, of which 50.0% are male, and 50.0% are female. Minors make up 13.0% of the population, and seniors make up 27.4%.

Historical population

Year	Pop.	±%
1861	1,005	—
1871	1,008	+0.3%
1881	1,062	+5.4%
1901	1,085	+2.2%
1911	1,259	+16.0%
1921	1,232	−2.1%
1931	1,238	+0.5%
1936	1,314	+6.1%

Year	Pop.	±%
1951	1,566	+19.2%
1961	1,894	+20.9%
1971	2,081	+9.9%
1981	2,608	+25.3%
1991	2,601	−0.3%
2001	2,526	−2.9%
2011	2,384	−5.6%
2021	2,199	−7.8%

Source: ISTAT

=== Immigration ===
As of 2025, immigrants make up 6.0% of the population. The 5 largest foreign countries of birth are Belgium, Germany, France, Morocco, and Romania.

== Religion ==
The date of the establishment of the diocese of Ottana (Othana in Latin) is unknown, but it was in existence by the first decade of the 12th century. It was a suffragan of the archbishop of Torres (Sassari).

Bishop Antonio di Alcalà held a diocesan synod on 3 June 1475.

Pope Julius II, in his papal bull "Aequum Reputamus" of 8 December 1503, suppressed the diocese of Bisarcio, the Diocese of Castro, and Diocese of Ottana. Their territories, and some from the Archdiocese of Sassari, were combined and reassigned to establish the Diocese of Alghero. Alghero was made a suffragan of Sassari. Ottana was no longer a cathedral city. The town was in a malarial zone, and it gradually lost nearly all of its population in thr 16th century.

Ottana is the site of the Romanesque church of San Nicola, built c. 1150.

=== Bishops of Ottana ===
- Giovanni (1116)
- Ugo (1139)
- Zaccaria (1170)
- Ugo (1176)
- Gregorio (1205)
- Gonario (16 June 1231 – ?)
- Costantino (1237? – ?)
- Silvestro (1340)
- Francesco (13 June 1344 – ?)
- Pietro (14 January 1359 – ?)
- Arnaldo Simone, O.P. (13 February 1355 – ?)
- Giovanni Lavoratore, O.F.M. (1386 –1389 ?), Avignon Obedience
- Domenico (26 May 1386 – 1388), Roman Obedience
- Giovanni (26 June 1388 – ? ), Roman Obedience
- Nicola (1389 – 1400) Avignon Obedience
- Gerardo di Gisarchio (Gérard de Gisors), O. Carm. (1390 – 1402) Avignon Obedience
- Biagio Spano (1400 – ?), Roman Obedience
- Simone Mancha, O.S.B. Vall. (11 February 1429 – 1454)
- Giovanni de Salinis, O.F.M. (1454 – 1471
- Antonio di Alcala (25 August 1472 – 1475)
- Gerolamo di Setgi, O.F.M. (8 September 1475 – c. 1480)
- Ludovico Camagni, O.F.M. (7 February 1481 – 1483)
- Domenico di Milia (11 September 1483 – ?)
- Giovanni Perez (23 July 1501 – 1503)

=== Titular see ===
In October 2004, the title, but not the diocese itself, was restored as a Latin titular bishopric, named Ottana in Italian, or Othana in Latin.

Holders of the title include:

- Lorenzo Ghizzoni (17 February 2006 – 17 November 2012)
- Piotr Sawczuk (19 January 2013 – 17 June 2019)

== Sources ==
- Cappelletti, Giuseppe (1857). Le chiese d'Italia dalla loro origine sino ai nostri giorni (in Italian). Vol. decimoterzo (13). Venezia: Antonelli. pp. 142–144..
- Eubel, Conradus, ed. (1913). Hierarchia catholica (in Latin). Vol. 1 (Tomus 1) (second ed.). Münster: Libreria Regensbergiana. p. 208.. Archived.
- Eubel, Conradus, ed. (1914). Hierarchia catholica (in Latin). Vol. 2 (Tomus 2) (second ed.). Münster: Libreria Regensbergiana. p. 125.. Archived.
- Eubel, Conradus, ed. (1923). Hierarchia catholica (in Latin). Vol. 3 (Tomus 3) (second ed.). Münster: Libreria Regensbergiana. p. 265.. Archived.
- Lai, Roberto (2013). La Diocesi medievale di Ottana e la cronotassi dei suoi vescovi (1065-1503). (in Italian). Logus mondi interattivi, 2013.
- Merche, Salvatore (1923). Cenni storici sull'antico vescovado di Ottana e nuovo elenco critico dei suoi vescovi. Cagliari: G. Ledda, 1923.
- Pintus, Sebastiano (1909). "Vescovi di Ottana e di Alghero," (in Italian), in: Archivio storico sardo Vol. 5 (1909), pp. 106-111.

=== External links ===
- Chow, Gabriel. GCatholic.org, "Bishops of Ottana"; retrieved: 13 December 2025..
