= Giacomo de Podio =

Most Reverend Giacomo de Podio
- Bishop of Sorres
- Church: Catholic Church
- Diocese: Diocese of Sorres
- In office: 1461–1497

Personal details
- Died: 1497 Sorres, Italy

Giacomo de Podio (died 1497) was a Roman Catholic prelate who served as Bishop of Sorres (1461–1497).

== Biography ==
On 28 Mar 1461, Giacomo de Podio was appointed during the papacy of Pope Pius II as Bishop of Sorres. He served as Bishop of Sorres until his death in 1497.

Catholic Church titles
Preceded by	Bishop of Sorres; 1461–1497	Succeeded by
