= Antonio Vacca =

Italian bishop (1934–2020)

- Bishop of Alghero-Bosa
- Church: Catholic Church
- Diocese: Diocese of Alghero-Bosa
- In office: 18 February 1993 – 29 September 2006
- Predecessor: Giovanni Pes
- Successor: Giacomo Lanzetti
- Previous post: Apostolic Administrator of Sassari (2004)

Orders
- Ordination: 28 July 1957 by Paolo Botto
- Consecration: 21 March 1993 by Ottorino Pietro Alberti

Personal details
- Born: 8 August 1934 Quartu Sant'Elena, Province of Cagliari, Kingdom of Italy
- Died: 22 December 2020 (aged 86) Cagliari, Sardinia, Italy

Antonio Vacca (8 August 1934 – 22 December 2020) was an Italian Roman Catholic bishop.

Vacca was born in Italy and was ordained to the priesthood in 1957. He served as bishop of the Roman Catholic Diocese of Alghero-Bosa, Italy, from 1994 to 2006.

He died of throat cancer.
