= Luis Manuel Fernández de Portocarrero =

Spanish Catholic cardinal (1635–1709)

His Eminence Luis Manuel Fernández de Portocarrero KOHS GE
- Archbishop of Toledo; Primate of Spain
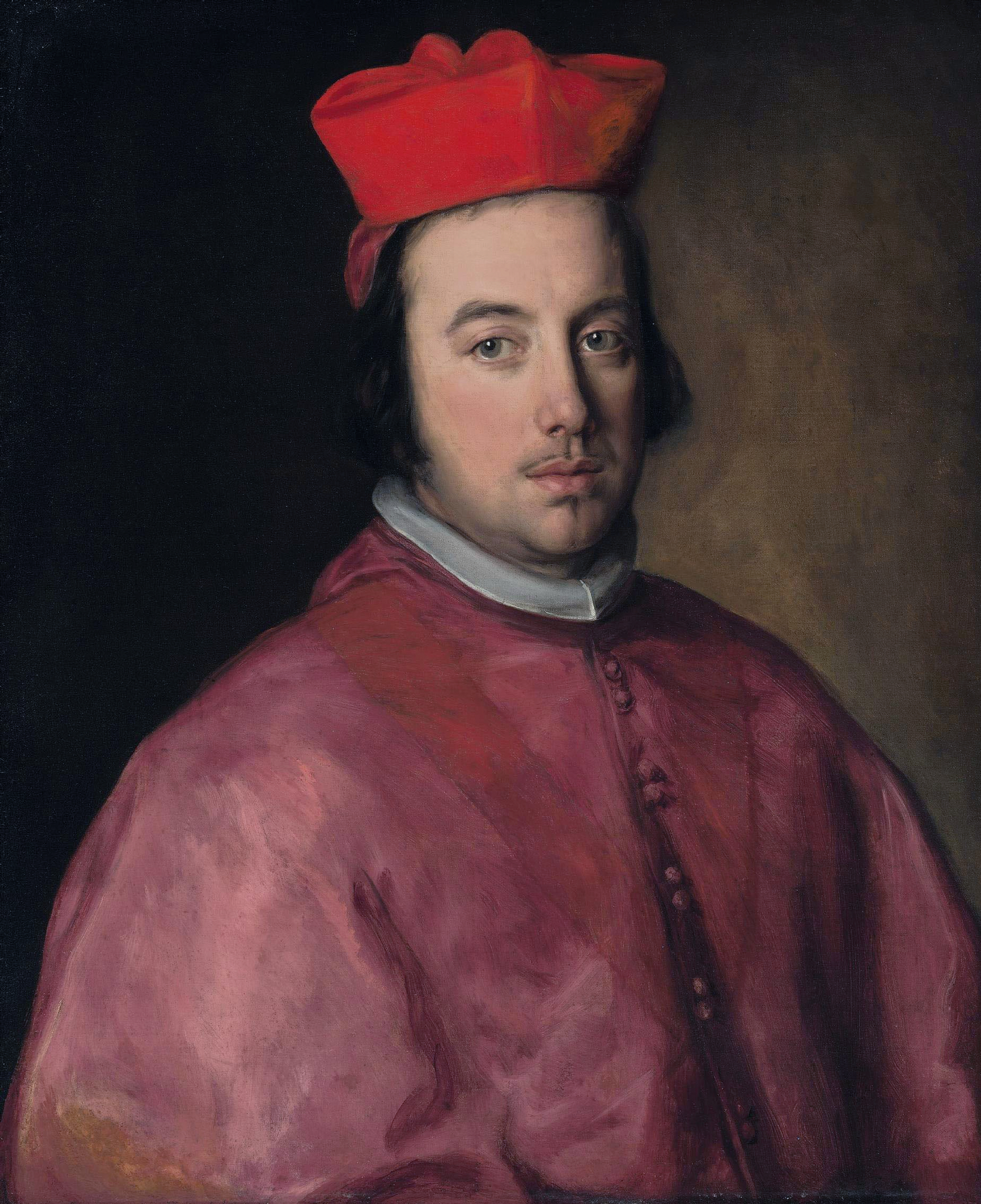
- Portrait by Jacob Ferdinand Voet
- Church: Roman Catholic Church
- Archdiocese: Toledo
- Province: Toledo
- Appointed: 1677
- Term ended: 1709
- Predecessor: Pascual de Aragón
- Successor: Francisco Valero y Losa
- Other posts: Cardinal-Bishop of Palestrina (1698–1709)

Orders
- Consecration: 16 January 1678
- Created cardinal: 5 August 1669 by Pope Clement IX
- Rank: Cardinal-Bishop

Personal details
- Born: Luis Manuel Fernández de Portocarrero y de Guzmán; 8 January 1635 Palma del Río, Spain
- Died: 14 September 1709 (aged 74) Toledo, Spain
- Coat of arms

Governor of the Realm
- In office 1 September 1701 – 17 January 1703
- Monarch: Philip V

Lieutenant General of the Realm
- In office 1 November 1700 – 18 February 1701
- Preceded by: Charles II (as King)
- Succeeded by: Philip V (as King)

Luis Manuel Fernández de Portocarrero y de Guzmán (8 January 1635, Palma del Río – 14 September 1709, Toledo, Spain) was a Spanish prelate, who was cardinal archbishop of Toledo. Uncle of Luis Antonio Tomás de Portocarrero y Moscoso, 5th Count, who became a Grandee of Spain, 2nd class, since 1707 by King Felipe V of Spain.

== Biography ==
A younger son of the 1st marquis of Almenara, title of 11 July 1623, and 3rd Count of Palma del Rio, title of 22 November 1507, Luis Andres. He became dean of Toledo early, and was made cardinal on 5 August 1669.

Till 1677 he lived at Rome as cardinal protector of the Spanish nation. In 1677 he was appointed interim viceroy of Sicily, counsellor of state and archbishop of Toledo. He ceased to be viceroy of Sicily in 1678, being replaced by Vicente de Gonzaga y Doria, (1602–1694) former Viceroy of Catalonia, 1664–1667, not to be confounded with his nephew Vincenzo Gonzaga, Duke of Guastalla, (1634–1714). On 16 January 1678, he was consecrated bishop by Jaime de Palafox y Cardona, Archbishop of Palermo, with Giovanni Roano e Corrionero, Archbishop of Monreale, and Francesco Arata, Bishop of Lipari, serving as co-consecrators. As archbishop of Toledo he exerted himself to protect the clergy from the obligation to pay the excises or octroi duties known as "the millions" and thereby helped to perpetuate the financial embarrassments of the government.

His position rather than any personal qualities enabled him to play an important part in a great crisis of European politics. The decrepit King Charles II was childless, and the disposal of his inheritance became a question of great interest to the European powers. Fernández de Portocarrero was induced to become a supporter of the French party, which desired that the crown should be left to one of the family of Louis XIV, and not to a member of the king's own family, the Habsburgs. The great authority of Fernández de Portocarrero as cardinal and primate of Spain was used to persuade, or rather to terrify the unhappy king into making a will in favor of the duke of Anjou, Philip V.

He acted as regent until the new king reached Spain and hoped to be powerful under his rule. But the king's French advisers were aware that Spain required a thorough financial and administrative reform. Fernández de Portocarrero could not see, and indeed had not either the intelligence or the honesty to see, the necessity. He was incapable, obstinate and perfectly selfish. The new rulers soon found that he must be removed and he was ordered to return to his diocese. When in 1706 the Austrian party appeared likely to gain the upper hand, Fernández de Portocarrero was led by spite and vexation to go over to them.

When fortune changed he returned to his allegiance to Philip V, and as the government was unwilling to offend the Church he escaped banishment. In 1709 when Louis XIV made a pretence of withdrawing from the support of his grandson, the cardinal made a great display of loyalty. He died in September of the same year and by his orders the words Hic jacet pulvis, cinis, et nihil were put on his tomb (here lies dust, ashes and nothing).

== Episcopal succession ==
Episcopal succession of Luis Manuel Fernández de Portocarrero

While bishop, he was the principal consecrator of:

- Francisco Zapata Vera y Morales, Titular Bishop of Dara and Auxiliary Bishop of Toledo (1680);
- Juan Marín y Rodezno, Bishop of Badajoz (1681);
- Benito Ignacio Salazar Goiri, Bishop of Barcelona (1683);
- Anselmo Gómez de la Torre, Bishop of Tuy (1690);
- Francesco di Sobrecasas, Archbishop of Cagliari (1690);
- José de Barcia y Zambrana, Bishop of Cádiz (1691);
- Pedro Portocarrero y Guzmán, Titular Archbishop of Tyrus and Patriarch of West Indies (1691);
- Toribio de Mier, Bishop of Pamplona (1693);
- Bartolomé Espejos y Cisneros, Bishop of Málaga (1693);
- José de Jesús María Fajardo, Bishop of Alghero (1693);
- Pedro de Palacios y Tenorio, Bishop of Guadix (1693);
- Damián Francisco Cornejo, Bishop of Orense (1694);
- Bartolomé de Ocampo y Mata, Bishop of Segovia (1695); and
- Ildefonso de Talavera, Bishop of Cádiz (1696).

He also presided over the priestly ordination of:

- Patrick O'Shea (1690), later Bishop of Ossory.

Catholic Church titles
Preceded by Scipione Pannocchieschi d'Elci	Cardinal-Priest of Santa Sabina; 1670–1698	Succeeded by Francesco del Giudice
Preceded by Pascual de Aragón-Córdoba-Cardona y Fernández de Córdoba	Archbishop of Toledo; 1677–1709	Succeeded by Francisco Valero y Losa
Preceded by Paluzzo Paluzzi Altieri Degli Albertoni	Cardinal-Bishop of Palestrina; 1698–1709	Succeeded by Fabrizio Spada
