= Military Ordinariate of Italy =

Catholic ecclesiastical jurisdiction

Military Ordinariate in Italy Ordinariato Militare in Italia

Catholic
- The coat of arms of the Military Ordinariate in Italy

Location
- Country: Italy
- Ecclesiastical province: Immediately exempt to the Holy See

Information
- Denomination: Catholic Church
- Sui iuris church: Latin Church
- Rite: Multiple (Primarily Roman Rite)
- Established: 6 March 1925 (101 years ago)

Current leadership
- Pope: Leo XIV
- Archbishop: Gian Franco Saba

Website
- www.ordinariato.it

The Military Ordinariate in Italy (Italian: Ordinariato Militare in Italia) is a Latin Church military ordinariate of the Catholic Church in Italy. It provides pastoral care to Catholics serving in the Italian Armed Forces and their families. The ordinariate is immediately exempt to the Holy See.

== History ==
It was established as a military vicariate on 6 March 1925, but the first military vicar was not appointed until 23 April 1929. It was elevated to a military ordinariate on 21 July 1986. The Episcopal seat is located at the Church of St. Catharine of Siena in Magnanapoli (Chiesa Principale di Santa Catarina da Siena a Magnanapoli) in Rome, Italy.

== Office holders ==
=== Military vicars ===
- Angelo Bartolomasi (appointed 23 April 1929 – retired 1944)
- Carlo Alberto Ferrero di Cavallerleone (appointed 28 October 1944 – resigned 4 November 1953)
- Arrigo Pintonello (appointed 4 November 1953 – appointed Apostolic Administrator of Velletri 1 May 1965)
- Luigi Maffeo (appointed 16 January 1966 – died 7 May 1971)
- Mario Schierano (appointed 28 August 1971 – resigned 27 October 1981)
- Gaetano Bonicelli (appointed 28 October 1981 – became Military Ordinary 21 July 1986)

=== Military ordinaries ===
- Gaetano Bonicelli (appointed 21 July 1986 – translated to the Archdiocese of Siena-Colle di Val d'Elsa-Montalcino 14 November 1989)
- Giovanni Marra (appointed 14 November 1989 – resigned 31 January 1996)
- Giuseppe Mani (appointed 31 January 1996 – translated to the Archdiocese of Cagliari 20 June 2003)
- Angelo Bagnasco (appointed 20 June 2003 – translated to the Archdiocese of Genoa 29 August 2006)
- Vincenzo Pelvi (appointed 14 October 2006 – retired 11 August 2013)
- Santo Marcianò (appointed 10 October 2013 – retired 10 April 2025)
- Gian Franco Saba (appointed 10 April 2025 – Present)
