= Pintor =

Pintor is a surname. Notable people with the surname include:

- Luigi Pintor (politician, born 1925) (1925–2003), Italian politician and journalist
- Lupe Pintor (born 1955), Mexican boxer
- Pietro Pintor (1880–1940), Italian general
- Sergio Pintor (1937–2020), Italian Roman Catholic bishop
