= Gian Franco Saba =

His Excellency Gian Franco Saba
- Archbishop of Sassari
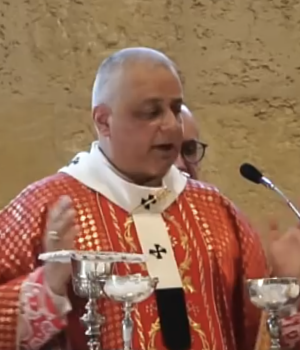
- Church: Roman Catholic Church
- Archdiocese: Sassari
- In office: 27 June 2017
- Predecessor: Paolo Mario Virgilio Atzei, O.F.M.Conv.
- Previous posts: Rector of diocesan Seminary, Sassari; Rector of Regional pontifical Seminary of Sardinia

Orders
- Ordination: 23 October 1993
- Consecration: 13 September 2017 by Sebastiano Sanguinetti

Personal details
- Born: 20 September 1968 (age 58) Olbia
- Education: Pontifical Faculty of Theology of Sardinia; Patristic Institute Augustinianum; Institut Catholique de Paris
- Motto: Dilectione amplectere Deum
- Coat of arms

Styles of Gian Franco Saba
- Reference style: The Most Reverend
- Spoken style: Your Excellency
- Religious style: Monsignor
- Posthumous style: none

Gianfranco Saba is from 27 June 2017 the elected Archbishop of Sassari.

== Family life ==
Gianfranco Saba was born in Olbia in 1968, and was ordained as a priest in 1993. He continued his theological studies at Pontifical Faculty of Theology of Sardinia, and specialized at Patristic Institute Augustinianum. He also specialized at Institut Catholique de Paris.

He was rector of diocesan Seminary of Sassari and from 2000 to 2015 he was rector of Regional pontifical Seminary of Sardinia.

== Ministry ==
On 27 June 2017 Pope Francis appointed him as the new Archbishop of Sassari. He was consecrated on 13 September 2017 by bishop of Ozieri Sebastiano Sanguinetti and installed on October 1, 2017.

In November 2024, Saba announced Pope Francis' judgment expelling Argentine priest, Fernando María Cornet from clerical state for schism (1983 Code of Canon Law Canons 751 & 1364) due to his “Habemus Antipapam?” publication.

== Publications ==
- Il dialogo sul sacerdozio di Giovanni Crisostomo: sintesi tra paideia classica e paideia cristiana?, Bologna, Dehoniana Libri, 2012, ISBN 978-88-89386-44-6.
- Scienze religiose e processo euromediterraneo, curatela, Soveria Mannelli, Rubbettino, 2009, ISBN 978-88-498-2850-4.
- Albino Morera: l'uomo e il pastore nel contesto socio-religioso nella Diocesi di Tempio-Ampurias, curatela con Angelo Setzi, Soveria Mannelli, Rubbettino, 2004, ISBN 88-498-0646-9.

Catholic Church titles
Preceded by Paolo Mario Virgilio Atzei, O.F.M.Conv.	Archbishop of Sassari; 2017–present	Succeeded by -
