= Sebastiano Dho =

Italian priest (1935–2021)

- Bishop of Alba Pompeia
- Church: Catholic Church
- Diocese: Diocese of Alba Pompeia
- In office: 3 July 1993 – 28 June 2010
- Predecessor: Giulio Nicolini
- Successor: Giacomo Lanzetti
- Previous post: Bishop of Saluzzo (1986-1993)

Orders
- Ordination: 29 June 1958
- Consecration: 24 August 1986 by Anastasio Ballestrero

Personal details
- Born: 16 May 1935 Frabosa Soprana, Province of Cuneo, Kingdom of Italy
- Died: 31 August 2021 (aged 86) Mondovì, Province of Cuneo, Italy

Sebastiano Dho (16 May 1935 – 31 August 2021) was an Italian Roman Catholic bishop and prelate. He served as the Bishop of the Roman Catholic Diocese of Saluzzo, based in Saluzzo, from 1986 to 1993. He was then appointed Bishop of the Roman Catholic Diocese of Alba Pompeia from 3 July 1993, until his retirement on 28 June 2010.

Born in Frabosa Soprana in 1935, Dho was ordained a Catholic priest in 1958. He died at the Santa Teresa Institute in Mondovì, Piedmont on 31 August 2021 at the age of 86. He had been hospitalized at the Regina Montis Regalis hospital in Mondovì during the weeks prior to his death as his health deteriorated.
