= Bosa Cathedral =

Roman Catholic cathedral in Bosa, Sardinia, Italy

Coordinates: 40.295278°N 8.503889°E

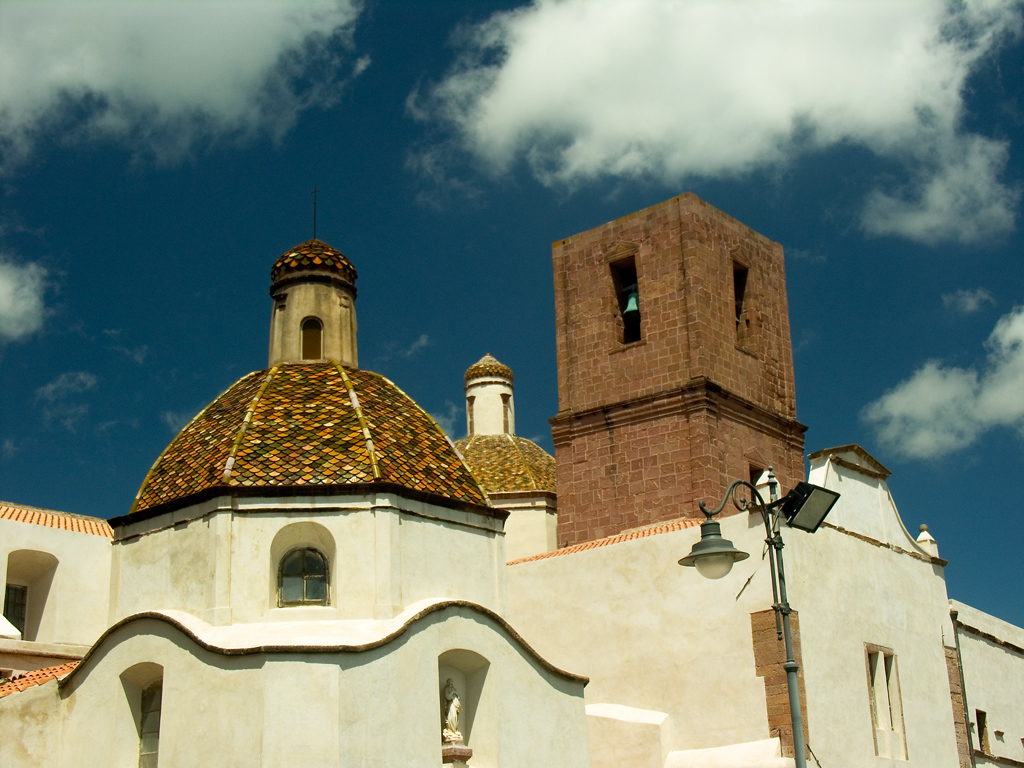
Cathedral from the east

Bosa Cathedral, dedicated to the Immaculate Conception (Italian: Duomo di Bosa, Concattedrale dell'Immacolata Concezione), is a Roman Catholic cathedral in Bosa, Sardinia, Italy. It is a co-cathedral of the Diocese of Alghero-Bosa; before the creation of the merged diocese in 1986 it was the seat of the Bishop of Bosa.

The cathedral stands in the historical town centre of Bosa, between the Corso Vittorio Emanuele II and the River Temo, at the height of the 19th-century bridge.

== History ==
The origins of the cathedral lie in the 12th century, but the building has been substantially altered many times, particularly during the 15th century. The present building is the product of restorations carried out from 1803 onwards by the local architect Salvatore Are. The cathedral was re-consecrated in 1809. The decorations and furnishings were completed during the rest of the 19th century.

== Description ==
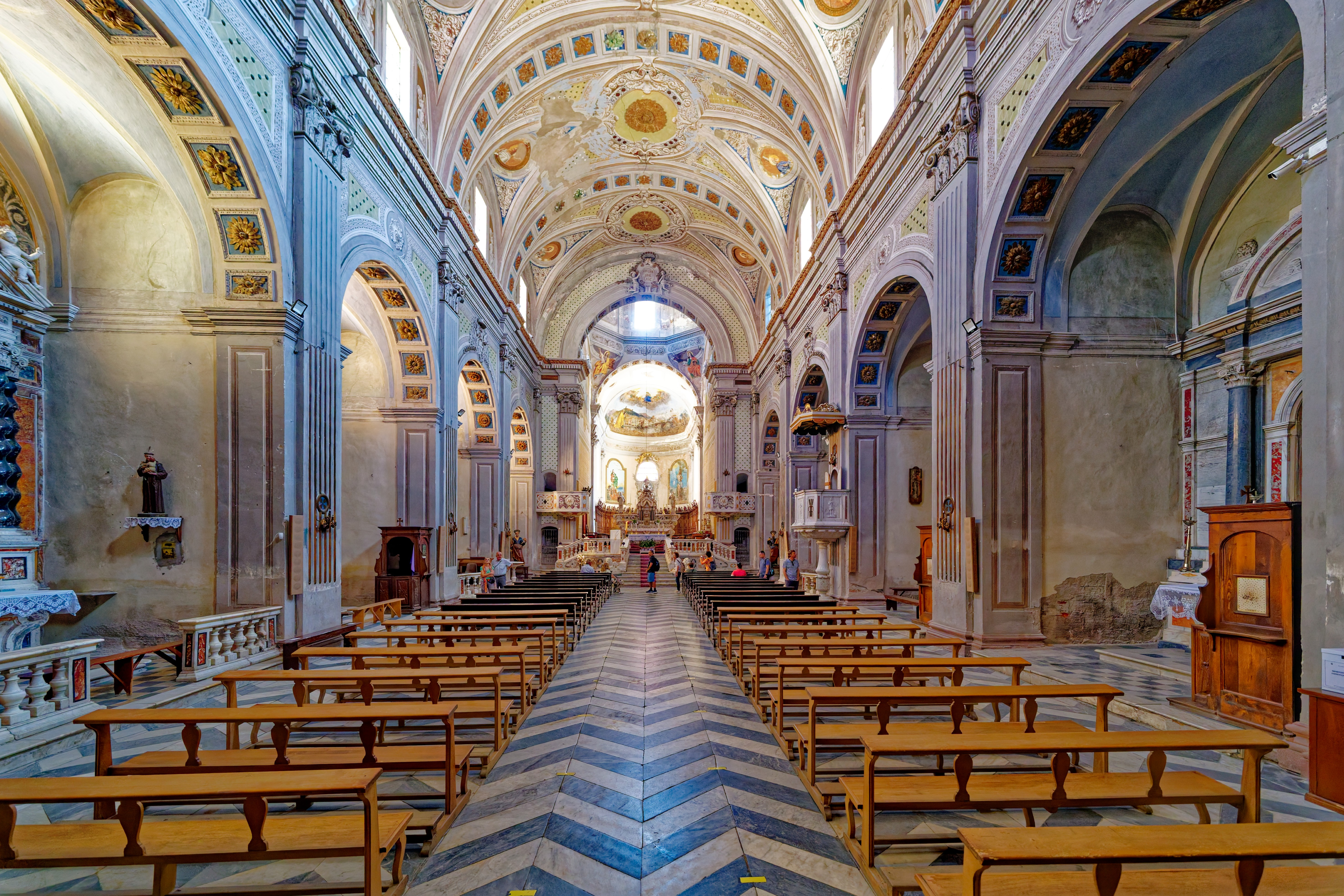
View of the interior

Externally the building is characterized by two cupolas covered in tiles of coloured majolica, and by the squat bell tower in red sandstone, uncompleted, carved with the date 1683. The same stone also characterizes other parts of the building, including the Rococo decorations of the façade with its distinctive lesene (applied stone strips or false pilasters) and cornices.

The interior has a single nave with a barrel-vaulted roof subdivided into five spans by pilasters and arches, with four side-chapels. The first chapel to the right is the great chapel ("cappellone") of the Sacred Heart, very elongated and arranged like a miniature church in itself, mirroring the cathedral in which it is set: the end part contains four little side chapels and a larger chapel under an octagonal cupola.

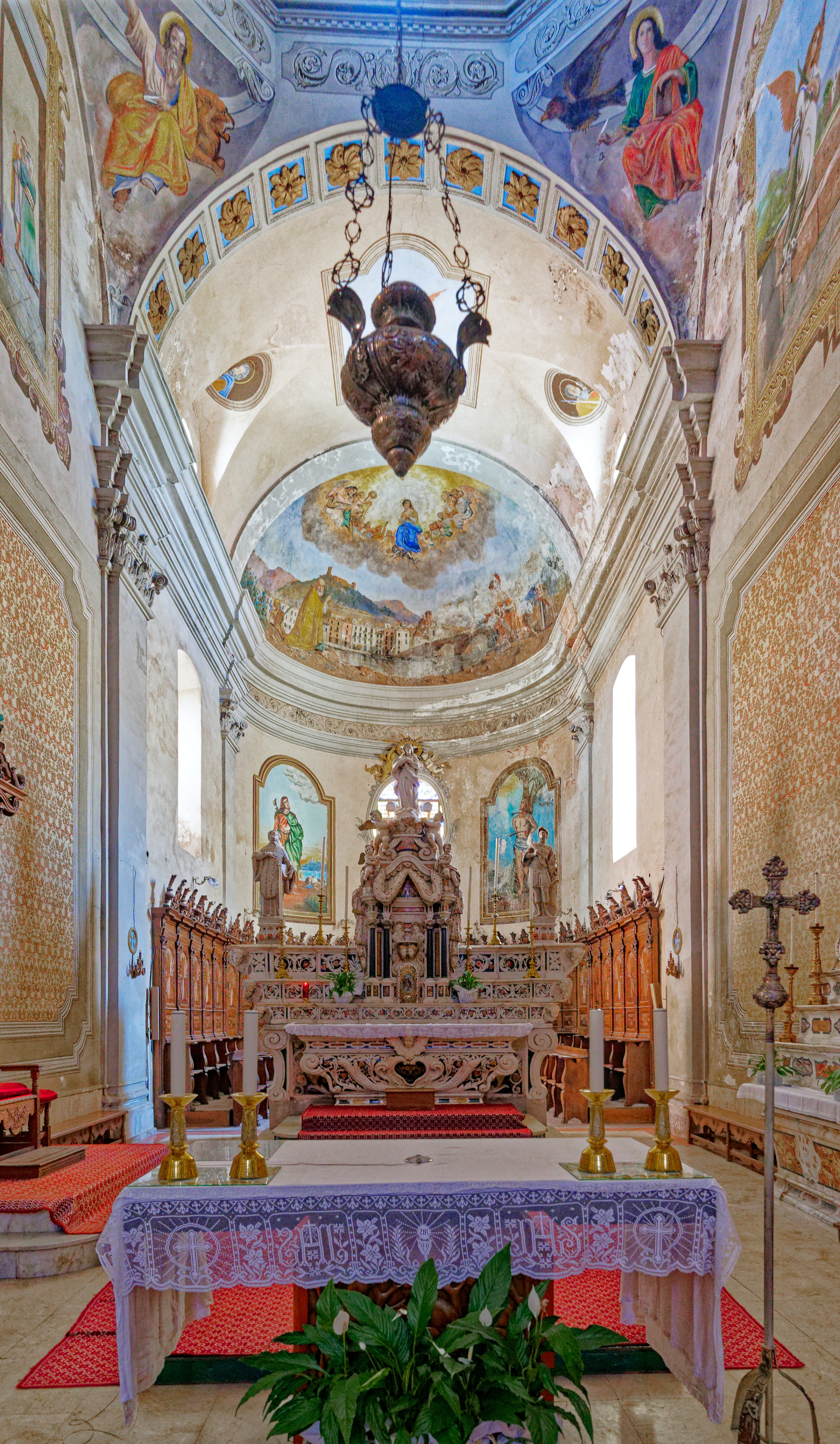
Fresco on the ceiling of the apse by the Parma artist Emilio Scherer (1877-1878)

The archway leading to the presbytery is narrower than the nave and flanked by two pilasters. The presbytery itself, which is very deep, is covered by an octagonal cupola (planned in the opening years of the 19th century by the architect Domenico Franco) and finished by a semi-circular apse, separated from the nave by a marble balustrade. Three steps lead to the presbytery; at the foot of the central stair are two marble lions. The high altar is also of marble of the 17th century, crowned by statues of Our Lady of the Immaculate Conception and of Saints Emilius and Priamus, patrons of the town. To either side of the altar are the inlaid wooden choir stalls. The frescos are by the Parma artist Emilio Scherer, between 1877 and 1878.

== Sources ==
- Naitza, Salvatore, 1992: Architettura dal tardo '600 al classicismo purista. Nuoro: Ilisso ISBN 88-85098-20-7
