= Sassari Cathedral =

Cathedral in Sassari, Italy

Coordinates: 40.7267°N 8.5584°E

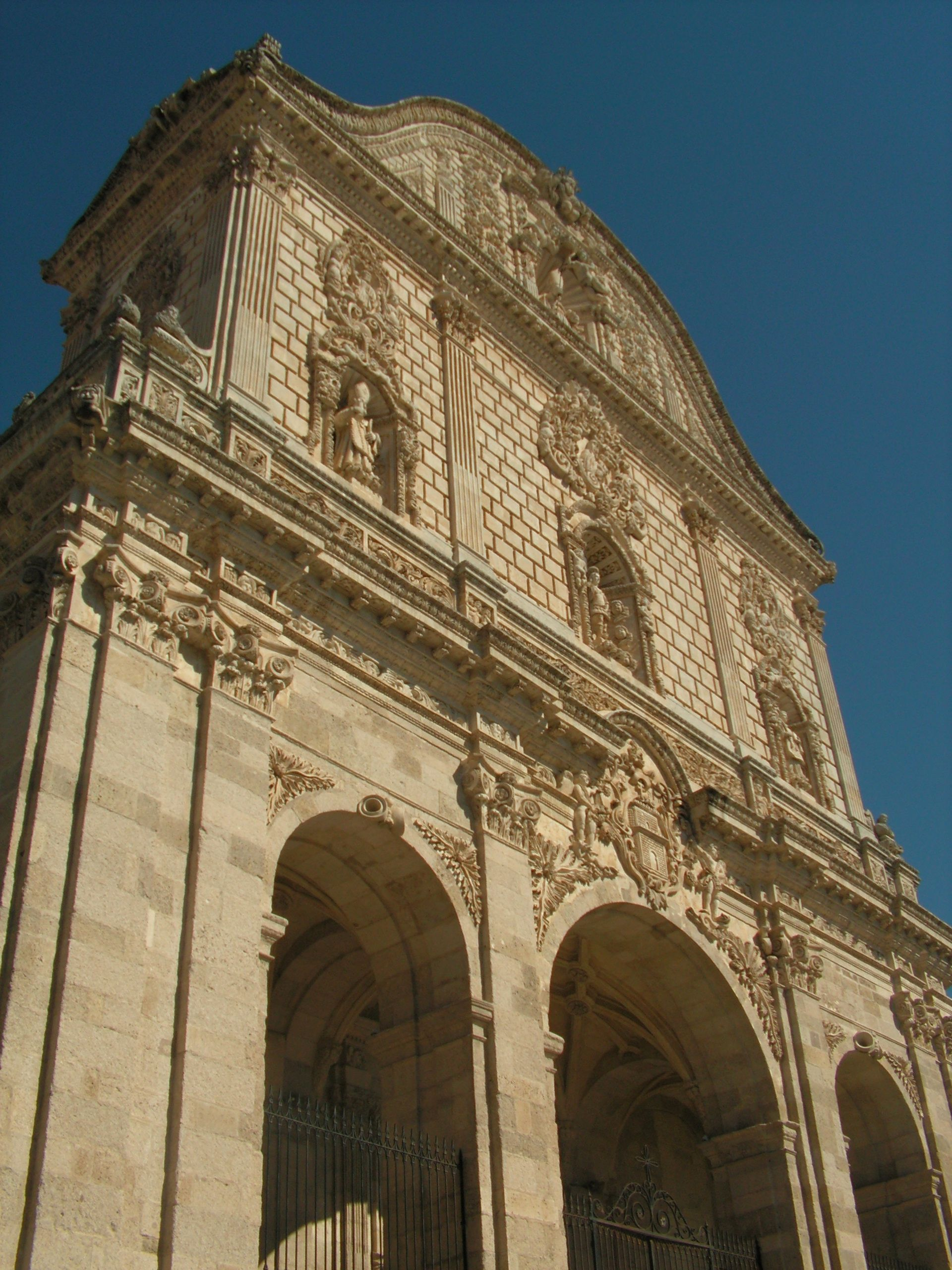
Sassari Cathedral west front

Sassari Cathedral (Italian: Duomo di Sassari; Cattedrale di San Nicola) is the Roman Catholic cathedral of Sassari, Sardinia, Italy, and is dedicated to Saint Nicholas. It is the seat of the Archbishop of Sassari. It was built in the Romanesque style in the 12th century. The present building also includes Gothic, Renaissance, Baroque and Neoclassical elements. Construction was finished in the 18th century.

== See also ==
- 16th-century Western domes

== Sources ==
- Luoghi-Sacra.it: La Cattedrale di San Nicola a Sassari, il Duomo di Sassari in Sardegna (in Italian)

== Bibliography ==
- Roberto Coroneo. Architettura Romanica dalla metà del Mille al primo '300. Nuoro, Ilisso, 1993. ISBN 88-85098-24-X
- Francesca Segni Pulvirenti, Aldo Sari. Architettura tardogotica e d'influsso rinascimentale. Nuoro, Ilisso, 1994. ISBN 88-85098-31-2
- Salvatore Naitza. Architettura dal tardo '600 al classicismo purista. Nuoro, Ilisso, 1992. ISBN 88-85098-20-7
- Maria Grazia Scano. Pittura e scultura dell'Ottocento. Nuoro, Ilisso, 1997. ISBN 88-85098-56-8
