= San Pietro di Sorres =

Coordinates: 40°31′13.2″N 8°44′56.3″E

San Pietro di Sorres is a former cathedral church (Sorres Cathedral), now a Benedictine monastery, in Borutta, a village in the province of Sassari, northern Sardinia, Italy. Built in Pisan Romanesque style during the 12th-13th centuries, it was the seat of the now disappeared diocese of Sorres until 1505. Since 1950 the church and the annexed monastery have housed a community of Benedictine monks.

The church is located at the top of a volcanic hill in the so-called Meilogu region.

== History ==
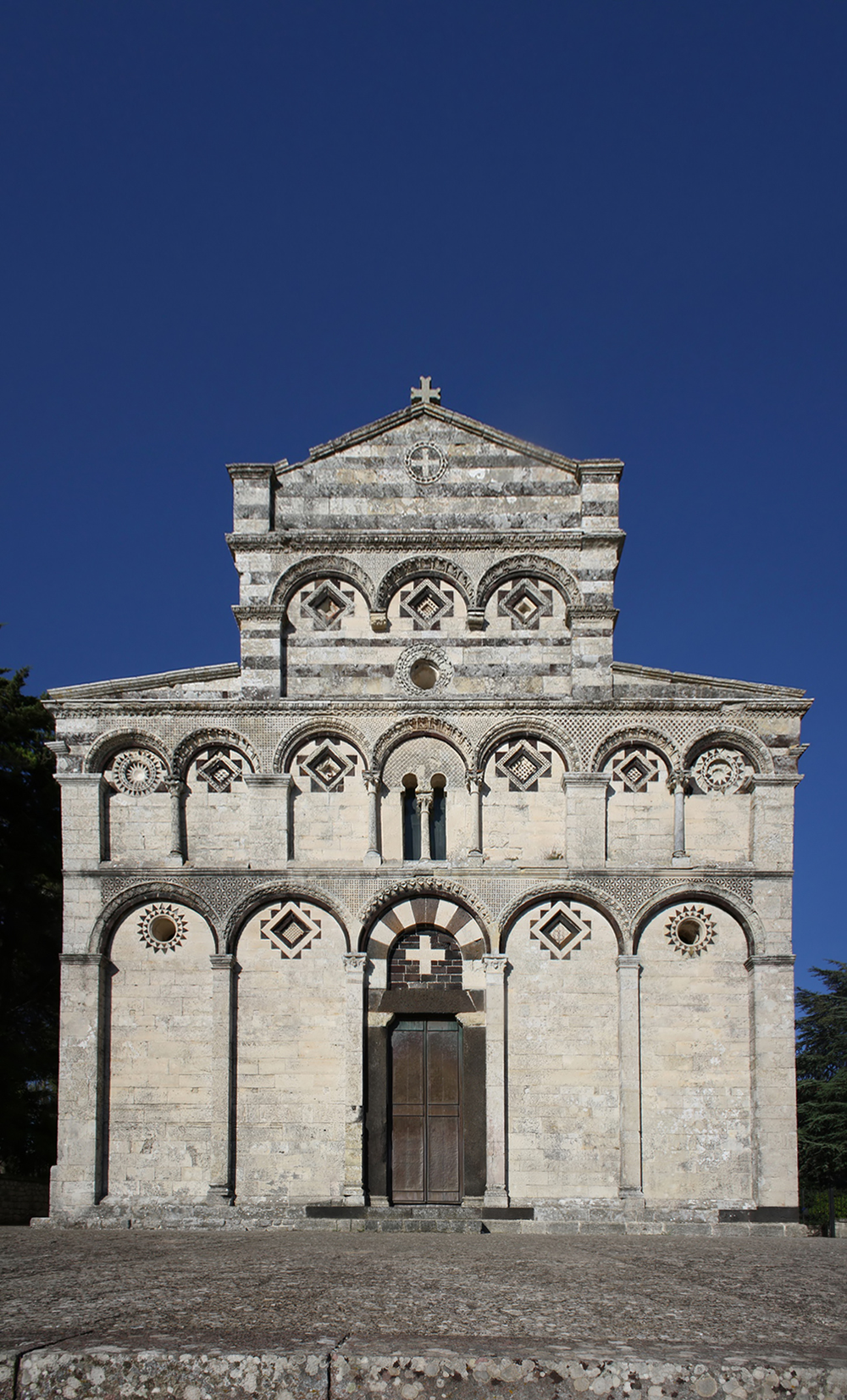
Façade

The site of San Pietro di Sorres has been inhabited since at least Neolithic times; archaeological excavations have proven the presence of the Carthaginians and the Romans also. The few existing documents attest the presence of a settlement known as Sorres here during the 12th century, which was the site of a bishopric. The construction of a cathedral church dedicated to Saint Peter was started in 1171-1178 under bishop Goffredo di Meleduno, and completed in the early 13th century.

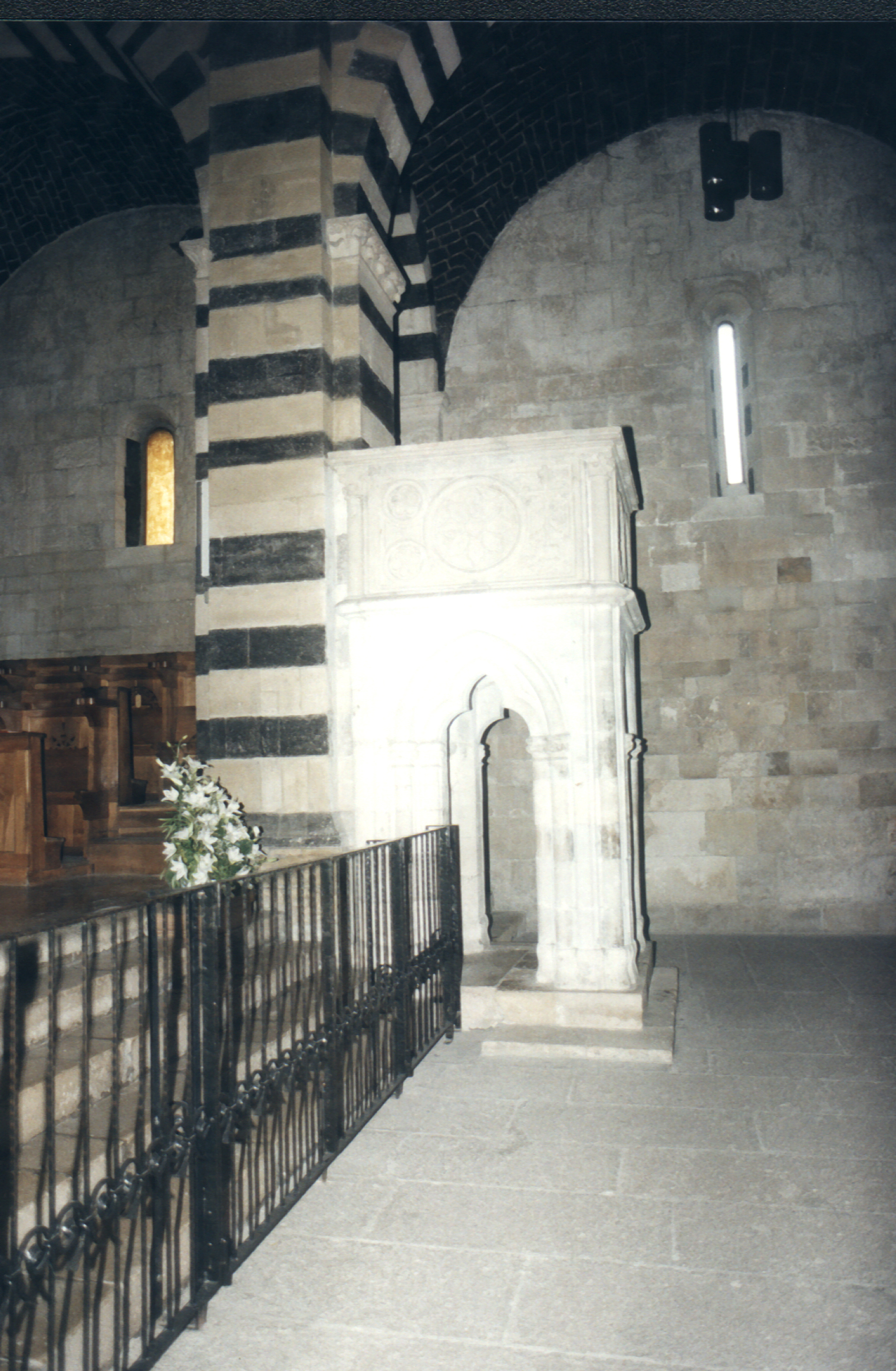
Marble pulpit

Sorres started to decline from the 14th century, after the area fell to the Aragonese. The village was destroyed, with the exception of the cathedral, and the inhabitants were forced to flee to nearby towns, such as Borutta, which became the bishop's residence. The see was abolished in 1505, and was incorporated into the archdiocese of Sassari. The cathedral chapter of San Pietro di Sorres continued to celebrate in the church until all its members died.

Subsequently, the church and its annexed edifices underwent a long period of decay, which was only halted by several restorations in the late 19th century. The church nevertheless remained abandoned until 1947, when it was chosen to house a group of Benedictine monks. New restorations were carried on from 1950 and a neo-Romanesque monastery was built next to it, incorporating the remains of the previous ruined buildings.

The complex received the status of abbey in 1974.

== Description ==
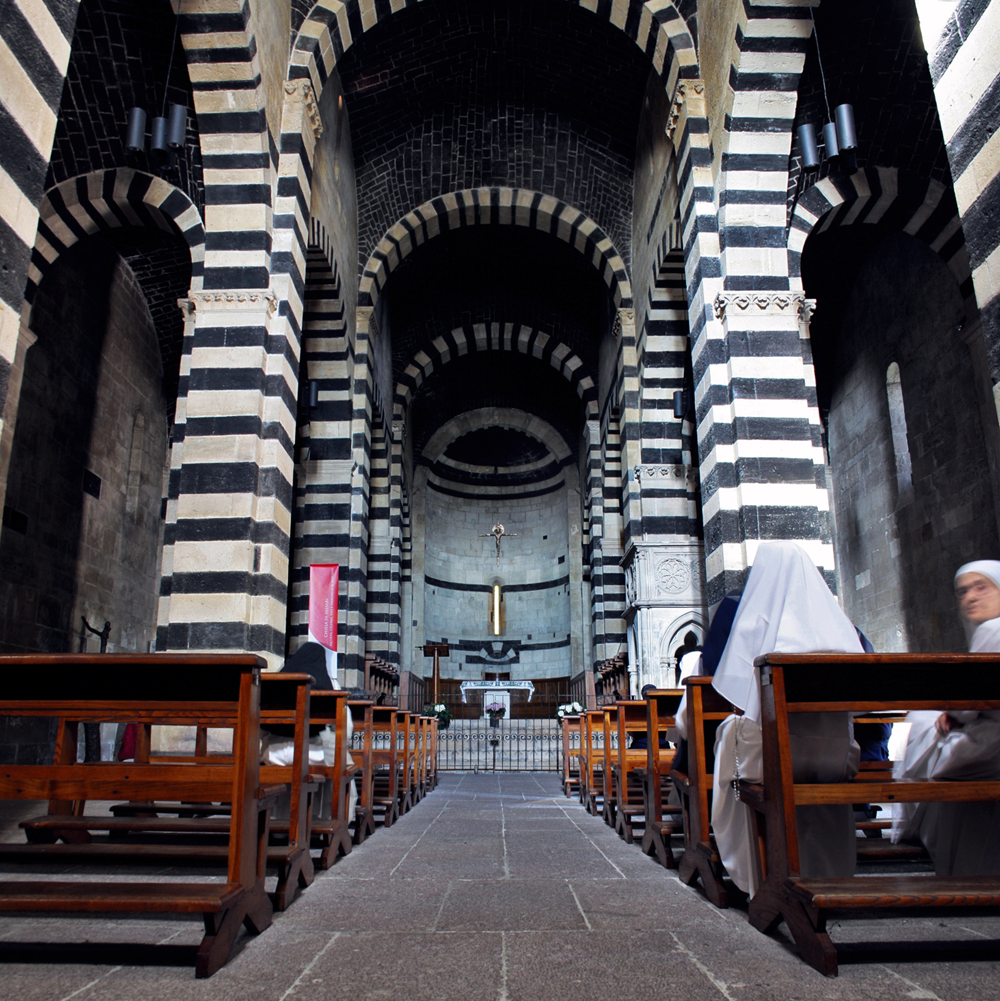
Central nave

The church and the monastery occupy a plateau at the top of a hill, at some 540 meters above sea level, behind a large square. The exterior appearance of the church is characterized by the juxtaposition of black (basalt) and light white (sandstone) stones, as typical of Pisan-Lucchese medieval churches. The façade is divided into four horizontal sectors: the three lower sectors (that of the portal and those above it) feature blind arcades and loggias decorated by rhombi, another typical decoration of contemporary Tuscan religious buildings.

On the first step of the portal is the inscription Mariane maistro, likely the name ("Master Marianus") of the mason who directed the construction. The sides and the apse are decorated with Lombard bands.

The interior contains a nave and two side-aisles divided by eight cruciform piers, characterized by black and white bands, over which are rounded arches. The nave, covered with cross vaults, is illuminated by several mullioned windows; the wall of the west front has a double mullioned window and an oculus. The north aisle houses a 15th-century sculpture of the Madonna and Child, while at the third pier is a marble pulpit in Gothic style, whose dating is uncertain (perhaps the 14th century).

== Sources ==
- Coroneo, Roberto (1993). Architettura Romanica dalla metà del Mille al primo '300. Nuoro: Ilisso. ISBN 88-85098-24-X.
