= José de Jesús María Fajardo =

Most Reverend Jesús María Fajardo
- Bishop of Alghero
- Church: Catholic Church
- Diocese: Diocese of Alghero
- In office: 1693–1694
- Predecessor: Jerónimo Velasco y Mendoza
- Successor: Tommaso Carnicer

Orders
- Consecration: 19 Jul 1693 by Luis Manuel Fernández de Portocarrero-Bocanegra y Moscoso-Osorio

Personal details
- Born: 18 March 1643 Madrid, Spain
- Died: 13 April 1694 (aged 51) Alghero, Italy

José de Jesús María Fajardo, O.A.D. (1643–1694) was a Roman Catholic prelate who served as Bishop of Alghero (1693–1694).

== Biography ==
Jesús María Fajardo was born in Madrid, Spain on 18 Mar 1643 and ordained a priest in the Ordo Augustiniensium Discalceatorum. On 18 May 1693, he was appointed during the papacy of Pope Innocent XII as Bishop of Alghero. On 19 Jul 1693, he was consecrated bishop by Luis Manuel Fernández de Portocarrero-Bocanegra y Moscoso-Osorio, Archbishop of Toledo, with Francisco Zapata Vera y Morales, Titular Bishop of Dara, and Luis de Lemos y Usategui, Bishop Emeritus of Concepción, serving as co-consecrators. He served as Bishop of Alghero until his death on 13 Apr 1694.

Catholic Church titles
Preceded by Jerónimo Velasco y Mendoza	Bishop of Alghero; 1693–1694	Succeeded by Tommaso Carnicer
