= Roman Catholic Diocese of Ploaghe =

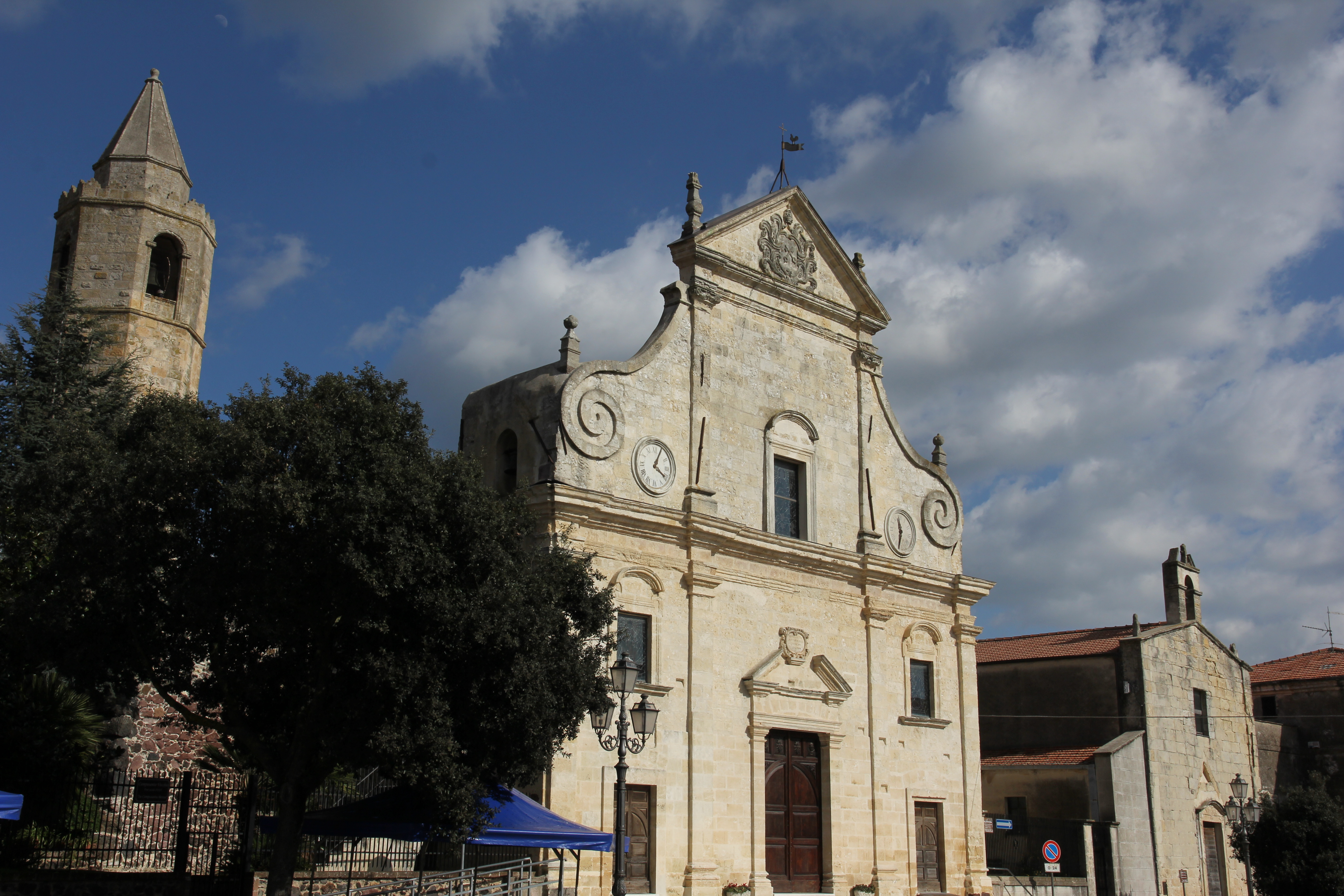
Ploaghe — Chiesa di San Pietro (former cathedral)

The Diocese of Ploaghe (Latin: Dioecesis Plovacensis) was a Roman Catholic diocese located in the town of Ploaghe in the Province of Sassari in the Italian region Sardinia. Established in the 12th century, it was a suffragan (subordinate) of the metropolitan of Torres (Sassari). In 1503, the diocese was suppressed, by order of Pope Julius II.

== History ==
Ploaghe is mentioned as a suffragan of Torres in the Liber Censuum of the late 12th century.

The cathedral in Ploaghe was dedicated to Saint Peter. It was served and administered by a Chapter, composed of an Archpriest and seven canons.

Inside the territory of the former diocese of Ploaghe, there were two monasteries of note. Holy Trinity of Saccargia was in existence before 1112. On 12 December of that year, Archbishop Azzo of Torres issued a privilege for the monastery, which was subscribed by Bishop Petrus of Ploghe. The coenobium of S. Michele de Salvenero was already in existence by 1139 (the centenary of the foundation of the Vallombrosian Benedictines), when Pope Innocent II confirmed the possessions and privileges of S. Michele de Plano and S Michele de Salvenero.

On 8 December 1503, after extensive consultations had taken place between King Ferdinand of Aragon and Sardinia, Isabella I of Castile, and Pope Alexander VI, and after discussions with members of the College of Cardinals (including Cardinal Giuliano della Rovere) and other interested parties, and after additional consultations by Pope Julius II, the diocese of Ploaghe was suppressed, and its territory united to the archdiocese of Torres (Sassari).

== Bishops of Ploaghe ==
Comune of Ploaghe (province_of_Sassari)

- Jorgi di Maiule (1063–1082)

...

- Innocentius (c. 1090)
- Petrus (c. 1116)
- Constantinus Berrica (c. 1125)
- Gualfredus (c. 1139)
- Petrus de Canneto ( ? –1134)
- Constantinus de Lellis (c. 1170)
- Iustus de Salvennor (after 1170)
- Stephanus

...

- [ Ignotus] ( ? – 1203) ]
- Riceto (c. 1215)
- Obertus (c. 1237)
- [ Ignotus (1253) ]

...

- Arlotus (1278–1289)
- Rainerius (1290–1309)
- Comita (c. 1326)
- Petrus (1334– c. 1342)
- Francesco (1342–1352)
- Raimundo (1352–1361)
- Bernardus (1361–1368)
- Andreas (1368–1370)
- Hugo Terrisonis, O.P. (1370–1373)
- Martinus de Narnia (1373– ? )
- Joannes (1386– ? ), Roman Obedience
- Seraphinus, Roman Obedience
- Petrus (1397– ? ), Roman Obedience
- Sanctus de Ferraria, O.P. (1430–1442?)
- Marcus (1443–1447)
- Nicolò Basone (14 Jun 1447 – 1475)
- Basilio Gambone (15 Mar 1476 – 1488)
- Bartolomeo Pathos (27 Aug 1488 – 1495)
- Giovanni Cardona, O.S.A. (13 Feb 1495 – 1503)

Diocese suppressed: 1503

== See also ==
- Archdiocese of Sassari (Torres)
- Catholic Church in Italy

== Sources ==
=== Episcopal lists ===
- Eubel, Conradus, ed. (1913). Hierarchia catholica (in Latin). Vol. 1 (Tomus 1) (second ed.). Münster: Libreria Regensbergiana. p. 403.. Archived.
- Eubel, Conradus, ed. (1914). Hierarchia catholica (in Latin). Vol. 2 (Tomus 2) (second ed.). Münster: Libreria Regensbergiana. p. 217.. Archived.
- Gams, Pius Bonifatius (1873). Series episcoporum Ecclesiae catholicae: quotquot innotuerunt a beato Petro apostolo. Ratisbon: Typis et Sumptibus Georgii Josephi Manz. pp. 841–842. (Use with caution; obsolete)

=== Studies ===
- Cappelletti, Giuseppe (1857). Le chiese d'Italia dalla loro origine sino ai nostri giorni (in Italian). Vol. decimoterzo (13). Venezia: Antonelli. pp. 138–139..
- Martini, Pietro (1841). Storia ecclesiastica di Sardegna. Volume 3 Cagliari: Stamperia Reale, 1841. (pp. 376-377)
- Mattei, Antonio Felice (1758). Sardinia sacra, seu De episcopis Sardis historia nunc primò confecta a F. Antonio Felice Matthaejo. (in Latin). Romae: ex typographia Joannis Zempel apud Montem Jordanum, 1758. Pp. 225-227.

=== External links ===
- Cheney, David M. Catholic-Hierarchy.org. "Diocese of Ploaghe". Retrieved May 1, 2016.
- Chow, Gabriel. GCatholic.org. "Titular Episcopal See of Ploaghe". Retrieved May 1, 2016.
