= Roman Catholic Diocese of Sorres =

Roman Catholic diocese

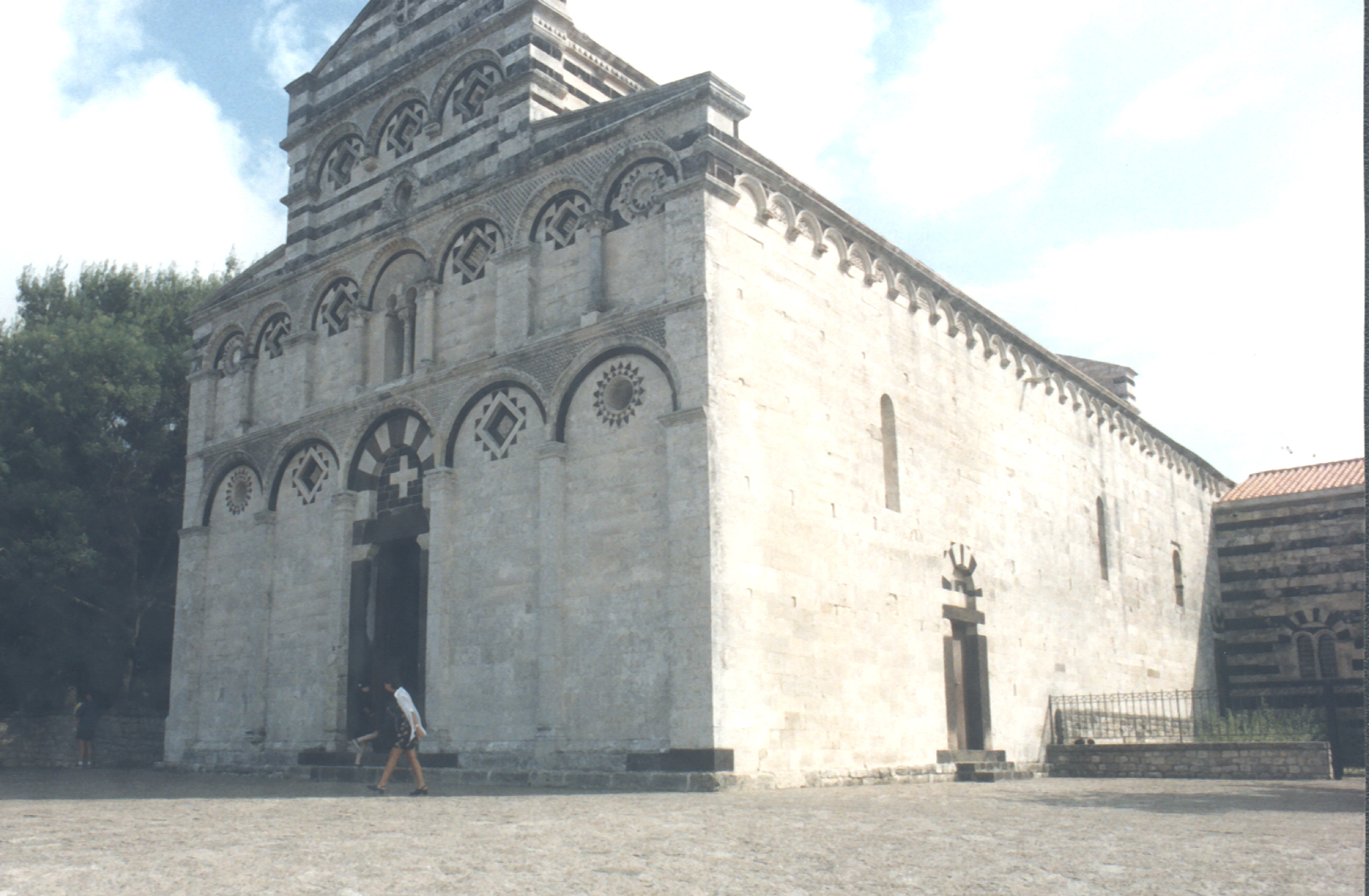
Former cathedral of San Pietro di Sorres

The Diocese of Sorres or Diocese of Sorra (Latin: Dioecesis Sorrensis) was a Roman Catholic diocese located in the village of Borutta in the province of Sassari, northern Sardinia, Italy. Established by the 12th century, the diocese was suppressed by Pope Julius II in 1503, and its territory incorporated in the Archdiocese of Sassari. The name "Sorres", though not the diocese itself, was revived in 1976 as a titular bishopric.

== History ==
=== Chapter and cathedral ===
The diocese's cathedral was San Pietro di Sorres. The date of its foundation, and the number of reconstructions, are controversial, but an inscription found in 1966 indicates that the current edifice was completed in 1221, by Master Mariane. The usual residence of the Bishops of Sorres was in the village of Borutta, a distance of two miles from Sorres. The bishops frequently celebrated pontifically and held Chapter meetings in the church of St. Mary Magdalen in Borutta.

The corporation caLLed the cathedral Chapter, consisting of the Archpriest and ten canons, was responsible for staffing and administration of the cathedral and conducting its services. It is recorded, in the 15th century, that the canons lived together as a community.

In 1428, Bishop Nicolas Vidini presided over a meeting of the cathedral Chapter, at which it was decided that, when a vacancy in the bishopric occurred, the Vicar Capitular, who oversaw the affairs of the diocese, would always be the Archpriest.

In 1445, the bishop of Sorres acquired the abandoned monasteries of S. Maria di Sali, S. Antonio di Monte Cartili, and S. Carrato.

In 1463, Bishop Giacomo de Podio (1461-1497) attended the provincial synod of Torres.

The diocese of Sorres used the word "synod" in two senses: an assembly of the bishop and Chapter and a few interested parties, held thrice-yearly, at Quadragesima (Lent, first Sunday), in the week after Easter, and at Pentecost; a more inclusive meeting, the general synod ("sinodu mazore"), held on 22 February, the feast of S. Pietro, to whom the cathedral was dedicated. A major synod was held on 22 February 1473.

=== Suppression ===
In the second half of the 15th century, several dioceses on the island of Sardinia were in difficulties due to financial shortages, as well as the movements of peoples. After extensive consultations had taken place between King Ferdinand of Aragon and Sardinia, Isabella I of Castile, and Pope Alexander VI, and after discussions with members of the College of Cardinals (including Cardinal Giuliano della Rovere) and other interested parties, plans were advanced to consolidate the troubled dioceses. Alexander VI died, however, before the decisions were announced or implemented. After additional consultations, Pope Julius II, on 8 December 1503, in the bull "Aequum Reputamus," suppressed the diocese of Sorres, and its territory was united to the archdiocese of Torres (Sassari).

==== Titular bishopric ====
On 30 November 1968, the title of "Bishop of Sorres", though not the diocese itself or its territory, was revived, and Bishop Lorenzo Bianchi was appointed. Bianchi had been Bishop of Hong Kong (1951–1968).

- Lorenzo Bianchi (1968–1976)
- Franz Joseph Kuhnle (1976–2021)
- Carlo Villano (2021–2023)

== Bishops of Sorres ==
...

- Jacobus (1112)
- Albertus (c. 1113)

...

- Ioannes (c. 1133–1159)
- Joannes Sarga (c. 1170)
- Goffredo, O.Cist. (c. 1171–1178)
- Augerius, O.Cist. (c. 1188–1200)
- Petrus, O.Cist. (c. 1205–1211)
- Ioannes ( ? –1309?)
- Gregorius, O.E.S.A. (1322–1323)
- Antonius, O.F.M. (1323–1332?)
- Bernardus (1332–1333)
- Barosonus (1333–1342?)
- Giovanni (1342–1344)
- Benedictus (1344–1348)
- Francesco (1348)
- Petrus de Garsinis, O.P.
- Arnaldus, O.P. (1348– )
- Francesco (1365– )
- Nicolaus, Avignon Obedience
- Berengarius (1386– ), Avignon Obedience
- Gonnarius (1382– ? ), Roman Obedience?
- Benedictus, Roman Obedience?
- Francicus, Roman Obedience?
- Andreas, Roman Obedience?
- Jacobus (1386–1391?)
- Giovanni de Martis (1391–1400?) Roman Obedience
- Nicolaus (1400– ? ) Roman Obedience
- Petrus (1414–1422?)
- Nicolas Vidini (1422–1428)
- Stephanus, O.Cist. (1428–1440)
- Giovanni Sancii, O.P. (1440–1452)
- Thomas (1452–1461?)
- Giacomo de Podio (1461-1497 Died)
- Giacomo di Puiasolla, O.E.S.A. (1497–1503)

== See also ==
- Archdiocese of Sassari (Torres)

== Sources ==
=== Episcopal lists ===
- Eubel, Conradus, ed. (1913). Hierarchia catholica (in Latin). Vol. 1 (Tomus 1) (second ed.). Münster: Libreria Regensbergiana. pp. 458–459.. Archived.
- Eubel, Conradus, ed. (1914). Hierarchia catholica (in Latin). Vol. 2 (Tomus 2) (second ed.). Münster: Libreria Regensbergiana. p. 240.. Archived.

=== Studies ===
- Cappelletti, Giuseppe (1857). Le chiese d'Italia dalla loro origine sino ai nostri giorni (in Italian). Vol. decimoterzo (13). Venezia: Antonelli. pp. 134–137..
- Martini, Pietro (1841). Storia ecclesiastica di Sardegna. Volume 3 Cagliari: Stamperia Reale, 1841. (pp. 373-376)
- Mattei, Antonio Felice (1758). Sardinia sacra, seu De episcopis Sardis historia nunc primò confecta a F. Antonio Felice Matthaejo. (in Latin). Romae: ex typographia Joannis Zempel apud Montem Jordanum, 1758. Pp. 228-230.
- Spano, Giuseppe (1858). Nbtizie storico-critiche intorno all'antico episcopato di Sorres ricavate da un autografo manoscritto del sec. XV. Cagliari 1858.

==== External links ====
- Chow, Gabriel, GCatholic.org, "Titular Episcopal See of Sorres"; retrieved 25 August 2016..
