= Giacomo Lanzetti =

Italian Roman Catholic bishop (1942–2026)

His Excellency, The Most Reverend Giacomo Lanzetti
- Bishop Emeritus of Alba
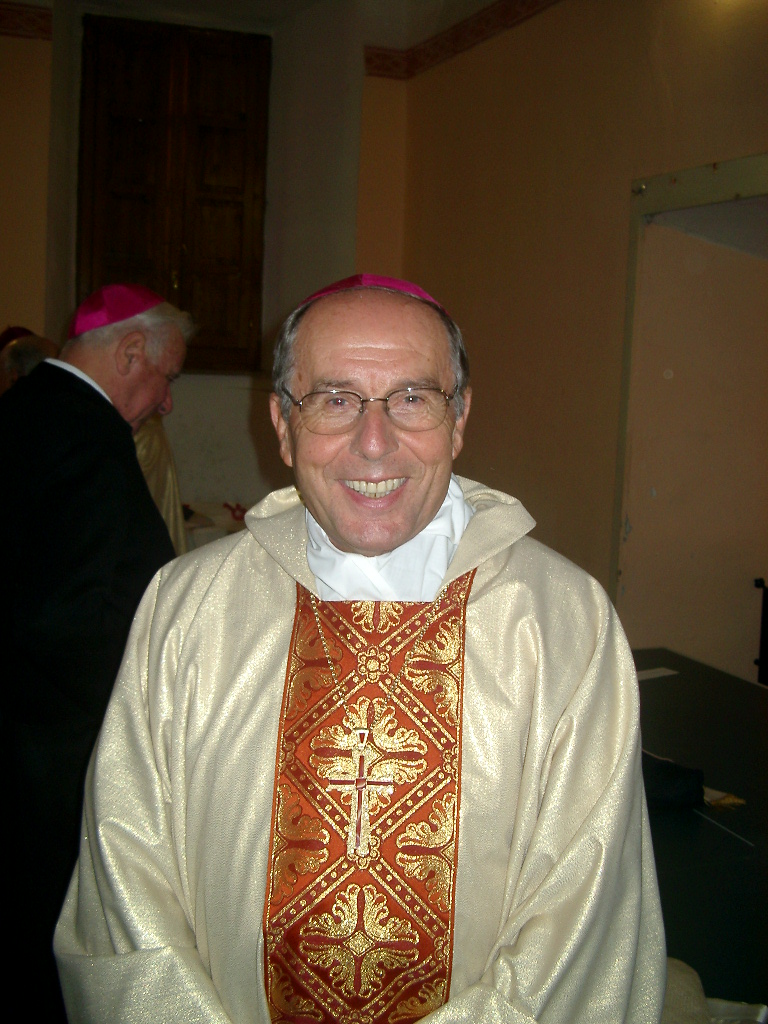
- Church: Catholic Church
- Archdiocese: Turin
- Diocese: Alba
- Appointed: 28 June 2010
- Term ended: 24 September 2015
- Predecessor: Sebastiano Dho
- Successor: Marco Brunetti
- Other posts: Titular Bishop of Mariana in Corsica (2002–2006); Auxiliary Bishop of Turin (2002–2006); Bishop of Alghero-Bosa (2006–2010)

Orders
- Ordination: 26 June 1966 by Michele Pellegrino
- Consecration: 20 July 2002 by Severino Poletto, Paolo Romeo and Pier Giorgio Micchiardi

Personal details
- Born: 21 April 1942 Carmagnola, Piedmont, Kingdom of Italy
- Died: 2 July 2026 (aged 84) Turin, Piedmont, Italy
- Education: Pontifical Salesian University
- Motto: Sincero corde servire
- Coat of arms

Styles of Giacomo Lanzetti
- Reference style: His Excellency; The Most Reverend
- Spoken style: Your Excellency
- Religious style: Bishop

Giacomo Lanzetti (21 April 1942 – 2 July 2026) was an Italian Roman Catholic prelate who served as Bishop of Alba from 2010 until his retirement in 2015. He previously served as Auxiliary Bishop of the Archdiocese of Turin (2002–2006) and Bishop of Alghero-Bosa (2006–2010).

== Early life and priesthood ==
Lanzetti was born on 21 April 1942 in Carmagnola, Piedmont, in the Archdiocese of Turin. He studied at the diocesan seminaries of Giaveno and Rivoli before completing theological formation in Turin. He was later sent to Rome, where he obtained a diploma in catechetical pedagogy at the Pontifical Salesian University.

He was ordained a priest for the Archdiocese of Turin on 26 June 1966. He served as assistant priest, and later parish priest of San Benedetto Abate in Turin. He was active in diocesan pastoral structures, serving as assistant in Catholic Action, and held membership in the Presbyteral Council and College of Consultors.

In 2000, he was appointed Episcopal Vicar for the city district of Turin, and in 2001 he became Vicar general of the Archdiocese of Turin.

== Episcopal ministry ==
On 21 June 2002, Pope John Paul II appointed Lanzetti Auxiliary Bishop of Turin and Titular Bishop of Mariana in Corsica. He received episcopal consecration on 20 July 2002 from Cardinal Severino Poletto, with co-consecrators Archbishop Paolo Romeo and Bishop Pier Giorgio Micchiardi.

On 29 September 2006, Pope Benedict XVI appointed him Bishop of Alghero-Bosa following the resignation of Antonio Vacca. He took canonical possession of the diocese later that year.

On 28 June 2010, Pope Benedict XVI transferred him to the Diocese of Alba following the resignation of Sebastiano Dho. As bishop of Alba, he carried out pastoral governance, diocesan visits, and implementation of pastoral planning.

In July 2015, he submitted his resignation to Pope Francis for health reasons. Pope Francis accepted the resignation on 24 September 2015 and appointed Marco Brunetti as his successor. Lanzetti then became Bishop Emeritus of Alba.

== Death ==
Lanzetti died at the Cottolengo Hospital in Turin on 2 July 2026, at the age of 84. His funeral Mass was celebrated at the Alba Cathedral on 4 July.

Catholic Church titles
Preceded by Sebastiano Dho	Bishop of Alba; 2010–2015	Succeeded by Marco Brunetti
Preceded by Antonio Vacca	Bishop of Alghero-Bosa; 2006–2010	Succeeded by Mauro Maria Morfino
Preceded by Position established	Titular Bishop of Mariana in Corsica; 2002–2006	Succeeded by Paolo De Nicolò
Preceded by —	Auxiliary Bishop of Turin; 2002–2006	Succeeded by —
