= Sergio Pintor =

Italian Roman Catholic bishop (1937–2020)

Sergio Giovanni Pintor
- Bishop of Ozieri
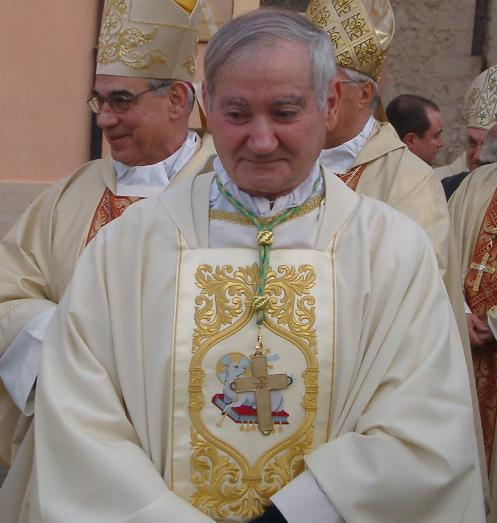
- Mons. Pintor on the day of his episcopal ordination, 8 December 2006
- Church: Catholic Church
- Diocese: Diocese of Ozieri
- In office: 29 September 2006 – 10 December 2012
- Predecessor: Sebastiano Sanguinetti
- Successor: Corrado Melis

Orders
- Ordination: 9 July 1961 by Sebastiano Fraghì
- Consecration: 8 December 2006 by Paolo Romeo

Personal details
- Born: 16 November 1937 Oristano, Province of Cagliari, Kingdom of Italy
- Died: 26 December 2020 (aged 83) Oristano, Sardinia, Italy

Sergio Pintor (16 November 1937 – 26 December 2020) was an Italian Roman Catholic prelate, who served as a Diocesan Bishop of the Roman Catholic Diocese of Ozieri. Msgr Pintor had previously served as director of the CEI's office for the pastoral outreach in health care, during the presidency of Cardinal Ruini.

After attending the gymnasium at the seminar of the Archbishop of Oristano and the high school and theology at the Regional Seminar of Cuglieri, on 9 July 1961 he was ordained a priest for the Diocese of Oristano. In 1969, he graduated in Pastoral Theology from the Pontifical Lateran University in Rome.

In the diocese he was assistant pastor of the Cathedral of Oristano (his parish of origin) and diocesan assistant of young men of Catholic Action, and subsequently he served as spiritual director of the seminary Archbishop of Oristano.

From 1970 to 1995 he collaborated with the National Catechetical Office of the CEI for the preparation of new catechisms and for the formation of catechists. On 24 September 1985 he was appointed an honorary prelate of His Holiness.

This has been as a consultant to the Pontifical Council for Pastoral Assistance to Health Care Workers.

On 29 September 2006, just before his 69th birthday, Pintor was appointed bishop of the Diocese of Ozieri. Some have noted that is unusually old to receive an episcopal assignment.

On 8 December of the same year he received the episcopal consecration by the then apostolic nuncio in Italy Paolo Romeo. In November 2012, Bishop Pintor submitted his resignation to Pope Benedict XVI, via the Congregation for Bishops, having reached 75. His resignation was accepted on 10 December 2012.
