= Diocese of Alghero-Bosa =

Roman Catholic diocese in Italy

Coordinates: 40.5500°N 8.3167°E

Diocese of Alghero-Bosa Dioecesis Algarensis-Bosanensis

Catholic
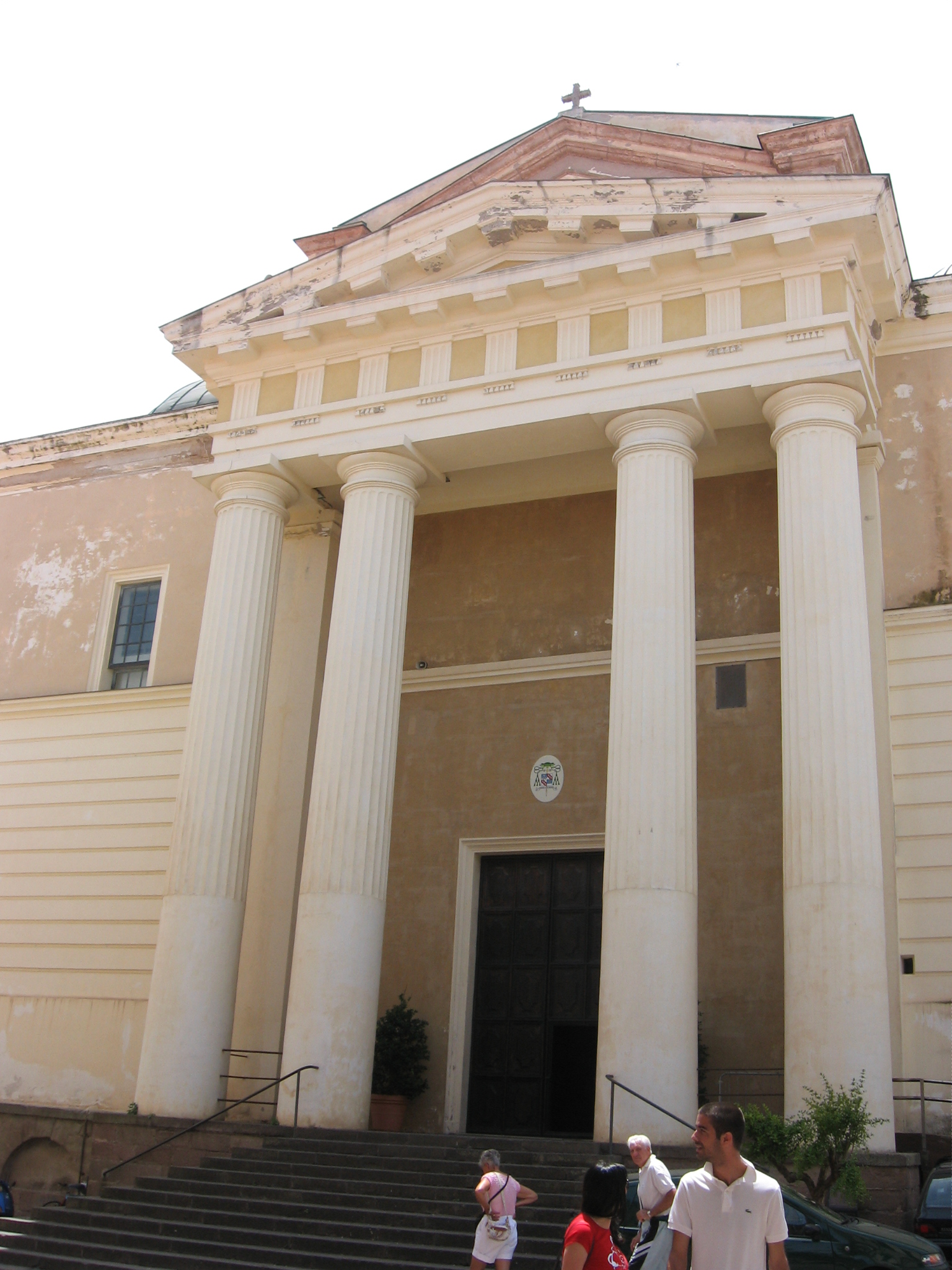
- Alghero Cathedral

Location
- Country: Italy
- Ecclesiastical province: Sassari

Statistics
- Area: 2,012 km^{2} (777 sq mi)
- Population: Total; Catholics: (as of 2022); 103,153 ▼; 102,195 ▼ (99.1%)
- Parishes: 61

Information
- Denomination: Catholic Church
- Rite: Roman Rite
- Established: 8 December 1503
- Cathedral: Alghero Cathedral (Cattedrale di Santa Maria Immaculata)
- Co-cathedral: Bosa Cathedral (Concattedrale dell'Immacolato Concezione)
- Secular priests: 50 (diocesan) ▼12 (Religious Orders) ▼10 Permanent Deacons ▼

Current leadership
- Pope: Leo XIV
- Bishop: Mauro Maria Morfino

Website
- www.diocesialghero-bosa.it

The Diocese of Alghero-Bosa (Latin: Dioecesis Algarensis-Bosanensis) is a Latin Church diocese of the Catholic Church. It is a suffragan of the Metropolitan Archdiocese of Sassari, on Sardinia, insular Italy.

The bishops' seat is Alghero Cathedral. Bosa Cathedral is a co-cathedral of the diocese.

== History ==
The town of Alghero was begun by the Doria of Genoa in 1102. In 1106 John, Bishop of Ottana (Othanensis), assisted at the consecration of the Church of the Trinity in Saccargia.

After a long period, the see was renewed and confirmed by Pope Julius II in his papal bull "Aequum Reputamus" of 8 December 1503, splitting its territory off from the Metropolitan Archdiocese of Sassari, from the suppressed Roman Catholic Diocese of Bisarcio, Diocese of Castro and Diocese of Ottana. The seat of the bishops of Alghero was to be in Alghero, in the church of the Immaculate Conception, raised to the status of a cathedral. It was granted a Chapter, consisting of three dignities (the Archpriest, the Archdeacon, and the Dean) and thirteen (later fourteen, then sixteen) canons.

Bishop Pedro del Frago Garcés (1566–1572) had the cathedral pulled down, in order to replace it with a more commodious building. Funds ran out, however, and it was not until 1589 that Bishop Baccallar took up the building project again.

Pietro Parens, a Genoese, became bishop on 18 December 1503; he was present at the Fifth Lateran Council in 1512.

On 2 April 1549, Bishop Pietro Viguer and the Chapter of the cathedral met and agreed on a set of statutes for the Chapter, which the bishop then published.

In 1582–1583, the plague struck Alghero, with a major loss of life. Dozens of bodies have been discovered in what became the courtyard of the Jesuit college of San Michele in Alghero. The college was founded officially on 11 November 1589.

Bishop Andrés Baccallar (1578–1604) conducted an ad limina visit to Rome in 1590. His report to the Sacred Congregation of the Council survives, and provides detailed information about the state of the diocese of Alghero. He reported that he had founded (and subsidized) a seminary. In 1589, he also purchased a house suitable to be an episcopal residence. ALghero had never had an episcopal palace, and the bishops resided elsewhere.

On 24 May 1727, Pope Benedict XIII granted the king of Sardinia (duke of Savoy), Victor Amadeus II, the privilege of nominating candidates to vacant bishoprics on the island of Sardinia. The privilege was extended to his successors by Pope Pius VI in the bull "Pastoris Officii" of 29 March 1779.

=== Synods ===
Bishop Pedro del Frago Garcés (1566–1572) held a diocesan synod on 21–28 May 1572. Bishop Andrés Bacallar (1578–1604) held a diocesan synod from 9 November to 22 December 1581, and again in 1586. Bishop Giovanni Battista Lomellini (1726–1729) Held a diocesan synod in 1728. Bishop Gioacchino Radicati held a diocesan synod on 5–7 December 1785.

On 21 July 1779, the diocese of Alghero lost territory to establish the Diocese of Galtelli-Nuoro. On 24 September 1798, it gained territory from the Archdiocese of Sassari. On 9 March 1803 it gained territory from the Diocese of Bosa, and lost territory to establish the Diocese of Bisarcio. On 31 December 1938 it lost territory to the Diocese of Nuoro.

On 9 September 1919, the collegiate church of Santa Maria ad Nives in the town of Cuglieri (22km,14mi south of Bosa) was granted the title and privileges of a "minor basilica" by Pope Benedict XV.

The Sanctuary of Our Lady of Valverde near Alghero is also notable.

=== Suppression of diocese of Bosa ===
On 30 September 1986, with the consent of Pope John Paul II, the Congregation of Bishops issued a decree, suppressing the diocese of Bosa and uniting it to Alghero. The name of the diocese would be Algarensis-Bosanensis. The seat of the new diocese and its cathedral would be in Alghero; the cathedral in Bosa would become a "co-cathedral". The territory of the diocese would be the territory of both dioceses. Bishop Giovanni Pes would be the bishop, and was made responsible for implemting the decree.

== Bishops ==
=== Bishops of Alghero ===
==== From 1503 to 1642 ====
- Pedro Parente (1503–1514)
- Juan Loaysa (1514–1524)
- Guillermo Casador (1525–1527)
- [Francesco Solis (1527–1528)] Bishop-elect
- Domenico Pastorello, O.F.M. (1528–1534)
- Juan Reina (1534–1538)
- Durante Duranti (1538–1541)
- Pedro Vaguer (1541–1566)
- Pedro del Frago Garcés (1566–1572)
- Antioco Nin (1572–1578)
- Andrés Bacallar (1578–1604)
- Nicolò Canavera (1605–1611)
- Gavino Manca de Cedrelles (1612–1613)
- Lorenzo Nieto y Corrales Montero Nieto, O.S.B. (1613–1621)
- Ambrogio Machin, O.Merc. (1621–1627)
- Gaspar Prieto Orduña (1627–1636)
- Cipriano de Azcón (1637–1639)
- Antonio Nusco (1639–1644?)

==== From 1644 to 1793 ====
- Vicente Agustín Clavería, O.Merc. (1644–1652)
- Francesco Boyl, O.Merc. (1653–1655)
- Dionigi Carta-Senes, O.F.M.Obs. (1657–1658)
- Salvatore Mulas Pirella (1659–1661)
- Andrés Aznar Naves, O.E.S.A. (1663–1671)
- Lussorio Rogger (Roger) (1672–1676)
- Francisco López de Urraca (1677–1681)
- Luis Diaz de Aux de Armendáriz, O.Merc. (1681–1686)
- Jerónimo Velasco, O.S.B. (1686–1692)
- José de Jesús María Fajardo, O.E.S.A. (1693–1694)
- Tommaso Carnicer, O.P. (1695–1720
- Giovanni Battista Lomellini, O.P. (1726–1729)
- Dionigi Gioacchino Belmont, O.S.M. (1729–1732)
- Matteo Bertolini (1733–1741)
- Carlo Francesco Casanova (1741–1751)
- Giuseppe Agostino Delbecchi (1751–1763)
- Giuseppe Maria Incisa Beccaria, C.Cl.S.P. (1764–1772)
- Gioacchino Michele Radicati, O.P. (1772–1793)

==== From 1800 to present ====
- [ Salvator Giuseppe Mammeli ], Bishop-elect
- Pietro Bianco (confirmed 23 Sep 1805 – died 28 May 1827)
- Filippo Arrica (confirmed 24 Feb 1832 – died 29 Jan 1839)
- [ Efisio Casula (1842) ] Bishop-elect
- Pietro-Raffaele Arduini (confirmed 30 Jan 1843 – died 12 Nov 1863)
- Giovanni Maria Filia (appointed 24 Nov 1871 – died 22 Oct 1882)
- Eliseo Giordano (appointed 15 Mar 1883 – died 7 Jan 1906)
- Giovanni Battista Vinati (appointed 16 Jan 1906 – resigned May 1907)
- Ernesto Maria Piovella (appointed 15 Apr 1907 – 15 Apr 1914: appointed Archbishop of Oristano)
- Francesco d’Errico (appointed 8 Sep 1914 – resigned 8 Oct 1938)

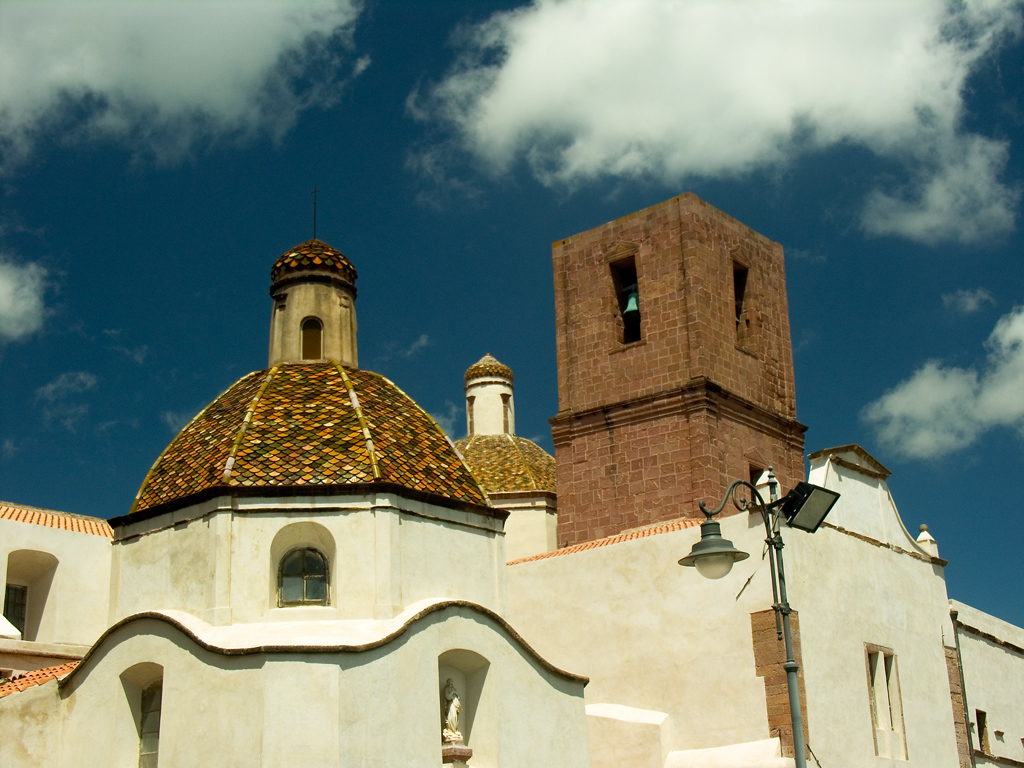
Bosa Cathedral

- Adolfo Ciuchini, O.Merc. (1939–1967)
- Francesco Spanedda (appointed 18 Mar 1972 – 17 Mar 1979: appointed Archbishop of Oristano)
- Giovanni Pes (1979–1993)

=== Bishops of Alghero-Bosa ===
- Antonio Vacca (1993–2006)
- Giacomo Lanzetti (2006–2010)
- Mauro Maria Morfino, S.D.B. (appointed 31 Jan 2011 – )

== See also ==
- Diocese of Bosa

== Sources ==
=== Reference Works ===
- Gams, Pius Bonifatius (1873). Series episcoporum Ecclesiae catholicae: quotquot innotuerunt a beato Petro apostolo. Ratisbon: Typis et Sumptibus Georgii Josephi Manz. p. 832. (Use with caution; obsolete)
- Eubel, Conradus, ed. (1923). Hierarchia catholica (in Latin). Vol. 3 (Tomus 3) (second ed.). Münster: Libreria Regensbergiana. p. 104.. Archived.
- Gauchat, Patritius (Patrice) (1935). Hierarchia catholica (in Latin). Vol. IV (1592-1667). Münster: Libraria Regensbergiana.
- Ritzler, Remigius; Sefrin, Pirminus (1952). Hierarchia catholica medii et recentis aevi (in Latin). Vol. V (1667-1730). Patavii: Messagero di S. Antonio.
- Ritzler, Remigius; Sefrin, Pirminus (1958). Hierarchia catholica medii et recentis aevi (in Latin). Vol. 6 (1730-1799). Patavii: Messagero di S. Antonio.
- Ritzler, Remigius; Sefrin, Pirminus (1968). Hierarchia Catholica medii et recentioris aevi (in Latin). Vol. 7 (1800–1846). Monasterii: Libr. Regensburgiana.
- Ritzler, Remigius; Sefrin, Pirminus (1978). Hierarchia catholica Medii et recentioris aevi (in Latin). Vol. 8 (1846–1903). Il Messaggero di S. Antonio.
- Pięta, Zenon (2002). Hierarchia catholica medii et recentioris aevi (in Latin). Vol. 9 (1903–1922). Padua: Messagero di San Antonio. ISBN 978-88-250-1000-8.

=== Studies ===
- Cappelletti, Giuseppe (1857). Le chiese d'Italia dalla loro origine sino ai nostri giorni (in Italian). Vol. decimoterzo (13). Venezia: Antonelli. pp. 147–153..
- Fara, Giovanni Francesco (1835). De chorographia Sardiniae: libri duo de rebus Sardois libri quatuor edente Aloisio Cibrario. (in Latin). Turin: Typographia Regia, 1835.
- Martini, Pietro (1841). Storia ecclesiastica di Sardegna. Volume 3 Cagliari: Stamperia Reale, 1841. (pp. 336-340)
- Mattei, Antonio Felice (1758). Sardinia sacra, seu De episcopis Sardis historia nunc primò confecta a F. Antonio Felice Matthaejo. (in Latin). Romae: ex typographia Joannis Zempel apud Montem Jordanum, 1758. Pp. 171-180.
- Monti, Alessandro Augusto (1915). La Compagnia di Gesù nel territorio della Provincia Torinese. (in Italian) Vol. 2. Chieri: M. Ghirardi 1915.
- Nughes, Antoni (1991). El sínode del Bisbe Baccallar: l'Alguer, església i societat al segle XVI, (in Spanish), (Barcelona: Institut d'estudes catalans 1991).
- Pintus, Sebastiano (1909). "Vescovi di Uttana e Alghero," (in Italian), in: Archivio Storico Sardo Vol. V (1909), pp. 97- .

=== External links ===
- Buonaiuti, Ernesto (1907). "Alghero," in: The Catholic Encyclopedia Vol. 1 (New York 1907), pp. 310-311.
- Chow, Gabriel. GCatholic.org, "Diocese of Alghero-Bosa"; retrieved 7 December 2025.
- Media related to Roman Catholic Diocese of Alghero-Bosa at Wikimedia Commons
