= Diocese of Ozieri =

Latin Catholic diocese in Italy

Coordinates: 40.5667°N 9.0000°E

Diocese of Ozieri Dioecesis Octeriensis o Othierensis

Catholic
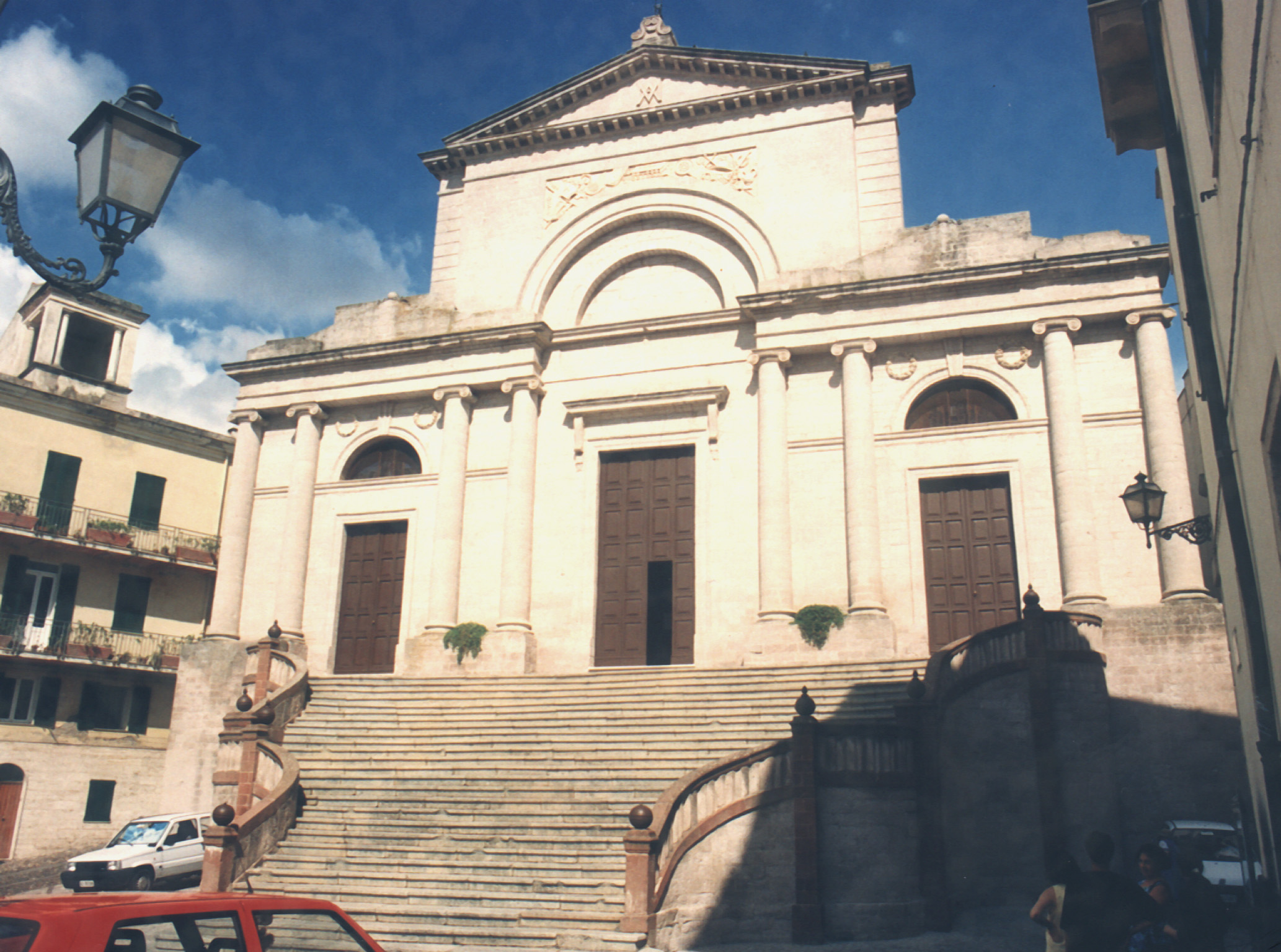
- Ozieri Cathedral

Location
- Country: Italy
- Ecclesiastical province: Sassari

Statistics
- Area: 2,269 km^{2} (876 sq mi)
- Population: Total; Catholics: (as of 2023); 43,872 ▼; 44,219 ▼ (98.5%)
- Parishes: 30

Information
- Denomination: Catholic Church
- Sui iuris church: Latin Church
- Rite: Roman Rite
- Established: 9 March 1804
- Cathedral: Cattedrale della Immacolata Concezione
- Secular priests: 35 (diocesan) ▼3 (religious Orders ▼

Current leadership
- Pope: Leo XIV
- Bishop: Corrado Melis

Website
- www.diocesiozieri.it

The Diocese of Ozieri (Latin: Dioecesis Octeriensis o Othierensis) s a Latin Church diocese of the Catholic Church in Sardinia, Italy. It is a suffragan of the metropolitan Archdiocese of Sassari.

== History ==
The historical Diocese of Bisarchio (Bisarchensis, Gisarchensis) was located in the province of Sassari, district of Nuoro, with the episcopal residence at Ozieri. The first bishop mentioned is Costantino Madrone (c. 1102), who was succeeded in 1116 by Bishop Pietro. The cathedral was built in 1153. The bishop's residence changed several times, to Giracle, and again to Ardera.

In 1170, Archbishop Alberto of Torres (Sassari) presided over a provincial synod, in which the bishop of Bisarchio, Giovanni Thelle, participated.

In 1350, the Doria family of Genoa ceded their rights in Sardinia to the kings of Aragon. Peter IV of Aragon nominated Fra Francesco, the guardian of the Convent of Castellón (diocese of Gerona), to be bishop of Bisarchio; he was approved by Pope Clement VI, and became the first Franciscan bishop in Sardinia.

In 1495, King Ferdinand II of Aragon submitted to Pope Alexander VI a plan for the diminution in the number of dioceses in Sardinia, and the consolidation of several of the dioceses, many of which were suffering financial difficulties.

In 1503, at the death of Bishop Calcerando of Bisarchio, the diocese of Bisarchio was incorporated into the diocese of Alghero.

=== Reestablishment of diocese of Bisarchio ===
The diocese was reestablished by Pope Pius VII in his Bull, "Divina Disponente," of 9 March 1803.

Eighteen months later, Giannantioco Azzei was appointed the first bishop of the restored diocese. In 1819, he was transferred to the archdiocese of Oristano, his birthplace.

The episcopal residence was then definitely transferred to Ozieri.

The change of name took place in 1915.

== Bishops ==
=== Diocese of Bisarchio ===
11th cent. to 1503

- Constantinus de Matrona (1082)
- Nicodemus (1082)
- Gavinus
- Petrus (c. 1112–1127)
- Marianus Thelle (c. 1139–1146)
- Joannes Thelle (c. 1164–1179)
- Joannes (1237)
- Gennarius (1263)
- Bernardus Carboni (c. 1303–1328)
- Comita (Conte) (c. 1330–1341)
- Marzocco Capra (c. 1342–1348)
- Joannes, O.Min. (1349–1350)
- Franciscus, O.Min. (1350–1366)
- Conradus (1366–1371)
- Donatus, O.E.S.A. (1371– before 1386)
- Antonius Antiochius (1386– ? )
- Simon Christophori de Jadra (1412– ? )
- Antonius de Penna (1421–1436)
- Antonius Cano (1436–1448)
- Sisinius (1448–1466)
- Ludovicus de Santa Croce, O.Min. (1466–1485)
- Michael Lopez de Lasorra, O.Min. (1485–1486)
- Garsias Quixada, O.Min. (1486–1490)
- Galcerandus de Andrea, O.Min. (1490–1499/1500)
- Joannes, O.Min. (1500–1503)

=== Diocese of Bisarchio o Bisarcio (Ozieri) ===
Erected: 9 March 1804
Latin Name: Bisarchiensis

- Giovanni Antioco Azzei (1804–1819)
- Domenico Pes, Sch. P. (29 Mar 1819 – 8 Dec 1831 Died)
- Serafino Carchero, O.F.M. Cap. (20 Jan 1834 – 31 Mar 1847 Died)
- Serafino Corrias (24 Nov 1871 – 31 May 1896 Died)
- Filippo Bacciu (1896 – 1914)

[ Pietro Benedetti (15 December 1914) ]

=== Diocese of Ozieri ===
Name Changed: 12 February 1915

- Carmine Cesarano, C.SS.R. (1915 – 1918)
- Francesco Maria Franco (1919 – 1933)
- Igino Maria Serci (1934 – 1938)
- Francesco Cogoni (3 Mar 1939 – 25 Apr 1975 Retired)
- Giovanni Pisanu (4 Mar 1978 – 27 Mar 1997 Retired)
- Sebastiano Sanguinetti (1997 – 2006)
- Sergio Pintor (29 Sep 2006 – 10 Dec 2012 Retired)
- Corrado Melis (18 Jul 2015 – )

== Sources ==
=== Reference Works ===
- Eubel, Conradus, ed. (1913). Hierarchia catholica (in Latin). Vol. 1 (Tomus 1) (second ed.). Münster: Libreria Regensbergiana. p. 263.. Archived.
- Eubel, Conradus, ed. (1914). Hierarchia catholica (in Latin). Vol. 2 (Tomus 2) (second ed.). Münster: Libreria Regensbergiana. p. 159.. Archived.
- Eubel, Conradus, ed. (1923). Hierarchia catholica (in Latin). Vol. 3 (Tomus 3) (second ed.). Münster: Libreria Regensbergiana. p. 163.. Archived.
- Ritzler, Remigius; Sefrin, Pirminus (1968). Hierarchia Catholica medii et recentioris aevi (in Latin). Vol. 7 (1800–1846). Monasterii: Libr. Regensburgiana.
- Ritzler, Remigius; Sefrin, Pirminus (1978). Hierarchia catholica Medii et recentioris aevi (in Latin). Vol. 8 (1846–1903). Il Messaggero di S. Antonio.
- Pięta, Zenon (2002). Hierarchia catholica medii et recentioris aevi (in Latin). Vol. 9 (1903–1922). Padua: Messagero di San Antonio. ISBN 978-88-250-1000-8.

=== Studies ===
- Benigni, U. (1907). "Bisarcio, diocese of," in: The Catholic Encyclopedia Vol. 2 (New York: Robert Appleton 1907), p. 581.
- Cappelletti, Giuseppe (1857). Le chiese d'Italia dalla loro origine sino ai nostri giorni (in Italian). Vol. decimoterzo (13). Venezia: Antonelli. pp. 175–207..
- Kehr, Paul Fridolin. (ed. D. Girgensohn). Italia Pontificia (in Latin), Vol. X: Calabria – Insulae (Turici: Weidmann 1975). p. 450.
- Mattei, Antonio Felice (1758). Sardinia sacra seu De episcopis Sardis historia nunc primò confecta a F. Antonio Felice Matthaejo. (in Latin). Romae: ex typographia Joannis Zempel apud Montem Jordanum, 1758. Pp. 213-218.
- Scano, Dionigi (1940, 1941). Codice diplomatico delle Relazioni fra la Santa Sede e la Sardegna. 2 vols. Cagliari: Arti Grafiche B.C.T. 1940.
- Sotgia, Giovanni Daniel (2014). La diocesi medievale di Castro: dalle origini all'"Iberizzazione" delle istituzioni (secc. X-XVI) Dissertation: Università degli Studi di Padova 2014.
- Tola, Pasquale (1861). Codex diplomaticus Sardiniae, (in Latin and Italian) Vol. 1 (Turin: ex regio typographeo 1861).
