= Archdiocese of Sassari =

Latin Catholic archdiocese in Italy

Coordinates: 40.7333°N 8.5500°E

Archdiocese of Sassari Archidioecesis Turritana

Catholic
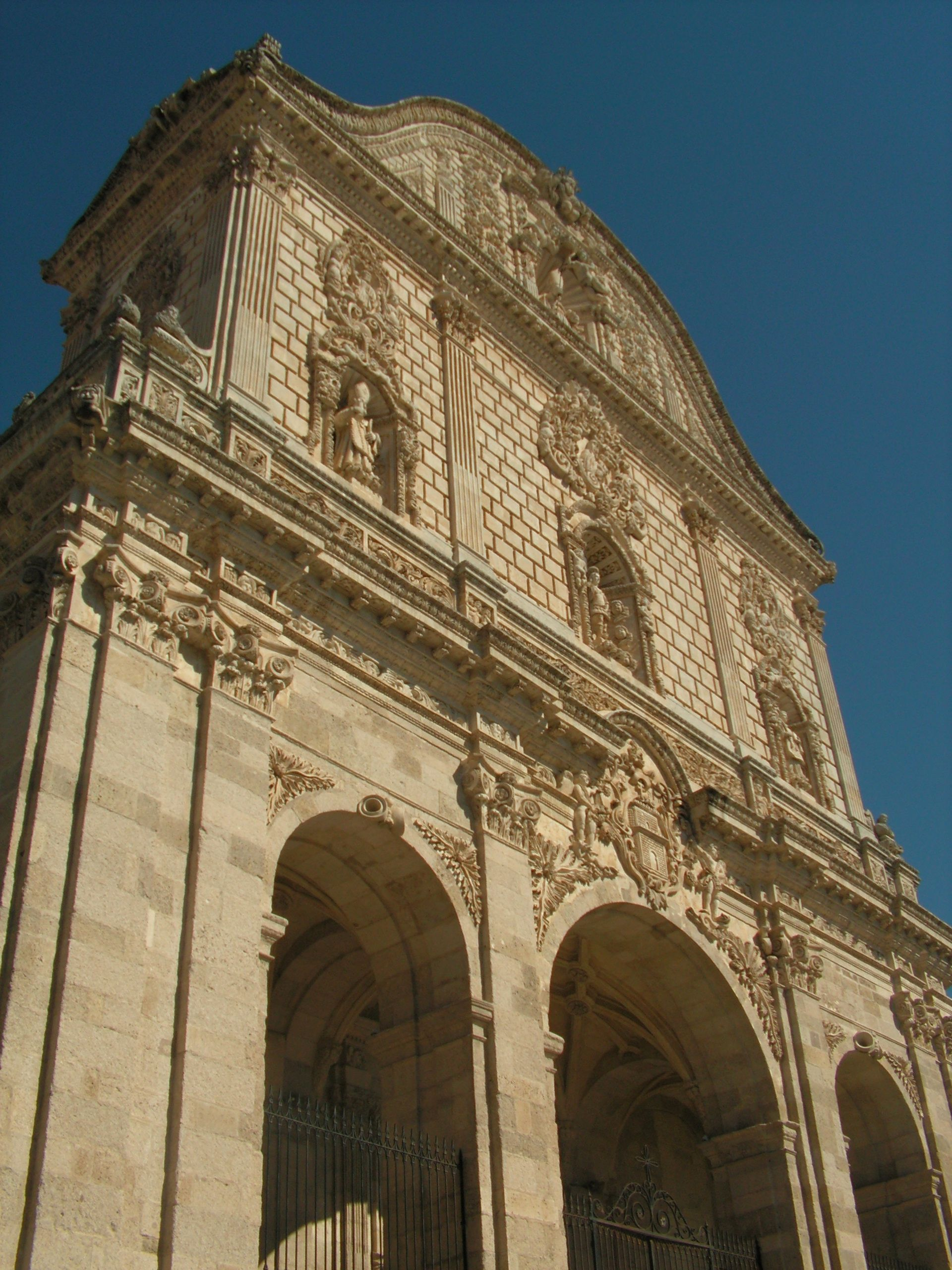
- Sassari Cathedral

Location
- Country: Italy
- Ecclesiastical province: Sassari

Statistics
- Area: 1,978 km^{2} (764 sq mi)
- Population: Total; Catholics: (as of 2023); 220,000 (est.) ▼; 215,000 (est.) ▼
- Parishes: 60

Information
- Denomination: Catholic Church
- Sui iuris church: Latin Church
- Rite: Roman Rite
- Established: 5th century
- Cathedral: Cattedrale di S. Nicola di Bari
- Secular priests: 94 (diocesan); 38 (Religious Orders); 3 Permanent Deacons

Current leadership
- Pope: Leo XIV
- Archbishop: Francesco Antonio Soddu
- Suffragans: Diocese of Alghero-Bosa; Diocese of Ozieri; Diocese of Tempio-Ampurias
- Bishops emeritus: Paolo Mario Virgilio Atzei, O.F.M. Conv.

Website
- arcidiocesisassari.it (in Italian)

The Archdiocese of Sassari (Latin: Archidioecesis Turritana) is a Latin Church archdiocese of the Catholic Church in Sardinia, Italy. Its see was initially at Torres, and the diocese was subhect to the metropolitan of Cagliari. It was elevated to the status of an archdiocese in 1073. From the last quarter of the 13th century, the bishops of Torres habitually resided in Sassari.

The suffragan sees of the archdiocese are the diocese of Alghero-Bosa, the diocese of Ozieri and the diocese of Tempio-Ampurias.

== History ==
The ecclesiastical history of Torres (Turris Lybissonis) goes back to the fourth century. In 304, the soldier Gavinus, Protus a priest, and the deacon Januarius are said to have suffered martyrdom there. A number of martyrs are mentioned in inscriptions found at Porto Torres; all of them are forgeries. Later Gavinus and Protus were reputed bishops, and said to have lived in the second and third centuries respectively. St. Gaudentius, who seems to have belonged to the beginning of the fourth century, is also venerated there.

The first bishop whose date is known is Felix (484).

In July 599, Pope Gregory I wrote to Bishop Marinianus of Torres and five other bishops of Sardinia that they should not ignore their metropolitan, the bishop of Cagliari, and should not venture abroad without his permission.

A bishop, whose name is unknown, often called "Novellus," caused a controversy between Pope John V and the Archbishop of Cagliari in 685. He had been consecrated by the archbishop of Cagliari, though the normal consecrator of bishops of Torres was the pope. Permission had once been granted to the archbishop in an emergency situation, and he evidently attempted to continue the practice as though it were his right. Pope John cancelled the privilege.

Almost nothing is known concerning bishops of Torres for the next three centuries, till Simon (1065). His successor, Costantino de Crasta (1073), was an archbishop. At some point between 1092 and 1098, the papal legate of Pope Urban II, Archbishop Daibertus of Pisa, held a synod of the bishops of Sardinia at Torres. His purpose was to convince Torquitor, the iudex of Gallura, to return to obedience to the Church; on his refusal, the legate condemned and excommunicated him.

Other archbishops: Blasius (1199), representative of Innocent III, on several occasions; Stefano, O.P. (1238), legate of Innocent IV in Sardinia and Corsica; Trogodario (about 1278) who erected the episcopal palace in Sassari, to which Teodosio (1292) added the Church of St. Andrea; after this the archbishops resided habitually at Sassari.

=== Transfer to Sassari ===
Archbishop Pietro Spano (1422–1448) was a restorer of discipline, for which purpose he held a provincial council in Sassari in 1441. During Spano's episcopate, on 3 April 1441, the episcopal seat was definitively transferred to Sassari by Pope Eugenius IV. The name of the diocese, however, remained the same. The bishop intended to erect a seminary for the training of the clergy, but his death frustrated the plan.

Salvatore Salepusi (1553) was distinguished at the Council of Trent. Alfonso de Sorca (1585), was highly esteemed by Clement VIII.

In 1503, Pope Julius II united the Archdiocese of Sassari with the diocese of Ploaghe (Plubium) and the diocese of the Diocese of Sorres (Sorrensis), which had been united permanently with the suppressed diocese of Bosa by Pope Eugenius IV in 1445.

== Bishops and archbishops of Torres ==
Bishops

- ? Felix (c. 484)
- Marinianus (c. 591–599)
- Valentinus (c. 649)
- [Anonymous] (c. 685)

...

- Simon (1065)

=== Archbishops ===
==== From 1073 to 1298 ====
- Constantinus de Castra (c. 1073–1074)
- Christopher (1090)
- Atto (Azzo) (c. 1112–1116)
- Manfred (1116)
- Petrus de Canneto (1134–1139)
- Atto (c. 1139–1146)
- Petrus Manacu (1153–1170)
- Albertus, O.S.B. (c.1170–1178)
- Erbertus, O.Cist. (1181–1196)
- Bandinus (Biagius) (1196 ?–1199)
- Ignotus (c. 1200–1201)
- Biagio (1202–1217)
- Januarius (c. 1218–1226)
- Placentinus (1230)
- Opizzo
- Stephanus, O.P. (1249–1252)
- Prospero (c. 1261–1264)
- Dergotorius (Torgatorius) (c. 1278–1289)
- Pandulfus (1290–1296) Administrator
- Giovanni Balasro, O.Min. (1296–1298)

==== From 1298 to 1422 ====
- Theodicius (Theodoricus) (1298–1322)
- Jacobus (1324–1327)
- Pietro de Portillo, O.P. (1327–1349)
- Bartholomaeus Galmarii (1349–1352)
- Diego de Navasquez, O.Carm. (1354–1355)
- Arnaldus Bordach, O.Cist. (1355–1360)
- Arnaldus Bajuli, O.Min. (1360–1368)
- Bernardus, O.Min. (1368–1369)
- Guglielmo Belvaisii, O.Min. (1369–1371)
- Giacomo de Lanfranchis, O.P. (1371–1372)
- Giacomo Petri, O.P. (1372–1373)
- Giovanni de Fornellis, O.Min. (1373–1387?)
- Giovanni de Passaviis, O.P. (1391-1393) Avignon Obedience
- Guglielmo, Roman Obedience
- Bertrandus, Roman Obedience
- Paulus, Roman Obedience
- Jacobus, Roman Obedience
- Franciscus, Roman Obedience
- Ubaldus Bonamici (1393–1397) Roman Obedience
- Antonio Cippolini, O.P. (1397–1399), Roman Obedience
- Perinus (1399– ), Roman Obedience
- Giovanni de Azaro (1412– ), Pisan Obedience

==== From 1422 to 1700 ====
- Pietro Spano (1422–1448)
- Antonio Cano (1448–1476)
- Giovanni de Sos (1478–1480 )
- Berenger de Sos (1481– ? )
- Francesco Pellicer (1500–1508)
- Angelo Leonini (1509–1517)
- Francesco Minerbetti (1515–1516 Resigned)
- Giovanni Sanna (1516–1523)
- Salvador Alepuz (1524–1568)
- Juan Segría (1568–1569)
- Martín Martínez de Villar (7 Oct 1569-1573
- Miguel Ibáñez (10 Oct 1572-1573)
- Alfonso de Lorca (24 Oct 1576-1603)
- Andrés Bacallar (13 Sep 1604-1612)
- Gavino Manca de Cedrelles (29 Jul 1613-1620)
- Antonio Canopolo (1621-1622)
- Giacomo Passamar (1622-1644)
- Andrea Manca (1644-1652)
- Gaspare Litago (1656-1657)
- Honuphrius Geronda (Gerona) (1659-1660)
- Íñigo (Ignacio) Royo, O.S.B. (1660-1670)
- Gavino Cattayna, O. Carm. (1671-1678)
- Antonio de Vergara, O.P. (1680-1683)
- Juan Morillo Velarde (1685-1699)

==== From 1700 to 2000 ====
- [ Giorgio Sotgia (Soggia) Serra, O.S.M. (1701) ]
- José Sicardo Martinez, O.E.S.A. (1702-1714)
- Gaspar Fuster, C.O. (1714-1720)

Sede Vacante (1720–1726)

- Costanzo Giordini, O.Carm.Disc. (1726-1729)
- Pietro Rovèro di Cortanze, O.F.M. Cap. (1730-1741)
- Matteo Bertolini (1741-1750)
- Carlo Francesco Casanova (1751-1763)
- Giulio Cesare Viancini (16 May 1763 – 1772)
- Giuseppe Maria Incisa Beccaria (1772-1782)
- Angelo Filippo Giacinto Olivieri di Vernier (1784-1787)
- Giacinto della Torre, O.E.S.A. (1790-1797)
- Giovanni Battista Simon (1798-1806)

Sede Vacante (1806–1819)

- Gavino Murro (1819)
- Carlo Tommaso Arnosio (1822-1828)
- Giovanni Antonio Gianotti (1833-1837)
- Alessandro Domenico Varesini (1838-1864)

Sede Vacante (1864–1871)

- Diego Marongiu Delrio (1871-1905)
- Emilio Parodi, C.M. (1905-1916)
- Cleto Cassani (1917-1929 Resigned)
- Maurilio Fossati, O.Ss.G.C.N. (1929-1930)
- Arcangelo Mazzotti, O.F.M. (12 Feb 1931 - 29 Jan 1961)
- Agostino Saba (16 Mar 1961 - 19 Feb 1962)
- Paolo Carta (22 Mar 1962 - 18 Mar 1982 Retired)
- Salvatore Isgró (18 Mar 1982 - 2004)

==== Since 2004 ====
- Paolo Mario Virgilio Atzei, O.F.M. Conv. (2004-2017)
- Gian Franco Saba (2017-2025)
- Francesco Antonio Soddu (21 February 2026–present)

== See also ==
- Diocese of Sorres
- Diocese of Bosa
- Nostra Signora di Tergu

== Sources ==
=== Reference Works ===
- Eubel, Conradus, ed. (1913). Hierarchia catholica (in Latin). Vol. 1 (Tomus 1) (second ed.). Münster: Libreria Regensbergiana. pp. 181–182.. Archived.
- Eubel, Conradus, ed. (1914). Hierarchia catholica (in Latin). Vol. 2 (Tomus 2) (second ed.). Münster: Libreria Regensbergiana. p. 125.. Archived.
- Eubel, Conradus, ed. (1923). Hierarchia catholica (in Latin). Vol. 3 (Tomus 3) (second ed.). Münster: Libreria Regensbergiana. p. 163.. Archived.
- Gams, Pius Bonifatius (1873). Series episcoporum Ecclesiae catholicae: quotquot innotuerunt a beato Petro apostolo. Ratisbon: Typis et Sumptibus Georgii Josephi Manz. pp. 946–947. (Use with caution; obsolete)
- Gauchat, Patritius (Patrice) (1935). Hierarchia catholica (in Latin). Vol. IV (1592-1667). Münster: Libraria Regensbergiana.
- Ritzler, Remigius; Sefrin, Pirminus (1952). Hierarchia catholica medii et recentis aevi (in Latin). Vol. V (1667-1730). Patavii: Messagero di S. Antonio.
- Ritzler, Remigius; Sefrin, Pirminus (1958). Hierarchia catholica medii et recentis aevi (in Latin). Vol. 6 (1730-1799). Patavii: Messagero di S. Antonio.
- Ritzler, Remigius; Sefrin, Pirminus (1968). Hierarchia Catholica medii et recentioris aevi (in Latin). Vol. 7 (1800–1846). Monasterii: Libr. Regensburgiana.
- Ritzler, Remigius; Sefrin, Pirminus (1978). Hierarchia catholica Medii et recentioris aevi (in Latin). Vol. 8 (1846–1903). Il Messaggero di S. Antonio.
- Pięta, Zenon (2002). Hierarchia catholica medii et recentioris aevi (in Latin). Vol. 9 (1903–1922). Padua: Messagero di San Antonio. ISBN 978-88-250-1000-8.

=== Studies ===
- Benigni, U. (1912), "Sassari, Archdiocese of (Turritana)" in: The Catholic Encyclopedia (1st ed.), Volume 13 (New York: Robert Appleton Company, 1912), p. 485.
- Cappelletti, Giuseppe (1857). Le chiese d'Italia dalla loro origine sino ai nostri giorni (in Italian). Vol. decimoterzo (13). Venezia: Antonelli. pp. 111–137..
- Delrio, Didacus Marongio (1877) Constitutiones et decreta edita et promulgata in synodo diaecesana turritana. (in Latin). Saceri: J. Dessi, 1877. (List of bishops and archbishops: pp. 237-245).
- Gams, Pius Bonifatius (1873). Series episcoporum Ecclesiae catholicae: quotquot innotuerunt a beato Petro apostolo (in Latin). Ratisbon: Typis et Sumptibus Georgii Josephi Manz. pp. 839–840.
- Kehr, Paul Fridolin. Italia Pontificia (in Latin), Vol. X: Calabria – Insulae (Turici: Weidmann 1975). pp. 424–435.
- Lanzoni, Francesco (1927). Le diocesi d'Italia dalle origini al principio del secolo VII (an. 604) (in Italian). Rome: Biblioteca Apostolica Vaticana. pp. 673-677.
- Martini, Pietro (1841). Storia ecclesiastica di Sardegna. Volume 3 Cagliari: Stamperia Reale, 1841. (pp. 329-336).
- Mattei, Antonio Felice (1758). Sardinia sacra seu De episcopis Sardis historia nunc primò confecta a F. Antonio Felice Matthaejo. (in Latin). Romae: ex typographia Joannis Zempel apud Montem Jordanum, 1758. Pp. 138-171.
- Pintus, Sebastiano. "Vescovi e arcivescovi di Torres, oggi Sassari," (in Italian), in: Archivio storico Sardo, Volume 1 (Cagliari: Dessi 1905), pp. 62–85.
- Vidili, Massimiliano (2008). "La cronotassi documentata degli arcivescovi di Torres dal 1065 al 1298," (in Italian). In: Bollettino di Studi Sardi, Vol. 1, 2008, pp. 73–127.
