= Capo San Marco Lighthouse =

Lighthouse in Sardinia, Italy

Capo San Marco
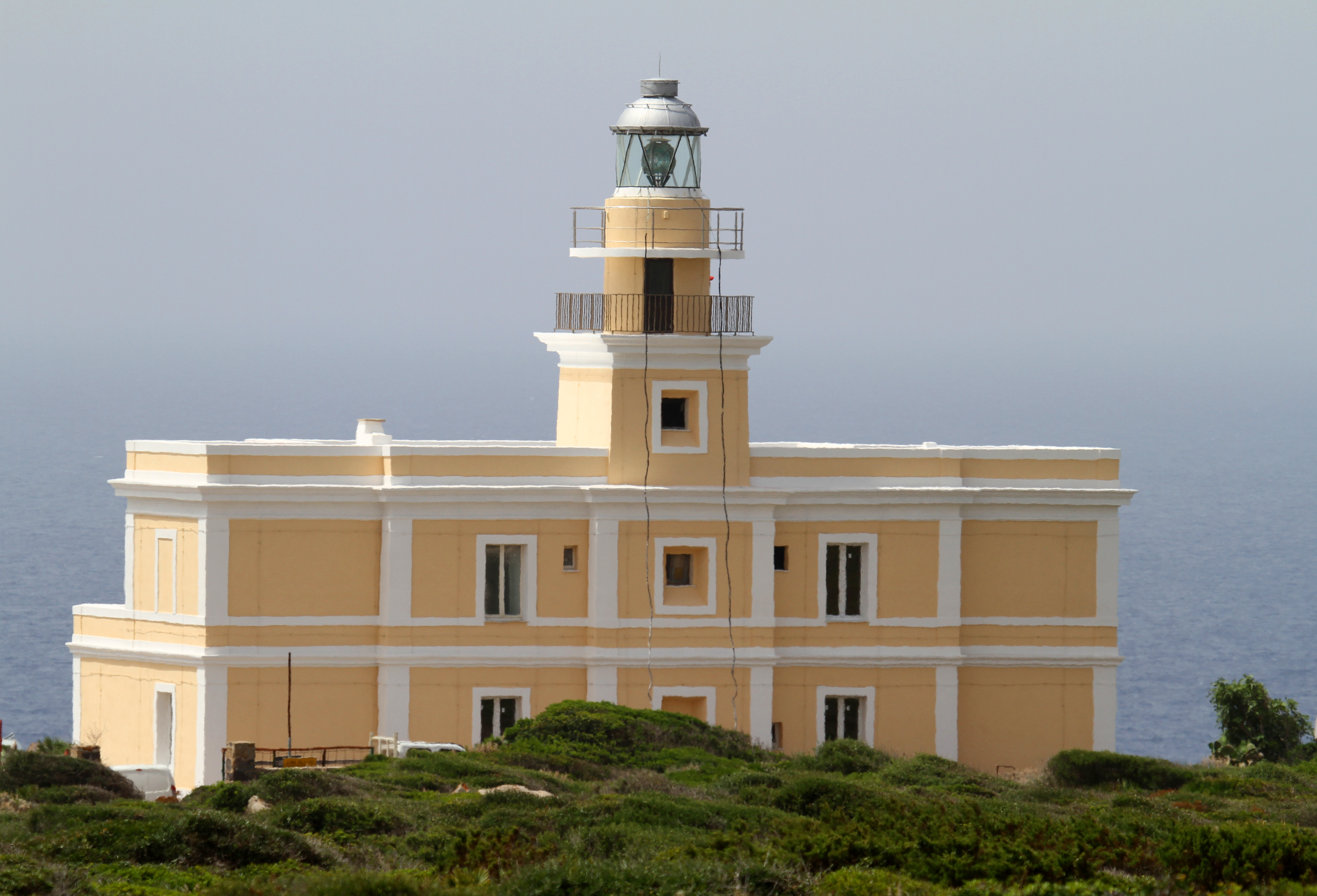
- Capo San Marco Lighthouse
- Location: Capo San Marco; Cabras; Sardinia; Italy
- Coordinates: 39°51′36″N 8°26′04″E

Tower
- Constructed: 1924
- Foundation: concrete base
- Construction: masonry tower
- Automated: yes
- Height: 15 metres (49 ft)
- Shape: quadrangular tower with double balcony and lantern
- Markings: ochre tower and lantern with white trim, grey metallic lantern dome
- Power source: mains electricity
- Operator: Marina Militare
- Fog signal: no

Light
- Focal height: 57 metres (187 ft)
- Lens: Type ORD 4
- Intensity: main: AL 1000 W reserve: LABI 100 W
- Range: mains: 22 nautical miles (41 km; 25 mi) reserve: 18 nautical miles (33 km; 21 mi)
- Characteristic: Fl (2) W 10s.
- Italy no.: 1390 E.F.

Capo San Marco Lighthouse (Italian: Faro di Capo San Marco) is an active lighthouse located on Capo San Marco promontory, on the tip of Sinis peninsula overlooking the ruins below of Tharros. The structure is in the municipality of Cabras, in the west of the island on the Sea of Sardinia.

== Description ==
The lighthouse was built in 1924 and consists of a masonry ochre quadrangular tower, 15 metres (49 ft) high, with double balcony and lantern atop a 2-storey keeper's house. The lantern, which mounts an optics of Type ORD 4, is painted in ochre and the dome in grey metallic; it is positioned at 57 metres (187 ft) above sea level and emits two white flashes in a 10 seconds period visible up to a distance of 22 nautical miles (41 km; 25 mi). The lighthouse is completely automated and managed by the Marina Militare with the identification code number 1390 E.F.

The lighthouse, since 1969, was managed by Elisabetta Deriu widow of the lighthouse keeper who died in service in 1967; she succeed to get her husband's job and she became the first female keeper in Italy after attending the professional training course in La Spezia.

== See also ==
- List of lighthouses in Italy
