= Tharros =

Ancient city in Sardinia, Italy

Coordinates: 39.8733°N 8.43972°E

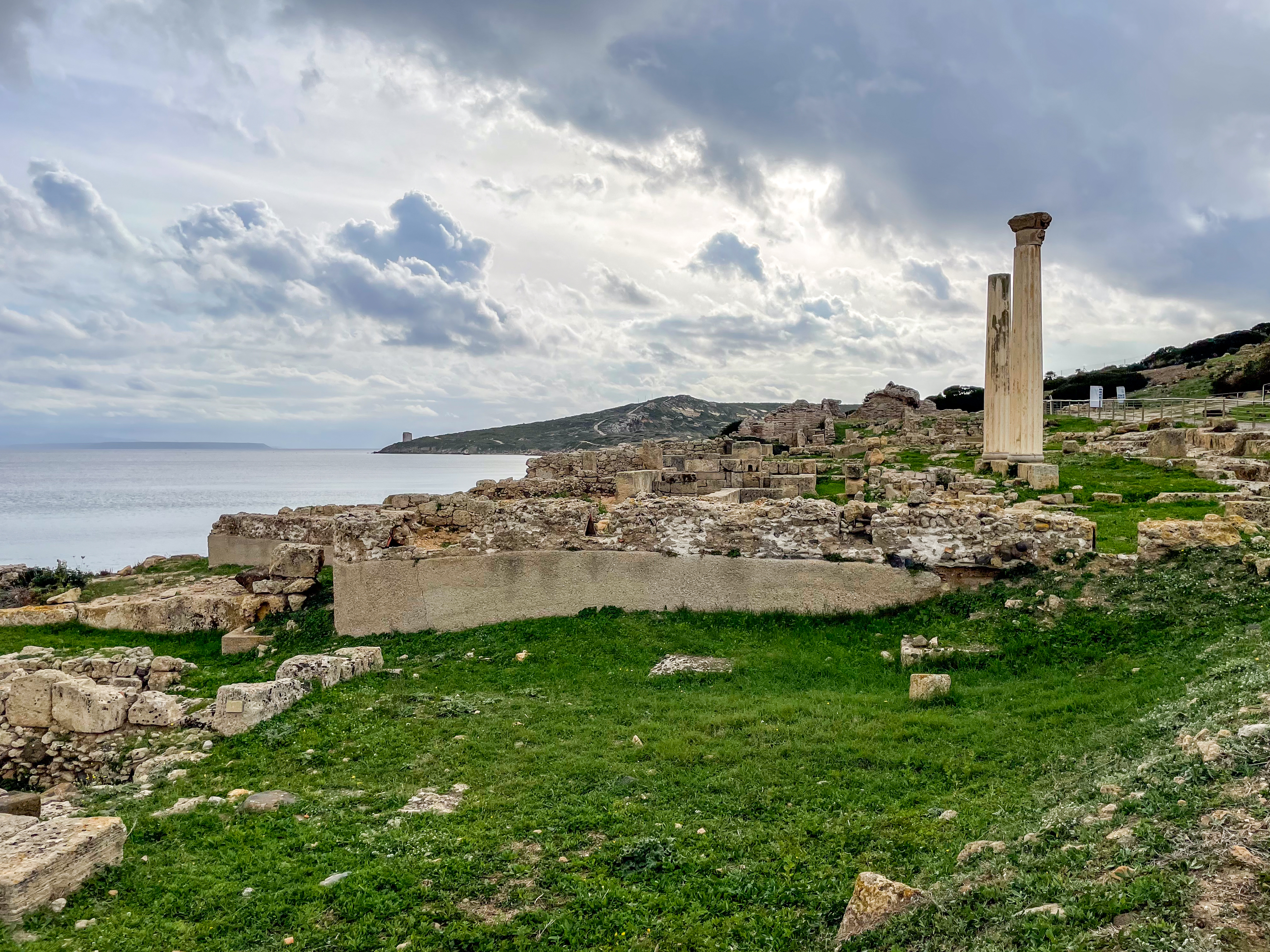
- View of Tharros and the reconstructed Corinthian columns

- Location within Sardinia
- Type: Settlement
- Cultures: Nuragic civilization, Punic civilization, Roman civilization

History
- Built: Eighth century BCE

Site notes
- Condition: Ruined
- Management: I Beni Culturali della Sardegna
- Public access: Yes
- Website: official website

Tharros (also spelled Tharras, Archaic Greek: Θάρρας, Ptolemaic Hellenistic: Τάρραι/Τάρρας, Tárrai/Tárras; Latin: Tarrhae/Tarrhas) was an ancient city and former bishopric on the west coast of Sardinia, Italy. It is currently a Latin Catholic titular see and an archaeological site near the village of San Giovanni di Sinis, municipality of Cabras, in the Province of Oristano. It is located on the southern shore of the Sinis peninsula, which forms the northern cape of the Bay of Oristano, by the cape of San Marco. Tharros, mentioned by Ptolemy and in the Itineraries, seems to have been one of the most important places on the island.

== History ==
=== Foundation ===
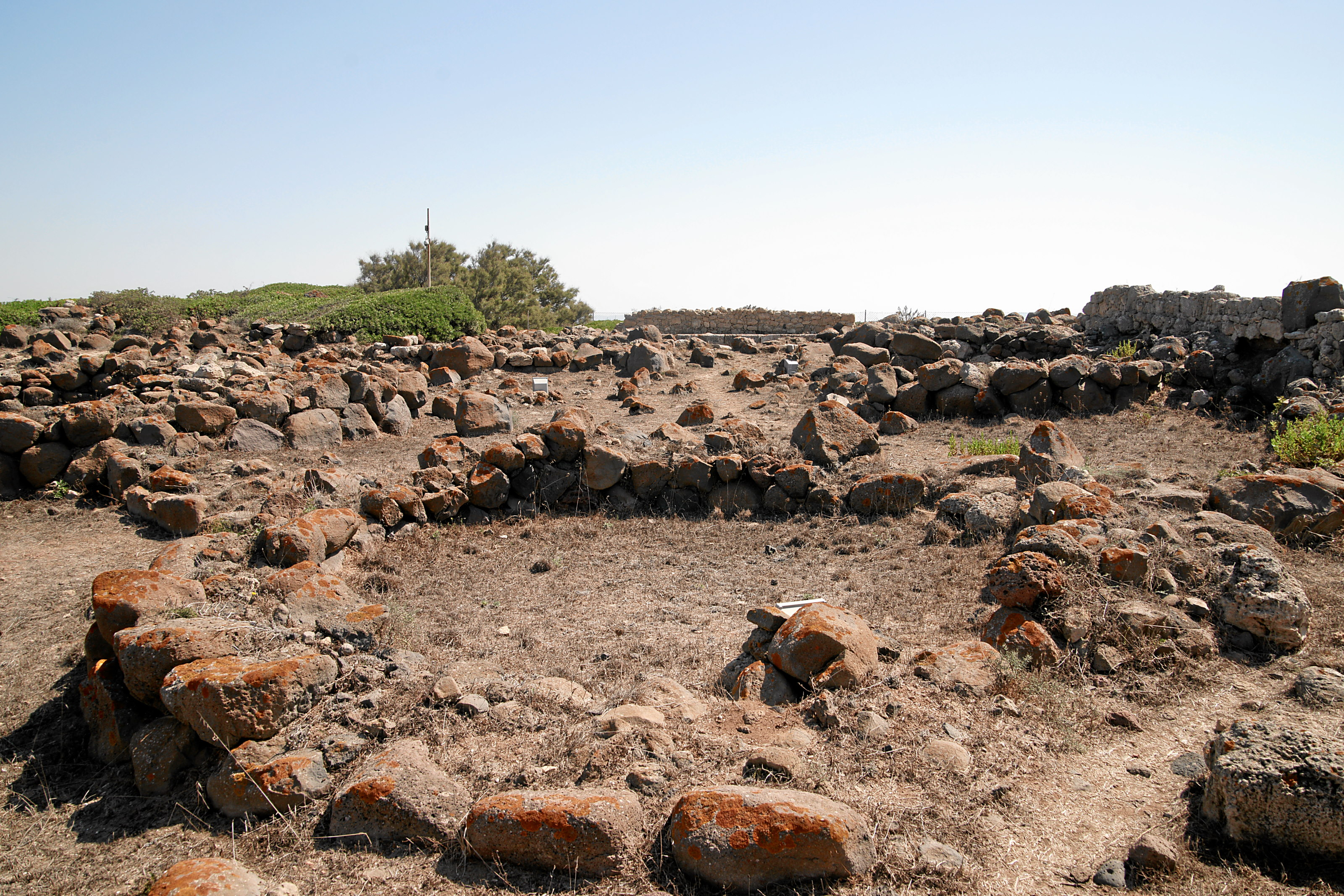
The Nuragic village

Until some years ago, the archaeological findings in the area of Tharros supported the theory that Phoenicians founded the town in eighth century BC. The probability of this was reduced by the finding of some parts of the old settlement in the Mistras Lagoon. A submerged 100 m wall seems to be part of a port structure much older than the Phoenician one, since in 1200 BC sea level rose, swallowing the existing buildings. A previous nuragic settlement apparently existed there in the Bronze Age, as the nuragic presence near the tophet area seems to suggest.

=== Thopeth ===
Archaeologists found a tophet, an open-air sacred place common for several installations of Phoenicians in the western Mediterranean, on top of a hill called Su Muru Mannu near the remains of a village built by the Nuragic peoples (1900-730 BC). This is seen as a first sign of colonization and urbanization.

=== Later history ===
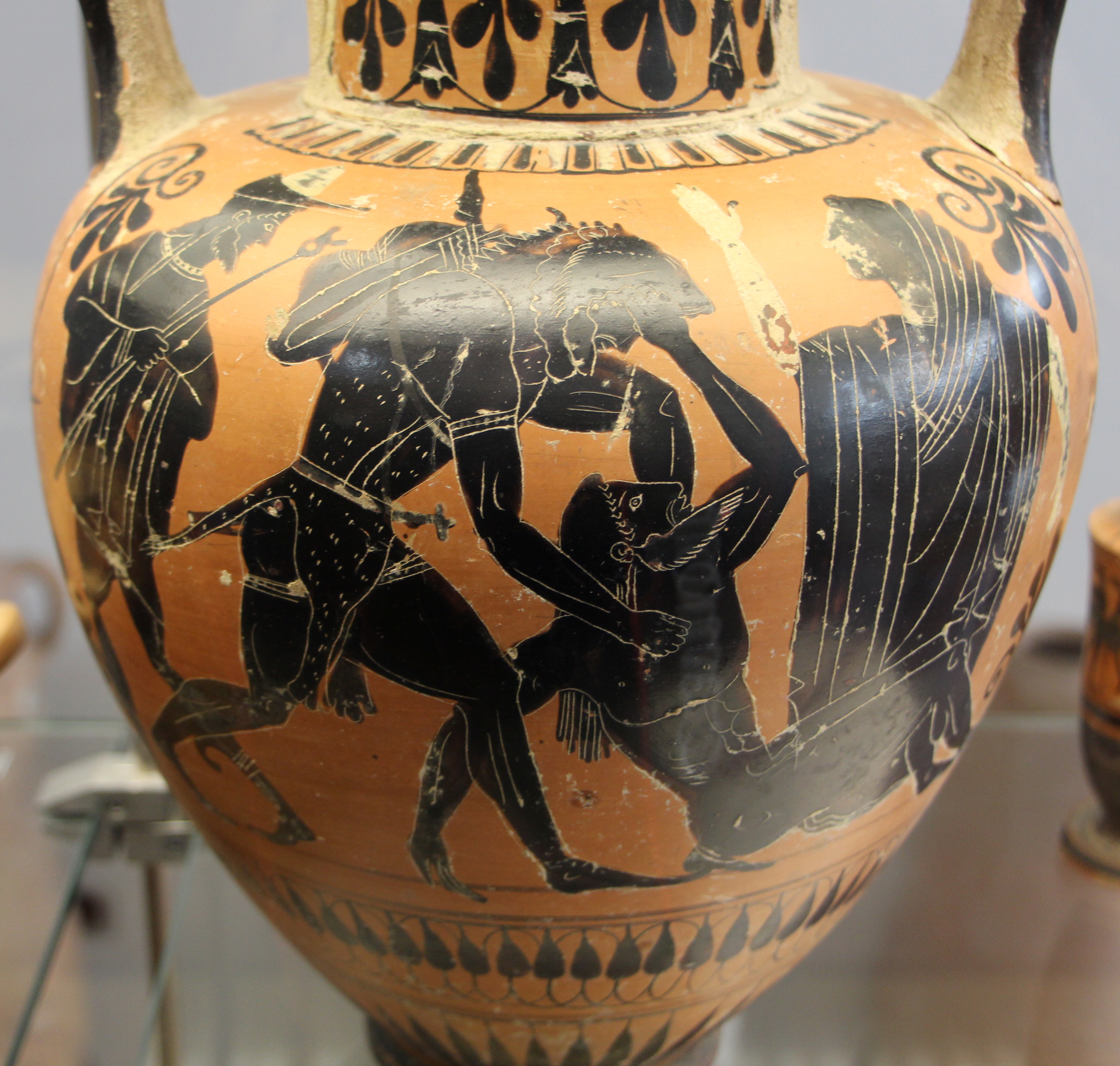
Attic amphora depicting Heracles and Antaeus

Excavations showed that from the 8th century BC until its abandonment in the 10th century Tharros was inhabited, first by Phoenicians, then by Punics and then by Romans. The town was the capital of the medieval Giudicato of Arborea, a Roman/Byzantine relict state from the 9th century until 1070 when Orzocorre I of Arborea relocated to Oristano under pressure of Saracen raiders. The town was effectively abandoned at this time or shortly thereafter. The site was then used for centuries as a quarry. An inscription records the repair of the road from Tharras to Cornus as late as the reign of Roman emperor Philip. The Antonine Itinerary correctly places it 18 miles from Cornus and 12 from Othoca (modern Santa Giusta near Oristano). However, its history during most of the period of Roman domination or early Christianity is unknown.

== Diocese ==
=== Residential diocese ===
The Diocese of Tharros was established around the year 400, its only presumably historically recorded bishop being Johannes circa 500. It was renamed as the Diocese of Sinis-Tharros in 700. In 800 it gained territory from the suppressed Diocese of Cornus.

From 1000 it was promoted the Metropolitan Archdiocese of Sinis-Tharros, apparently to match the prestige of the Giudice (feudal temporal governor) of Arborea, which had taken residence there, with two suffragan sees: Diocese of Santa Giusta and Diocese of Terralba and Uselli. In 1070 it lost territory to establish the Diocese of Bosa.

It was formally suppressed in 1093, its territory being reassigned to establish of the Metropolitan Archdiocese of Oristano, where its seat had been established in 1070 following the depopulation of the city thereto.

=== Titular see ===
In 1755 the diocese was nominally restored as Latin titular bishopric, bearing the name of Sinita until it was renamed Sinis in 1793. Its incumbents were/are of the fitting Episcopal (lowest) rank, with an Archiepiscopal exception (title Tharros).

== Site ==
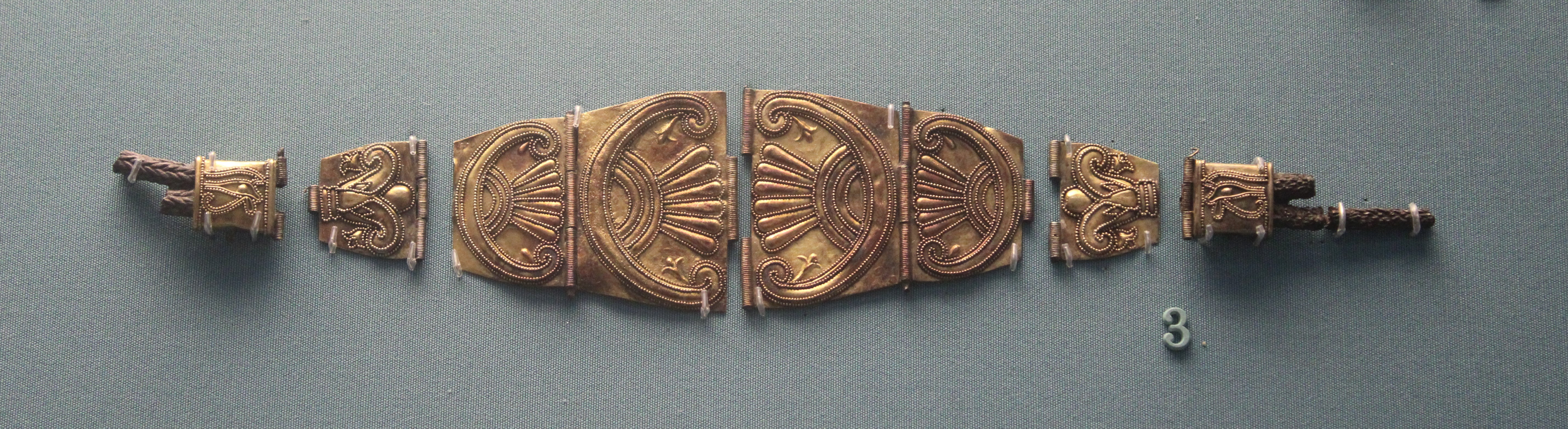
Phoenician gold diadem from Tharros in the British Museum

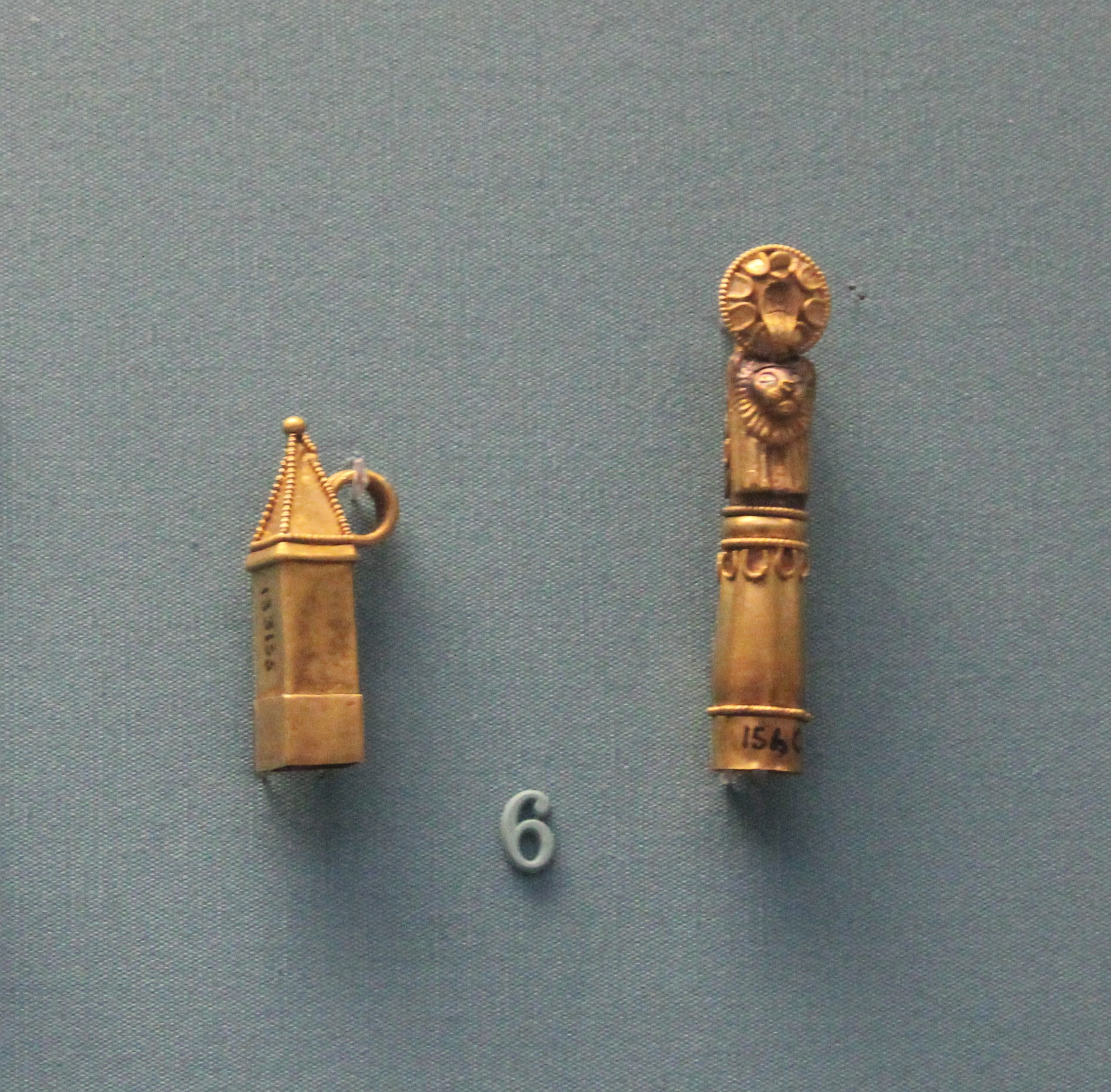
Gold amulet cases from Tharros in the BM

The area is now an open-air museum with active excavation sites. Among the interesting structures are the tophet, the bath installations, the temple foundations and an area with houses and artisan workshops.

Most of the artifacts can be found in the Archaeological Museum at Cagliari, in the Antiquarium Arborense, the Archaeological Museum of the town of Cabras and in the British Museum, London.

== In literature ==
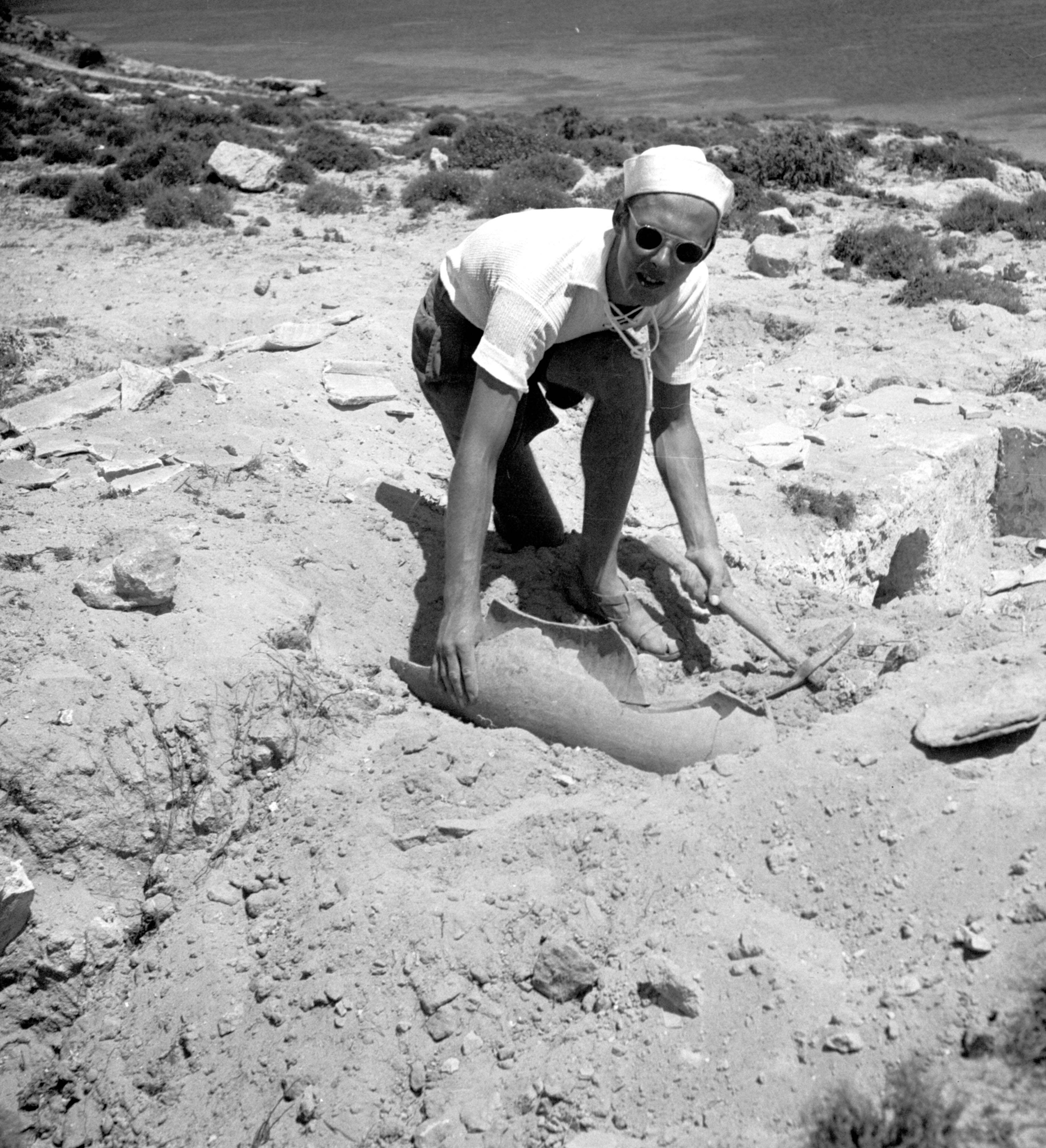
Finnish writer Göran Schildt at Tharros in 1949

Finnish writer Göran Schildt visited and photographed Tharros on his travels in the Mediterranean Sea with his boat Daphne.

== Paleogenetics ==
A 2021 Ancient DNA study by Stefania Sarno et al., found that among 14 individuals, buried in the Punic Age southern necropolis of Tharros, there were people coming from North Africa and the Iberian Peninsula. The modern inhabitants of Cabras and Belvì mainly cluster, instead, with the indigenous Pre-Phoenician inhabitants of the Island and with the other modern populations of Sardinia.

== See also ==
- List of Catholic dioceses in Italy

== Sources and bibliography ==
- Acquaro, E.; C. Finzi (1986). Tharros. Sassari.
- Osborne R. and B. Cunliffe, ed. (2005). Mediterranean Urbanization 800-600 BC. New York.
- GCatholic - former and titular bishopric
