= Antonino Orrù =

Roman Catholic prelate (1928–2022)

His Excellency Antonino Orrù
- Bishop Emeritus of Ales-Terralba
- Archdiocese: Oristano
- Diocese: Ales-Terralba
- Appointed: 9 April 1990
- Term ended: 5 February 2004
- Predecessor: Giovanni Paolo Gibertini
- Successor: Giovanni Dettori

Orders
- Ordination: 13 July 1952
- Consecration: 13 May 1990 by Ottorino Pietro Alberti

Personal details
- Born: 23 April 1928 Sinnai, Italy
- Died: 13 August 2022 (aged 94) Cagliari, Italy

Antonino Orrú (23 April 1928 – 13 August 2022) was an Italian Roman Catholic prelate.

Orrú was born in Italy and was ordained to the priesthood in 1952. He served as bishop of the Roman Catholic Diocese of Ales-Terralba, Italy from 1990 until his retirement in 2004. He died on 13 August 2022, at the age of 94.

Catholic Church titles
Preceded by Giovanni Paolo Gibertini	Bishop of Ales-Terralba; 1990–2004	Succeeded by Giovanni Dettori
