= Sinis =

Sinis may refer to:

== Places ==
- Sinis peninsula in western Sardinia, forming the northern cape of the Bay of Oristano
- Titular see of Sinis, Catholic diocese
- Sinis, now called Sinno, a river in southern Italy

== Other ==
- Sinis (mythology), also known as Pityokamptes, a bandit killed by Theseus in Greek mythology
- Sinis, the name of a powerful Shade in the Myth (computer game series) slain by Alric in single combat
