= Adriano Caprioli =

Italian Roman Catholic bishop (1936–2026)

His Excellency, The Most Reverend Adriano Caprioli
- Bishop of Reggio Emilia–Guastalla
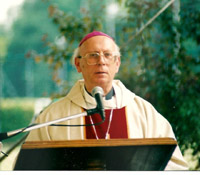
- Church: Roman Catholic Church
- Archdiocese: Modena–Nonantola
- Diocese: Reggio Emilia–Guastalla
- Appointed: 27 June 1998
- Installed: 20 September 1998
- Term ended: 29 September 2012
- Predecessor: Giovanni Paolo Gibertini
- Successor: Massimo Camisasca
- Previous post: Chaplain of His Holiness (1987–1998)

Orders
- Ordination: 28 June 1959 by Giovanni Battista Montini
- Consecration: 12 September 1998 by Carlo Maria Martini, Pasquale Macchi and Giovanni Paolo Gibertini

Personal details
- Born: Adriano Caprioli; 16 May 1936 Solbiate Olona, Lombardy, Kingdom of Italy
- Died: 4 July 2026 (aged 90) Reggio Emilia, Emilia-Romagna, Italy
- Education: Pontifical Gregorian University
- Motto: Veritas et amor
- Coat of arms

Styles of Adriano Caprioli
- Reference style: His Excellency; The Most Reverend
- Spoken style: Your Excellency
- Religious style: Bishop

Adriano Caprioli (16 May 1936 – 4 July 2026) was an Italian Roman Catholic prelate who served as Bishop of Reggio Emilia–Guastalla from 1998 until his retirement in 2012.

== Early life and education ==
Caprioli was born on 16 May 1936 in Solbiate Olona, in the Archdiocese of Milan. He studied at the Archepiscopal Seminary of Milan before continuing his theological education at the Pontifical Lombard Seminary in Rome. In 1961, he obtained a degree in theology from the Pontifical Gregorian University.

He was ordained to the priesthood for the Archdiocese of Milan on 28 June 1959 by Cardinal Giovanni Battista Montini, the future Pope Paul VI at Milan Cathedral.

== Priestly ministry ==
Following his ordination and studies at the Pontifical Gregorian University in Rome, Caprioli taught liturgy, systematic theology and spiritual theology at the diocesan seminaries of Masnago and Venegono Inferiore. From 1979 to 1993, he served as director of the Ambrosian Foundation Paolo VI and the Higher Institute of Religious Studies at Villa Cagnola. In 1993, he was appointed provost of the Basilica of San Magno in Legnano, later becoming dean of the area.

On 24 April 1987 Pope John Paul II named him a Chaplain of His Holiness with the title of Monsignor.

== Episcopal ministry ==
On 27 June 1998, Pope John Paul II appointed Caprioli Bishop of Reggio Emilia–Guastalla following the retirement of Giovanni Paolo Gibertini.

Caprioli received episcopal consecration on 12 September 1998 in Milan Cathedral from Cardinal Carlo Maria Martini, with Archbishop Pasquale Macchi and Bishop Giovanni Paolo Gibertini serving as co-consecrators. He took canonical possession of the diocese on 20 September 1998.

Between 2000 and 2005, Caprioli served as president of the committee responsible for the Italian National Eucharistic Congresses. He was also a member of the Italian Episcopal Conference's Episcopal Commission for the Liturgy.

Pope Benedict XVI accepted his resignation from the pastoral governance of the Diocese of Reggio Emilia-Guastalla on 29 September 2012 upon his reaching the canonical age limit, and appointed Massimo Camisasca as his successor.

== Death ==
Caprioli died at the Hospital Santa Maria Nuova in Reggio Emilia, in the early morning of 4 July 2026, at the age of 90.

Catholic Church titles
Preceded by Giovanni Paolo Gibertini	Bishop of Reggio Emilia–Guastalla; 1998–2012	Succeeded by Massimo Camisasca
