= Spotorno (surname) =

Spotorno is a last name. Notable people with this last name include:

- Diego Spotorno (born 1975), Ecuadorian actor and television host
- Domenico Spotorno, Italian architect who built the Ales Cathedral in 1687
- Juan Bautista Spotorno (1832–1917), president of Cuba
