= Santa Giusta Cathedral =

Cathedral in Santa Giusta, Italy

Coordinates: 39.881667°N 8.607222°E

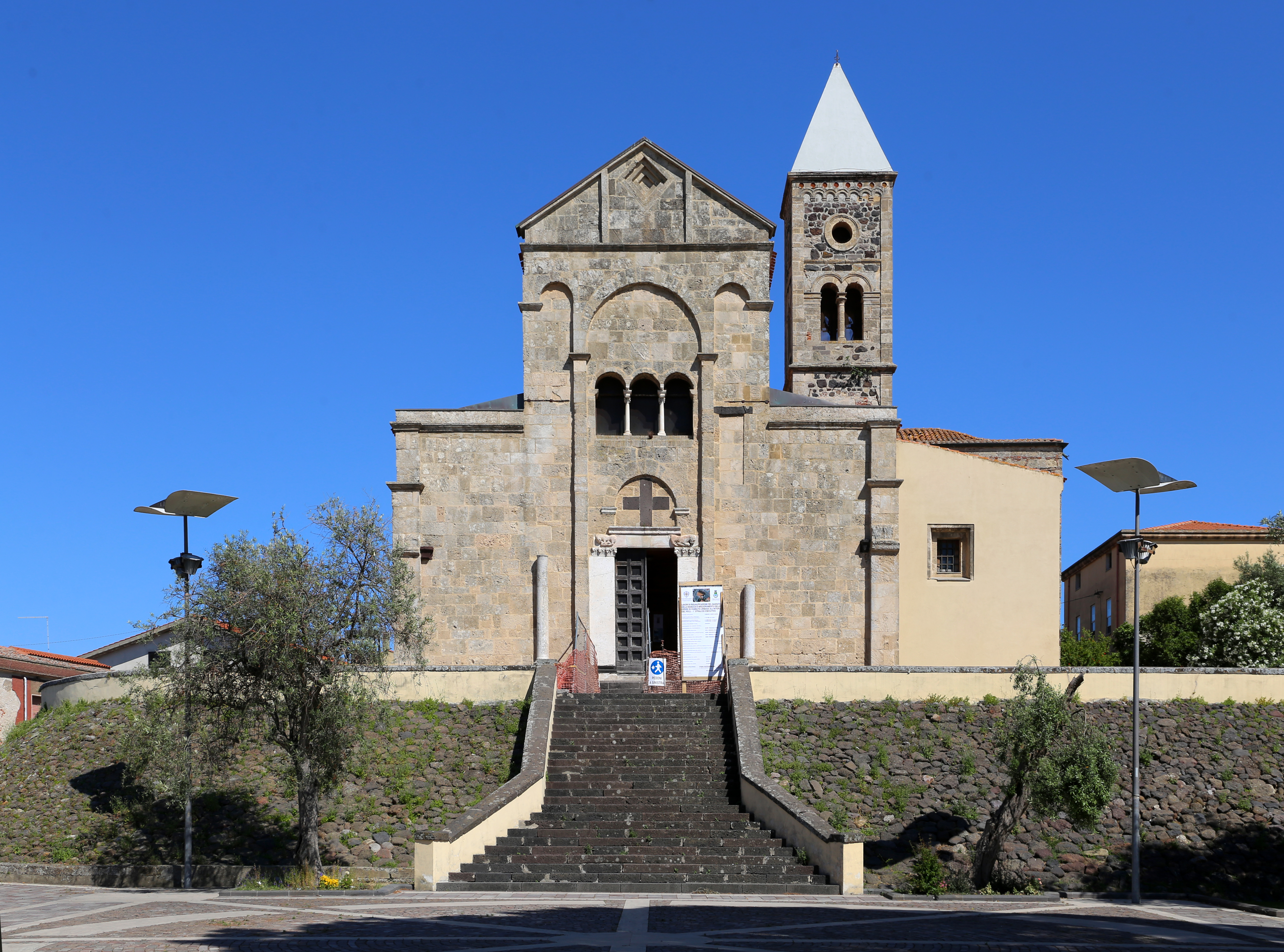
Santa Giusta Cathedral

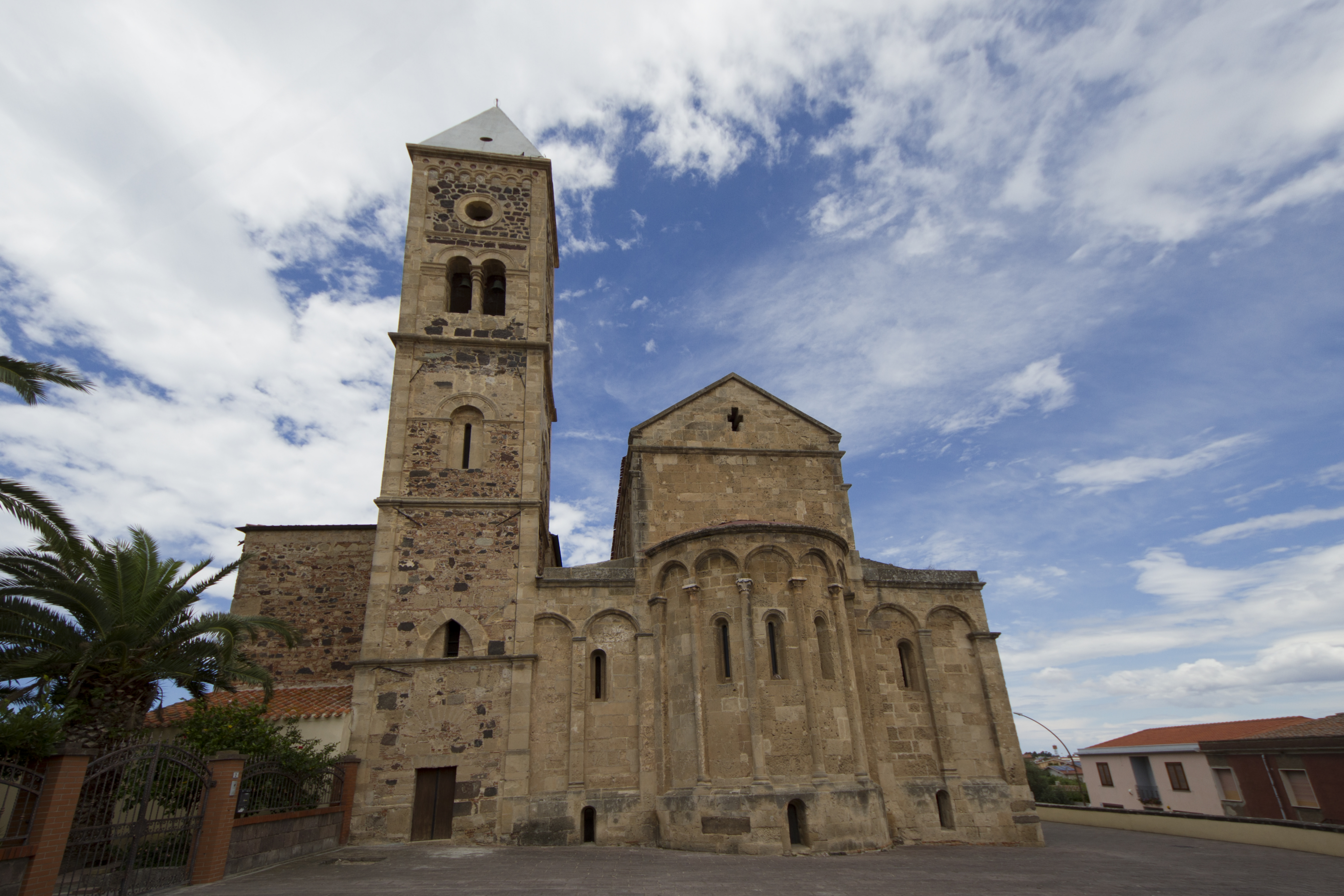
Back of the building

Santa Giusta Cathedral, now a minor basilica (Italian: Basilica di Santa Giusta) is the former cathedral of the abolished Diocese of Santa Giusta, in Santa Giusta, province of Oristano, Sardinia, Italy. The dedication is to Saint Justa of Cagliari who, according to the tradition, was martyred here at the time of the Roman emperor Diocletian, with her companions Saints Justina and Aenidina. Almost entirely built in sandstone, it is considered one of the most important examples of Sardinian Romanesque architecture.

== History ==
The cathedral was erected in the early 12th century by local and Pisan workers, the latter with experience from Pisa Cathedral. Some art historians have supposed that another church existed on the site previously, but this has not been definitely proven.

In the 16th-17th centuries the south wall was demolished to allow creation of two chapels. In 1503 the Diocese of Santa Giusta was abolished and annexed to that of Oristano. In 1847 a marble enclosure was built to encircle the presbytery, while a pulpit was added in 1876. In 1860 the former sail-shaped bell tower collapsed, and was replaced by a square bell tower in neo-Romanesque style, finished in 1906.

== Overview ==
The basilica has a façade in undecorated sandstone, with three bays corresponding to the interior's nave and two aisles. The central one has the main portal, surmounted by a triple mullioned window. The façade is topped by a tympanum also divided into three parts, the central one featuring a lozenge. Near the pilasters flanking the portal are two old columns, leading to the hypothesis that the church once had a portico or similar structure.

The side walls are divided into blind arches with Lombard bands, but have few decorations otherwise. More numerous are the features of the apse, with semi-columns supported by plinths and ending in leaf-shaped capitals, Lombard bands and six single-mullioned windows (the three lower ones lighting the church's crypt).

In the interior the aisles and the nave are divided by seven columns with arcades, made of material from ancient settlements of the area. The aisles are covered by groin vaults, while the nave has trusses. The columns in the crypt are original.

== Sources ==
- Coroneo, Roberto (1993). Architettura Romanica dalla metà del Mille al primo '300. Nuoro: Ilisso. ISBN 88-85098-24-X.
