= Ales Cathedral (Sardinia) =

Coordinates: 39.768611°N 8.816111°E

- Cattedrale dei Santi Pietro e Paolo
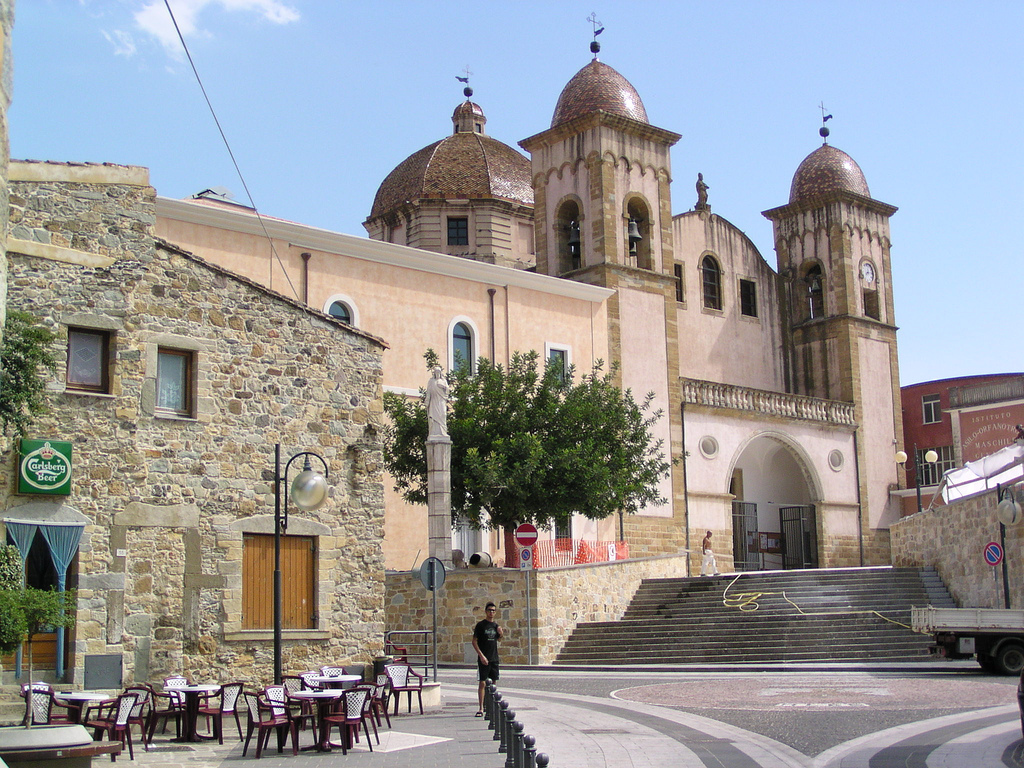
- Cattedrale di San Pietro
- Ales Cathedral
- Location: Ales, Sardinia
- Country: Italy
- Denomination: Roman Catholicism

History
- Status: Cathedral
- Dedication: Saint Peter and Saint Paul
- Consecrated: May 9, 1688

Architecture
- Functional status: Active
- Architect: Domenico Spotorno
- Architectural type: Baroque

Administration
- Diocese: Diocese of Ales-Terralba

Ales Cathedral (Italian: Duomo di Ales, Cattedrale dei Santi Pietro e Paolo) is the parish church of Ales, a small town in the province of Oristano, Sardinia, Italy, and the cathedral of the diocese of Ales-Terralba (the diocesan museum is also located there). The dedication is to Saint Peter and Saint Paul.

== History ==
Location of Ales Cathedral

The present cathedral, built in 1687 by architect Domenico Spotorno, was constructed on the ruins of an earlier church built at the expense of Donna Violante Carroz, Marchioness of Quirra (1456-1510), at the time of the transfer of the seat of the diocese of Usellus to Ales. The first cathedral had a Romanesque nave with a truss roof and a small bell tower, three chapels (dedicated to Our Lady of Mount Carmel, Our Lady of the Rosary, and the Crucifix), and a sacristy, which was replaced by a new one in 1627. The building was enlarged in 1634, probably with walling of large blocks of white stone, and four additional chapels. In the time of Bishop Brunengo the nave and the apse were covered with barrel vaulting. In 1648 Brunengo started building one of two planned towers, but it collapsed on April 29, 1683, for reasons never discovered, and in its fall almost completely destroyed the rest of the church.

Construction of the present cathedral was begun in 1687 to plans drawn up by the architect Domenico Spotorno, who had died on June 17, 1684, in Ales and was later buried in the new building. He had previously worked on the conversion of the Baroque cathedral of Cagliari, which served as a model for the cathedral of Ales.

The new cathedral was completed after the death of Spotorno by the architect Ignatius Merigano, with the help of the master builders Antonio Cuccuru and Lucifero Marceddu of Cagliari. It was consecrated by Bishop Didoco (Domenico) Cugia on May 9, 1688.

Along the boundary wall with the Chapel of San Michele and the clock tower, traces can still be seen of the tower that collapsed.

The building was equipped during the 18th century with marble furnishings of good workmanship, by the sculptor Pietro Pozzo and his school. In the first half of the 20th century the decorations and frescoes of the interior were completed. Major renovations, in progress during some twenty years, have recently been completed.

== Description ==
=== Exterior ===
The cathedral is located on a terrace overlooking a wide piazza, dominating the centre of the village. The west front, with a curved top, is framed by two bell towers, connected by a terrace equipped with a tufa balustrade, beneath which is a portico with a round arch. On the top of the façade is a statue of Saint Peter. Each tower has a cupola and behind is the great central dome over the crossing.

=== Interior ===
The cathedral has a Latin cross floorplan. The nave is 21 metres long and 10 metres wide, divided from the side-aisles by pilasters with Ionic capitals, with two side chapels and a large transept, the arms of which extend 7.80 metres. The choir is 10 metres long and 7.40 metres wide. The chapels and apse are barrel-vaulted, as are the nave and the transept, except of course at the crossing, which is roofed by the large octagonal dome (36 metres high), covered with decorations (1950-1962) and frescoes (1954), the more recent work by Peppinetto Boi Ales. The frescoes include, from left to right: the Martyrdom of Saint Peter; medallion of Saint Gregory the Great; the Glory of Saint Peter; medallion of Saint Ambrose; the Martyrdom of Saint Paul; medallion of Saint Augustine; the Glory of Saint Paul; and a medallion of Saint Jerome. The central vault is 16 metres high, and the two towers are 26 metres high.

The vaults are decorated with frescoes (1907) by Giovanni da Ferraboschi of Bergamo, depicting the main incidents of the lives of Saints Peter and Paul, with relief decoration on coffering using classical motifs such as rosettes, leaves, heraldic emblems (a papal tiara and a bishop's mitre), as well as Celtic knotwork with grotesque faces. The decorations on the walls of the cathedral, including simulated inlaid polychrome marble, were made at the end of the 1950s by the decorator Enrico Lorrai of Cagliari (1908-1995). The floors have almost all been remade, firstly between 1950 and 1962 during the episcopate of Bishop Antonio Tedde and secondly between 1983 and 2003 during the episcopates of Bishops Gibertini and Orrù.

== Sources ==
- Naitza, Salvatore (1992). Architettura dal tardo '600 al classicismo purista. Cagliari: Ilisso. ISBN 88-85098-20-7.
