= Sinita =

Sinita may refer to:

- Titular see of Sinita, former Catholic diocese in Italy
- Sinitta Malone, British singer
