= Oristano Cathedral =

Church building in Oristano, Italy

Coordinates: 39°54′10″N 8°35′25″E

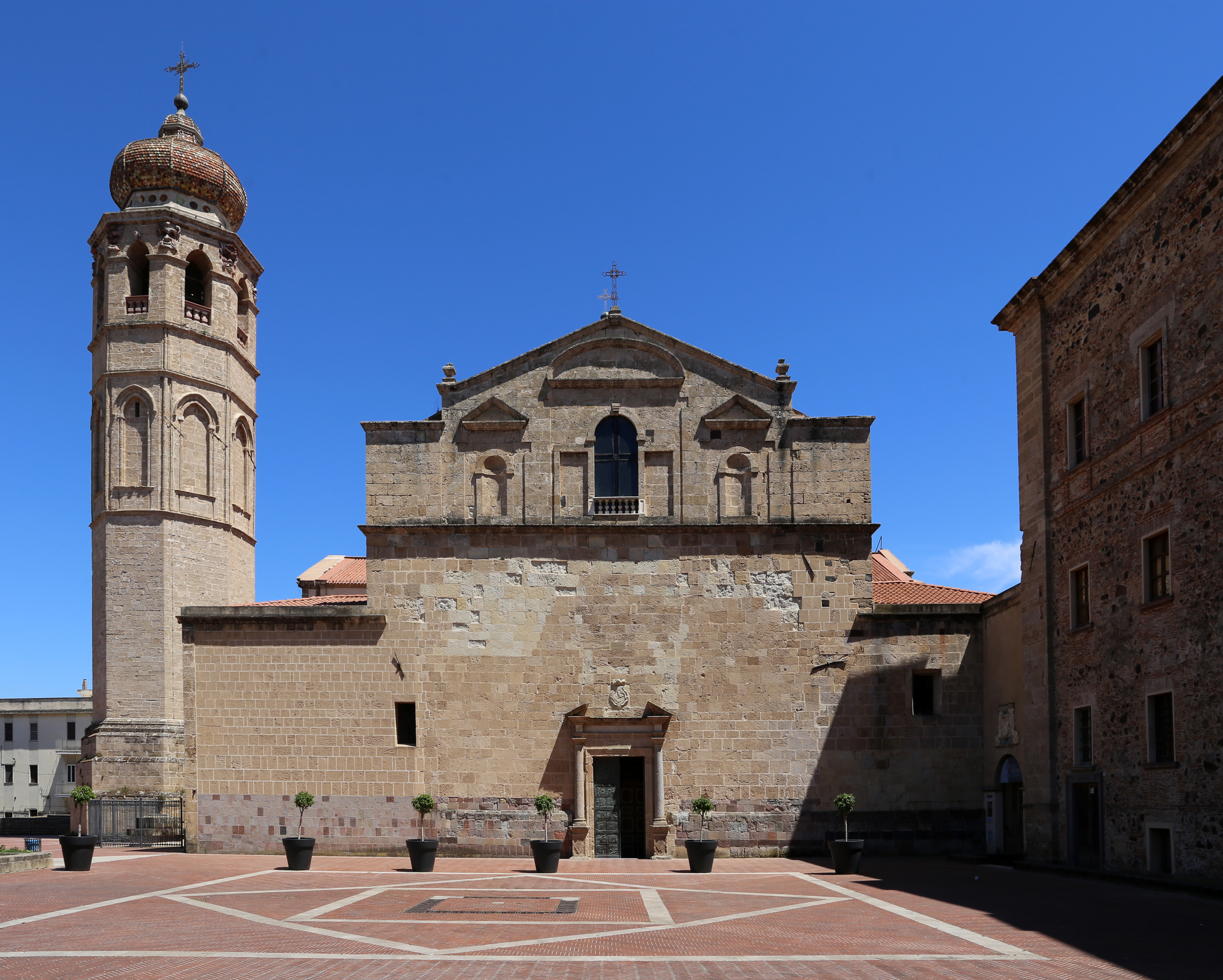
Oristano Cathedral west front

Oristano Cathedral (Italian: Duomo di Oristano; Cattedrale di Santa Maria Assunta), dedicated to the Assumption of the Virgin Mary, is the Roman Catholic cathedral of Oristano, Sardinia, Italy. It is the seat of the Archbishop of Oristano. It is built in the Baroque style, and is located in the historical centre of the city. It was initially constructed in 1195.

It is the largest Cathedral of Sardinia.

== Image gallery ==
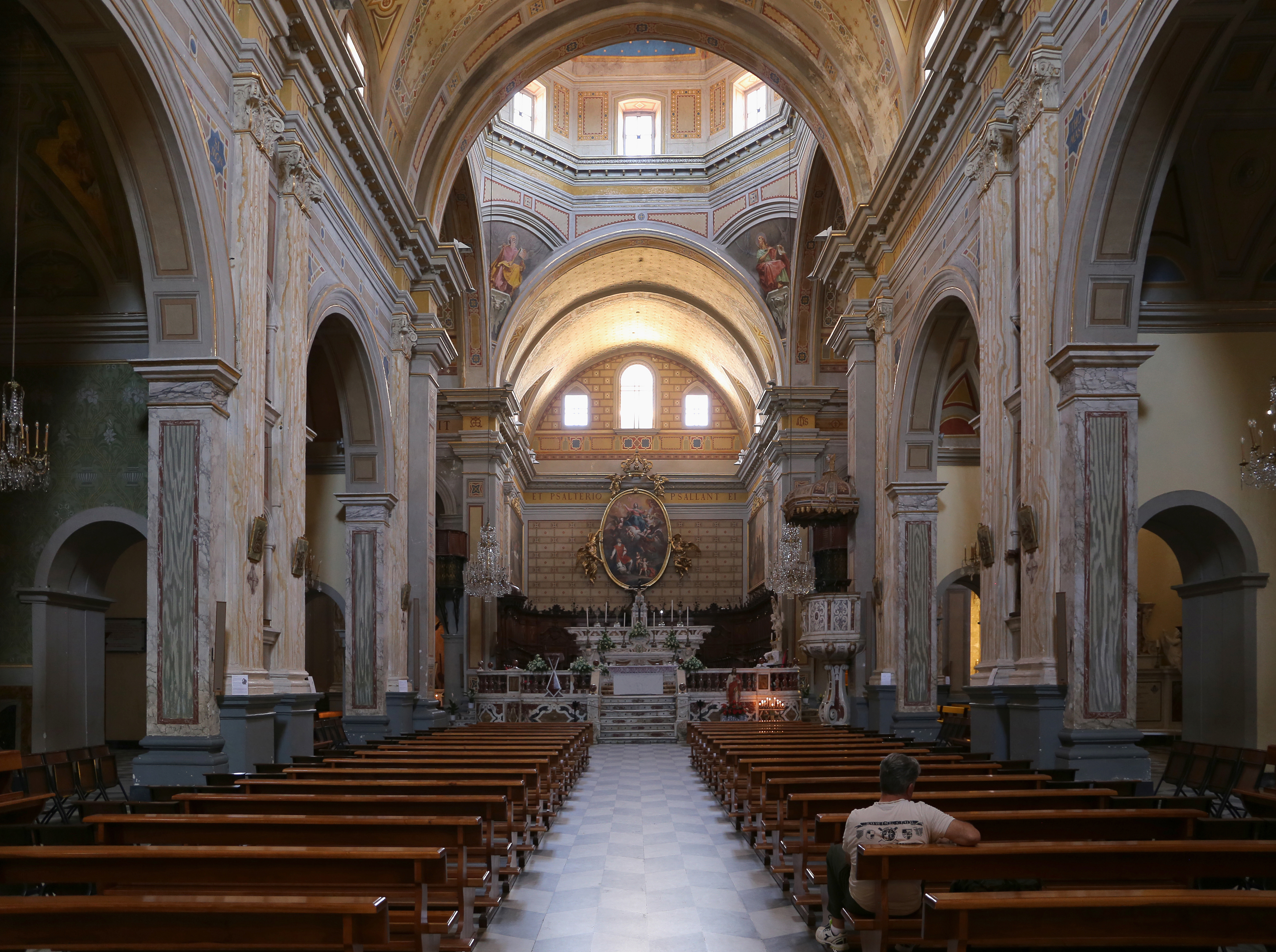
Interior

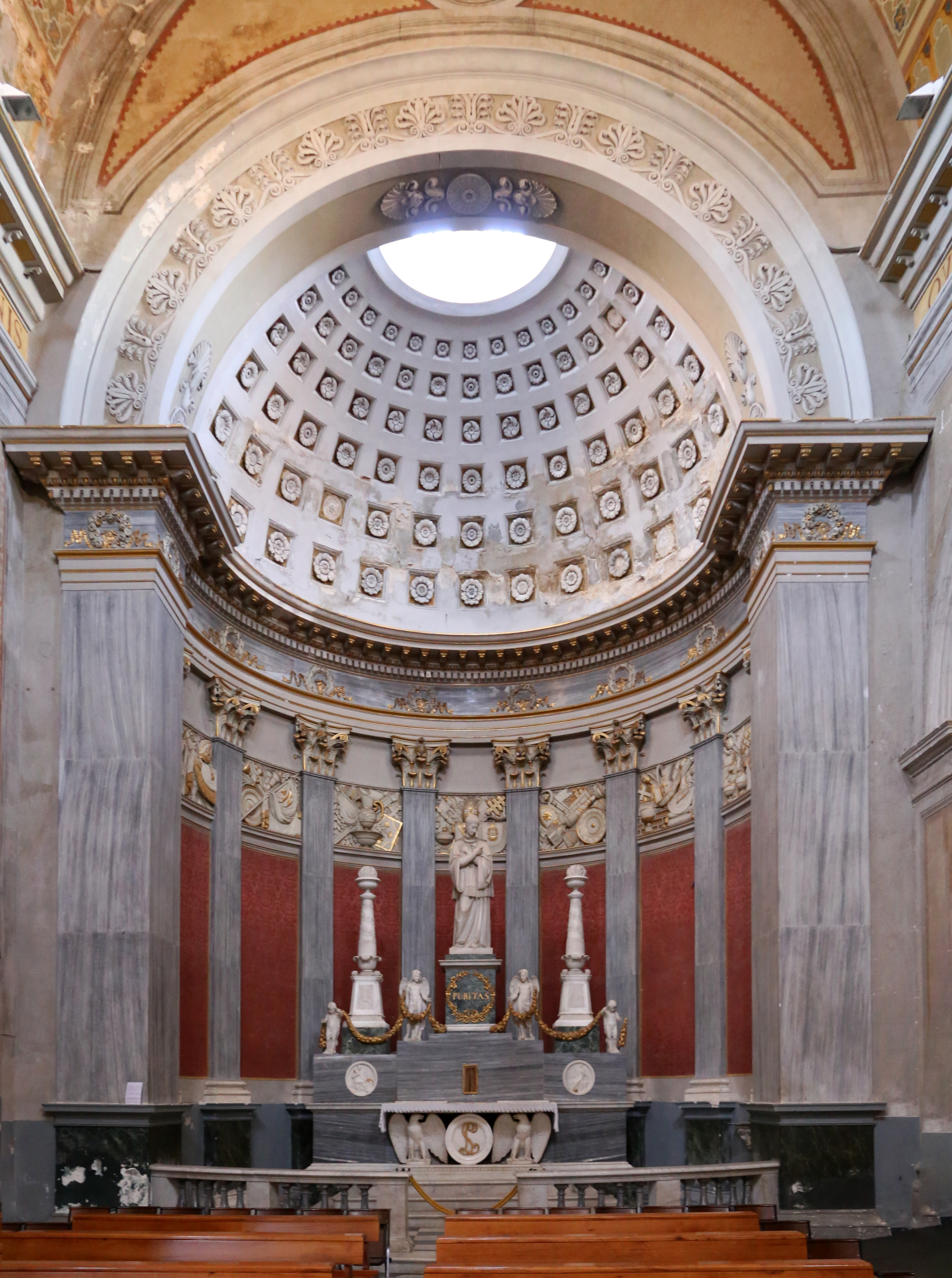
Altar of the transept

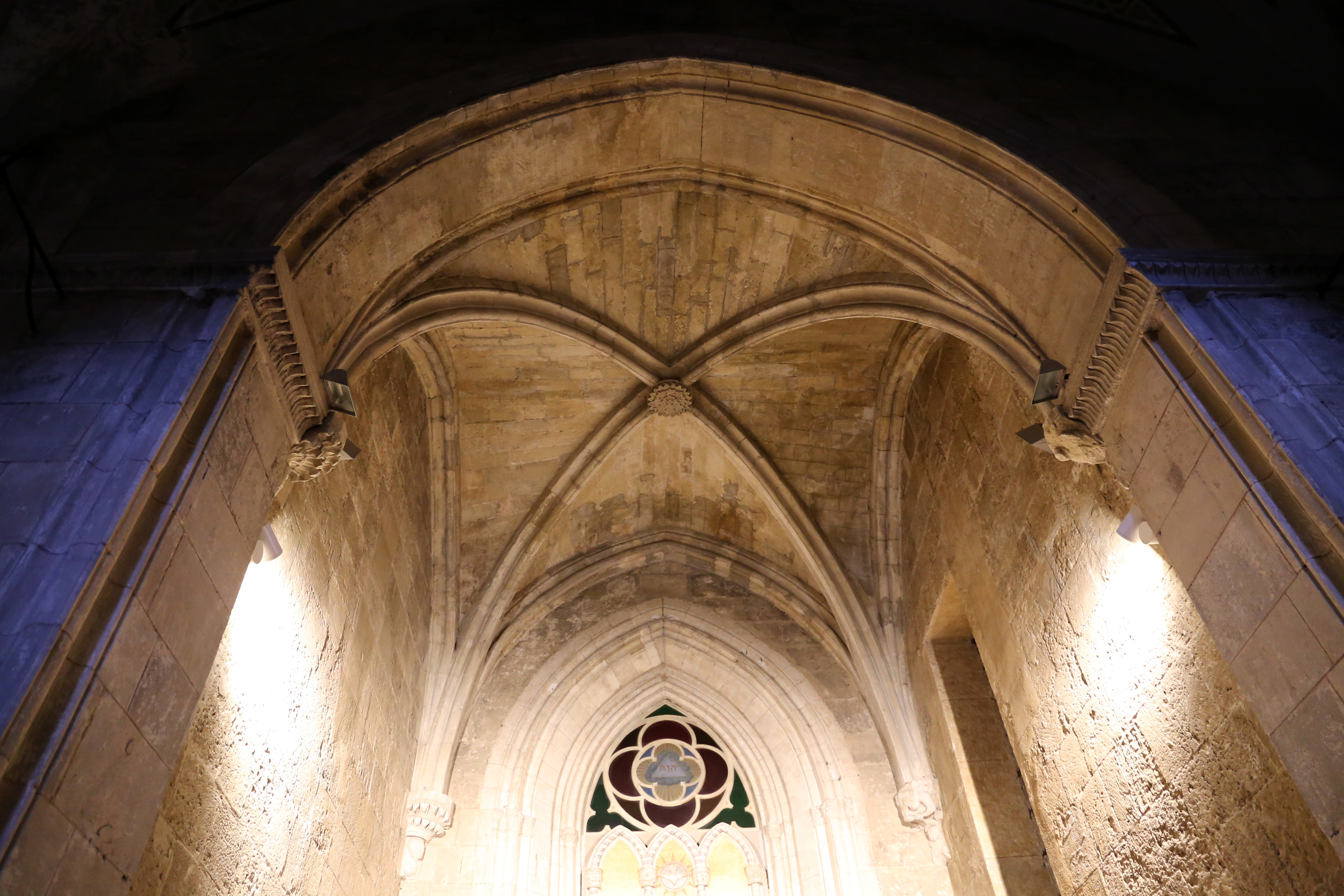
Chapel of the Beata Vergine del Rimedio

== See also ==
- 17th-century Western domes
