= Diocese of Santa Giusta =

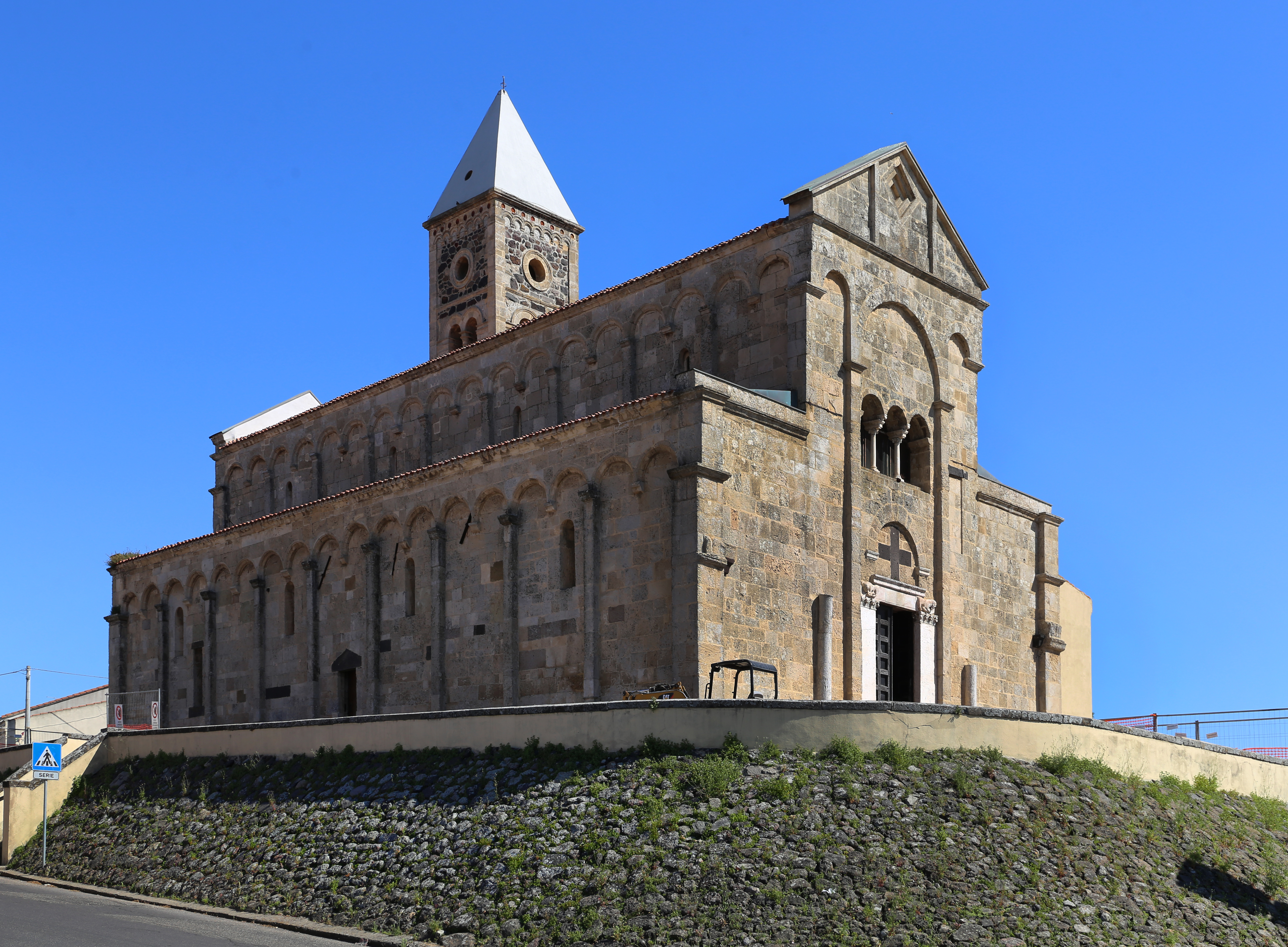
Cathedral of Santa Giusta

The Diocese of Santa Giusta, formerly Othoca, was a Roman Catholic diocese in Santa Giusta, Sardinia. The bishop's seat was in the former Santa Giusta Cathedral, now a minor basilica.

The diocese was established at an unknown date in the 11th century. Its earliest known bishop was Augustinus (1119). The diocese was suppressed in 1503, and its territory was assigned to the Archdiocese of Oristano (Arborea).

== History ==
On 13 November 1226, Gottifredo, Governor of the city of Rome and papal legate of Pope Honorius III in Corsica and Sardinia, held a national synod in Santa Giusta. A result was a collection of 27 canons.

The Archbishop of Pisa, Federico Visconti (1254–1277), in 1263 conducted a visitation of the island of Sardinia in his capacity of papal legate. When he arrived in Oristano, he received the bishop of Santa Giusta and the cathedral Chapter.

Archbishop Oddone Sala of Arborea (Oristano) held a provincial synod on 14 February 1309, in which Bishop Ioannes of Santa Giusta, Roberto of Terralba, and the archpriest of Usellus (on behalf of his bishop) participated.

Bishop Bernardus of Santa Giusta particioated in the first royal court of King Peter IV of Aragon (1336–1387) held in Sardinia, which took place in Cagliari on 10 March 1355.

The diocese was suppressed in 1503, and its territory was assigned to the Archdiocese of Oristano (Arborea). The abolition and transfer did not take effect immediately. Pope Leo X issued a bull on 15 July 1515, confirming the bull of Pope Julius II

Since 1969 Santa Giusta has been a titular bishopric.

== Bishops of Santa Giusta ==
...

- (c. 1119) : Augustinus
- (c. 1147-1160) : Paucapalea

...

- (c. 1164–1182) : Ugo
- (c. 1195) : Stephanus
- (c. 1206?) : Bonaccorso

...

- (c. 1228–1237) : Petrus de Martis

...

- (c. 1263–1268) : Mar[ - -]

...

- (c. 1291–1309) : Joannes
- (c. ? – 1318) : Fredericus, O.P.
- (c. 1318– ?) : Guilelmus
- (1330–c. ? ) : Petrus de Deo
- (c. 1340–1349) : Jacobus de Cucho, O.P.
- (1349– ? ) : Palaczinus, O.F.M.
- ( ? – ?) : Albertus
- (1354–1355) : Bernardus, O.Carm.
- (1355–1387?) : Leonardo de Zori
- (1387–1389) : Seraphinus Travaccio, O.F.M., Roman Obedience
- (1389 – ? ) : Joannes, Roman Obedience
- (1400–1401) : Geminianus, Roman Obedience
- (1401 – ? ) : Domenico, O.F.M., Roman Obedience
- (1428 – ? ) : Ettore Antonio, O.P.
- (1431–1433) : Antonio Manca, O.P.
- (1433–1467?) : Pietro de Villena, O.F.M.
- (1467– ? ) : Giovanni Garsia, O.Cist.
- (1477) : Simon
- (1477–1489?) : Francesco Amato
- (1489–1493) : Antonio Rodrigo
- (1494–c. 1512) : Gaspare di Torriglia

=== Titular bishops ===
- (1969–1971) : Juan Antonio del Val Gallo
- (1975–1978) : Hermenegildo Ramirez Sanchez, M.J.
- (1987–1998) : Giovanni Cheli
- (1998–pres) : Luigi Gatti

== See also ==
- Archdiocese of Oristano

== Sources ==
=== Reference Works ===
- Eubel, Conradus, ed. (1913). Hierarchia catholica (in Latin). Vol. 1 (Tomus 1) (second ed.). Münster: Libreria Regensbergiana. pp. 287–288.. Archived.
- Eubel, Conradus, ed. (1914). Hierarchia catholica (in Latin). Vol. 2 (Tomus 2) (second ed.). Münster: Libreria Regensbergiana. p. 169.. Archived.
- Eubel, Conradus, ed. (1923). Hierarchia catholica (in Latin). Vol. 3 (Tomus 3) (second ed.). Münster: Libreria Regensbergiana.. Archived.
- Gams, Pius Bonifatius (1873). Series episcoporum Ecclesiae catholicae: quotquot innotuerunt a beato Petro apostolo. Ratisbon: Typis et Sumptibus Georgii Josephi Manz. p. 83p. (Use with caution; obsolete)

=== Studies ===
- Bono, Raimondo (1971). II centro di Santa Giusta in Sardegna. (in Italian). Cagliari 1971.
- Cappelletti, Giuseppe (1857). Le chiese d'Italia dalla loro origine sino ai nostri giorni (in Italian). Vol. decimoterzo (13). Venezia: Antonelli. pp. 245–247..
- Coroneo, Roberto (ed.) (2010). La Cattedrale di Santa Giusta. Architettura e arredi dall'XI al XIX secolo. (in Italian). Cagliari: Scuola Sarda, 2010.
- Kehr, Paul Fridolin. (Ed. D. Girgensohn). Italia Pontificia (in Latin), Vol. X: Calabria – Insulae (Turici: Weidmann 1975). p. 455.
- Martini, Pietro (1841). Storia ecclesiastica di Sardegna. Volume 3 Cagliari: Stamperia Reale, 1841. (pp. 377-379).
- Mattei, Antonio Felice (1758). Sardinia sacra seu De episcopis Sardis historia nunc primò confecta a F. Antonio Felice Matthaejo. (in Latin). Romae: ex typographia Joannis Zempel apud Montem Jordanum, 1758. pp. 253-258.
- Zedda, Corrado; Pinna, Raimondo (2010). "La diocesi di Santa Giusta nel Medioevo," (in Italian), in: La Cattedrale di Santa Giusta. Architettura e arredi dall’XI al XIX secolo (Cagliari 2010), pp. 25–34.

==== External links ====
- Catholic Hierarchy: Titular See of Santa Giusta
- Catholic Hierarchy: Diocese of Santa Giusta (Othoca)
