= Pier Giuliano Tiddia =

Italian Roman Catholic archbishop (born 1929)

The Most Reverend Pier Giuliano Tiddia
- Archbishop Emeritus of Oristano
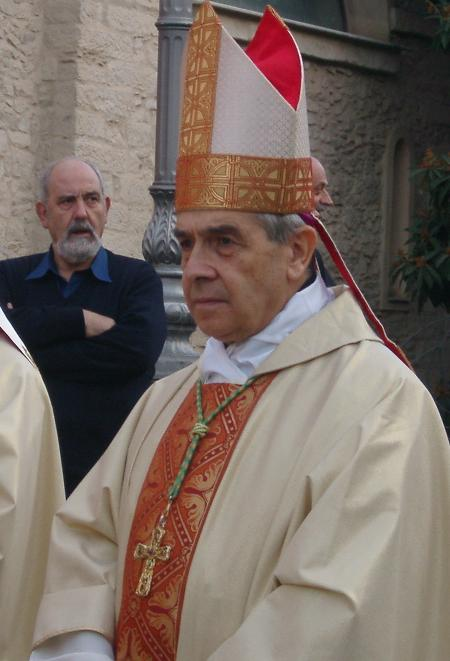
- Church: Catholic Church
- Archdiocese: Oristano
- Appointed: 30 November 1985
- Term ended: 22 April 2006
- Predecessor: Francesco Spanedda
- Successor: Ignazio Sanna

Orders
- Ordination: 16 December 1951
- Consecration: 2 February 1975 by Sebastiano Baggio

Personal details
- Born: Pier Giuliano Tiddia; 13 June 1929 (age 96) Cagliari, Kingdom of Italy
- Motto: Servi sumus Eius Ecclesiae

Pier Giuliano Tiddia (born 13 June 1929) is an Italian Roman Catholic prelate, who served as Archbishop of Oristano from 1985 until his retirement in 2006.

== Early life and priesthood ==
Tiddia was born in Cagliari, Sardinia, on 13 June 1929. He was ordained a priest for the Archdiocese of Cagliari on 16 December 1951.

He pursued advanced studies in canon law in Rome, earning a doctorate, and later held several diocesan offices, including seminary rector (1966–1971) and vicar general.

== Episcopate ==
On 24 December 1974, Pope Paul VI appointed Tiddia titular bishop of Minturno and auxiliary bishop of Cagliari. He received episcopal consecration on 2 February 1975 from Sebastiano Cardinal Baggio.

On 30 November 1985, Pope John Paul II named him Archbishop of Oristano. During his tenure, he carried out extensive pastoral visitation, ordained priests, and oversaw diocesan initiatives throughout Sardinia.

Tiddia retired on 22 April 2006, in accordance with canon law, and was succeeded by Ignazio Sanna. After retirement, he continued to assist in pastoral and liturgical activities.

== Later life ==
In 2019, Tiddia celebrated his 90th birthday, marking more than six decades of priestly ministry and over fifty years as a bishop of the Catholic Church.
