= Ales, Sardinia =

Ales Abas
- Comune
- Comune di Ales
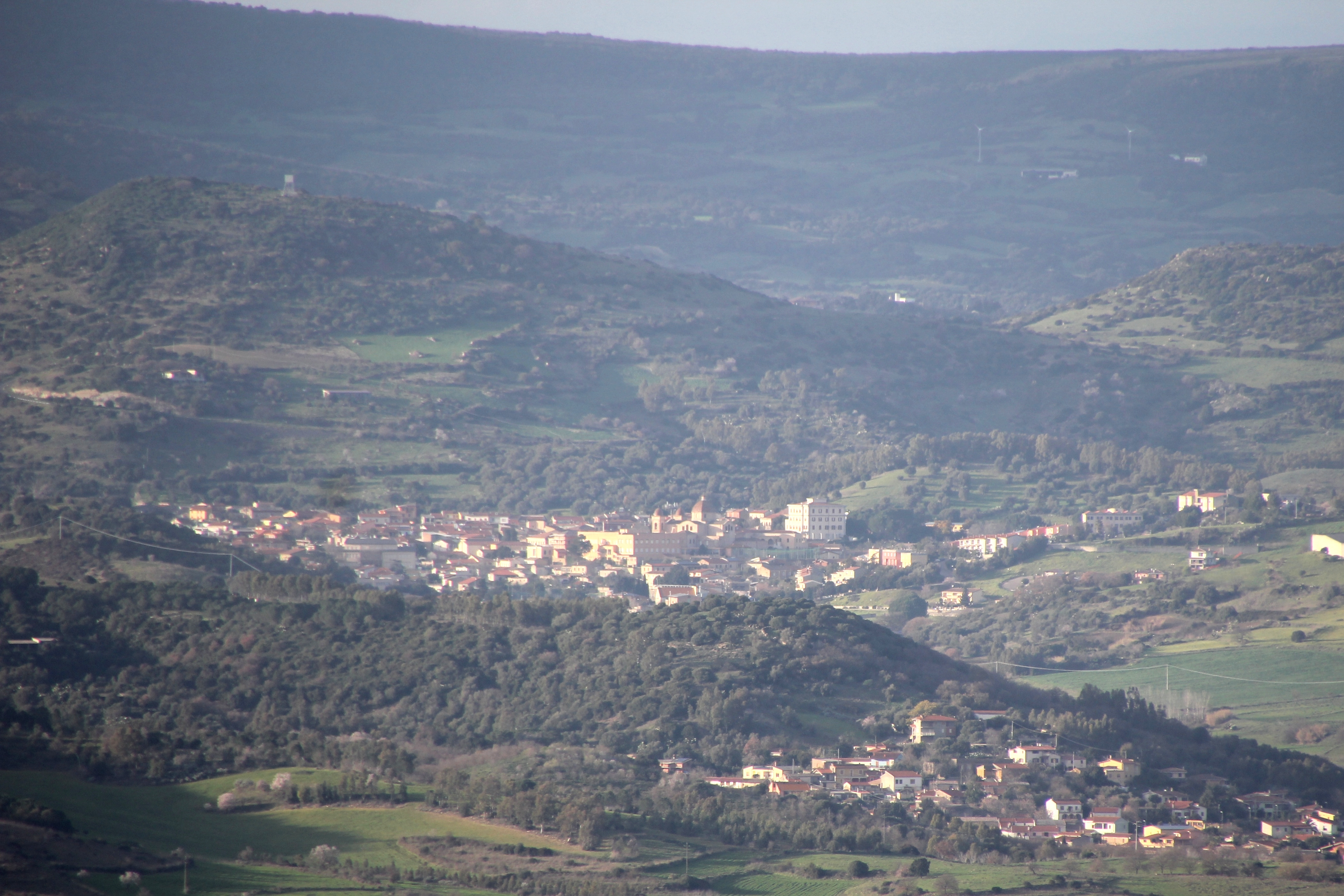

- Location within Sardinia
- Coordinates: 39°46′N 8°49′E
- Country: Italy
- Region: Sardinia
- Province: Oristano
- Frazioni: Zeppara

Government
  - Mayor: Francesco Mereu

Area
  - Total: 22.45 km^{2} (8.67 sq mi)
- Elevation: 194 m (636 ft)

Population (2026)
  - Total: 1,229
  - Density: 54.74/km^{2} (141.8/sq mi)
- Demonyms: Aleresi; Abaresus
- Time zone: UTC+1 (CET)
  - Summer (DST): UTC+2 (CEST)
- Postal code: 09091
- Dialing code: 0783
- Patron saint: Sts. Peter and Paul
- Saint day: 29 June
- Website: Official website

Ales (Sardinian: Abas) is a town and comune (municipality) in the Province of Oristano in the autonomous region of Sardinia in Italy. It lies on the eastern slopes of Mount Arci. It has a population of 1,229.

This area is the only Sardinian source of obsidian.

== Demographics ==
As of 2026, the population is 1,229, of which 50.9% are male, and 49.1% are female. Minors make up 8.4% of the population, and seniors make up 35.2%.

Historical population

Year	Pop.	±%
1861	1,409	—
1871	1,537	+9.1%
1881	1,338	−12.9%
1901	1,465	+9.5%
1911	1,607	+9.7%
1921	1,619	+0.7%
1931	1,829	+13.0%
1936	1,874	+2.5%

Year	Pop.	±%
1951	2,305	+23.0%
1961	2,152	−6.6%
1971	1,844	−14.3%
1981	1,807	−2.0%
1991	1,691	−6.4%
2001	1,628	−3.7%
2011	1,515	−6.9%
2021	1,293	−14.7%

Source: ISTAT

=== Immigration ===
As of 2025, of the known countries of birth of 1,242 residents, the most numerous are: Italy (1,216 – 97.9%), Germany (8 – 0.6%).

== Religion ==
Together with the town of Terralba, Ales forms the Roman Catholic diocese of Ales-Terralba. The cathedral of Ales, dedicated to Saint Peter, is the bishop's seat. Its current bishop, since 10 February 2016, is Roberto Carboni, O.F.M. Conv.

== Notable people ==
Antonio Gramsci and Fernando Atzori were born in Ales. The nearest international airport is in Cagliari, at roughly 70 kilometres (43 mi) distance.

== See also ==
- Diocese of Ales-Terralba
