= Justa, Justina and Henedina =

Religious Martyrs

Saints Justa, Justina and Henedina (or Aenidina) of Cagliari (Sardinian: Justa, Justina et Enedina, Italian: Giusta, Giustina ed Enedina) (died 130) were Christian martyrs (possibly sisters) of Sardinia, put to death at Cagliari or possibly Sassari.

Their feast day is 14 May.

The town of Santa Giusta in Sardinia is named after Justa, and the cathedral is dedicated to her.

== Sources ==
- Saints and Angels: St. Justa
- Saints.spqn: Justa, Justina and Henedina
