= Cabras, Sardinia =

Cabras Crabas
- Comune
- Comune di Cabras
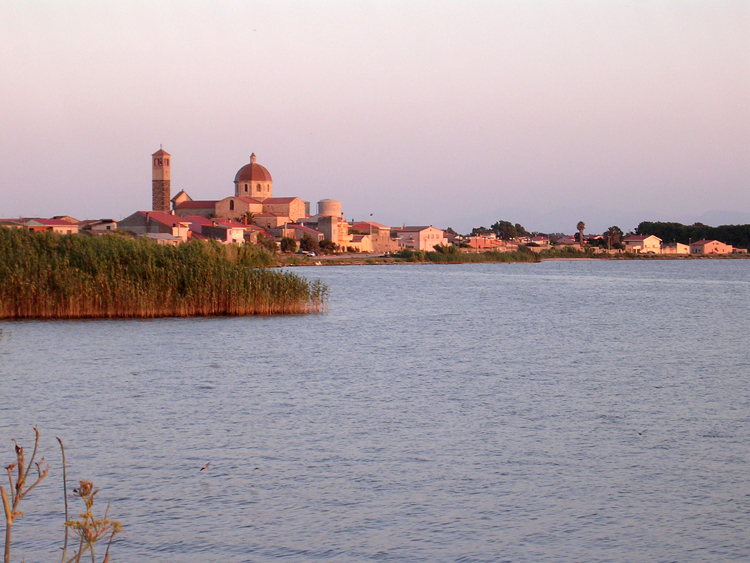
- View of Cabras from the pond

- Coat of arms

- Location within Sardinia
- Coordinates: 39°56′N 8°32′E
- Country: Italy
- Region: Sardinia
- Province: Oristano (OR)
- Frazioni: Funtana Meiga, Il Catalano, Isola Mal di Ventre, San Giovanni di Sinis, San Salvatore di Sinis, Solanas, Su Cungiau de Gerrusso, Porto Suedda

Government
  - Mayor: Andrea Abis

Area
  - Total: 102.26 km^{2} (39.48 sq mi)
- Elevation: 6 m (20 ft)

Population (30 April 2017)
  - Total: 9,165
  - Density: 89.62/km^{2} (232.1/sq mi)
- Demonym(s): Cabraresi; Crabarissus
- Time zone: UTC+1 (CET)
  - Summer (DST): UTC+2 (CEST)
- Postal code: 09072
- Dialing code: 0783
- Patron saint: St. Mary
- Saint day: 24 May
- Website: Official website

Cabras (Sardinian: Crabas) is a comune (municipality) in the Province of Oristano in the Italian region of Sardinia, located about 90 kilometres (56 mi) northwest of Cagliari and about 6 kilometres (4 mi) northwest of Oristano.

Cabras borders the following municipalities: Nurachi, Oristano, Riola Sardo. It is home to several churches - a parish church, in the Baroque style, and a Church of the Holy Spirit, dating to 1601 with two Gothic aisles. It is also home to the Phoenician archaeological site of Tharros.

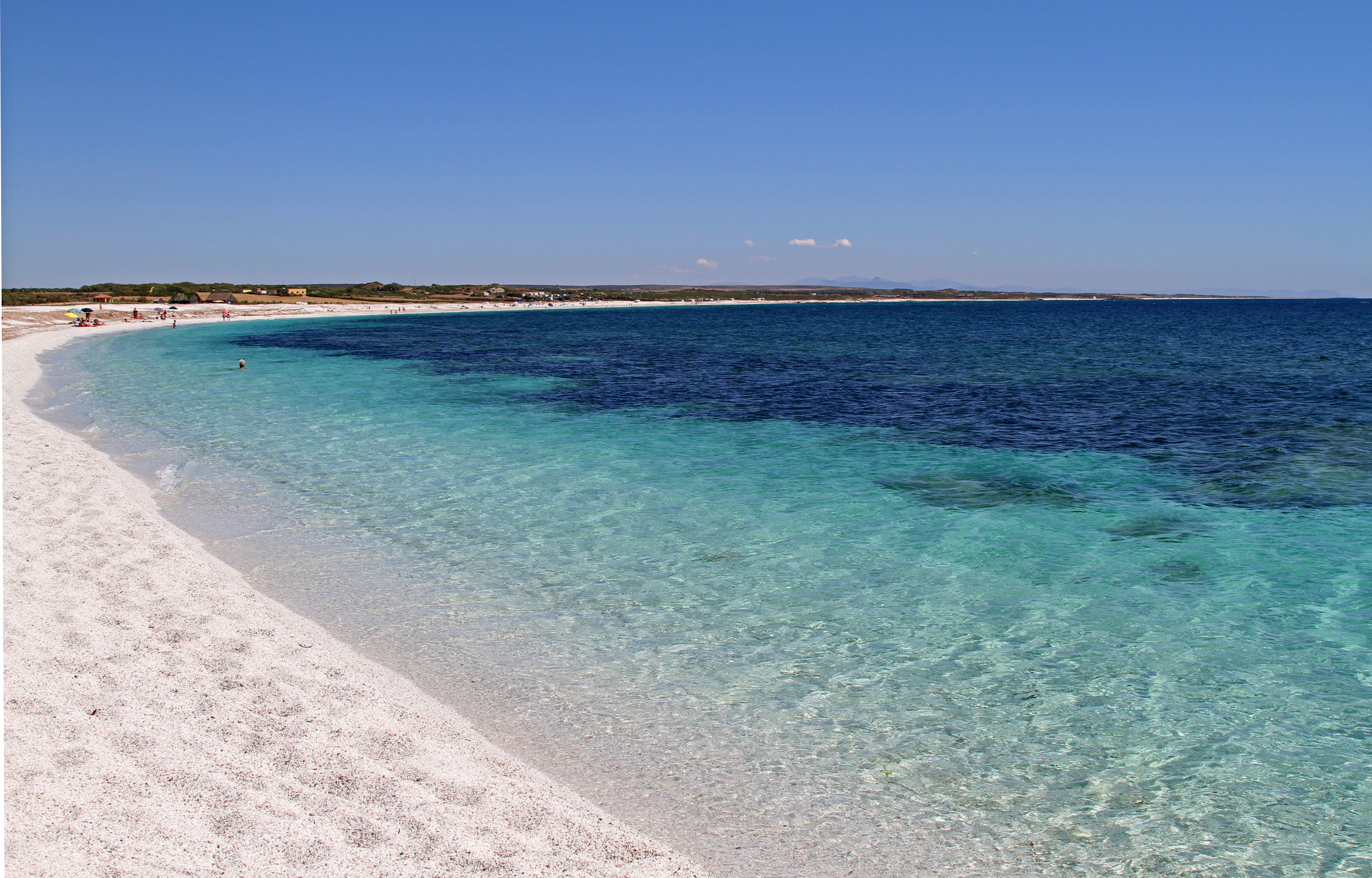
Mari Ermi beach

The municipal territory includes several beaches in the Sinis peninsula and on the Gulf of Oristano.

== History ==
In this territory, the famous Giants of Monte Prama were discovered in the 70s. These Nuragic statues date back to the early Iron Age and are now displayed at the local archaeological museum.

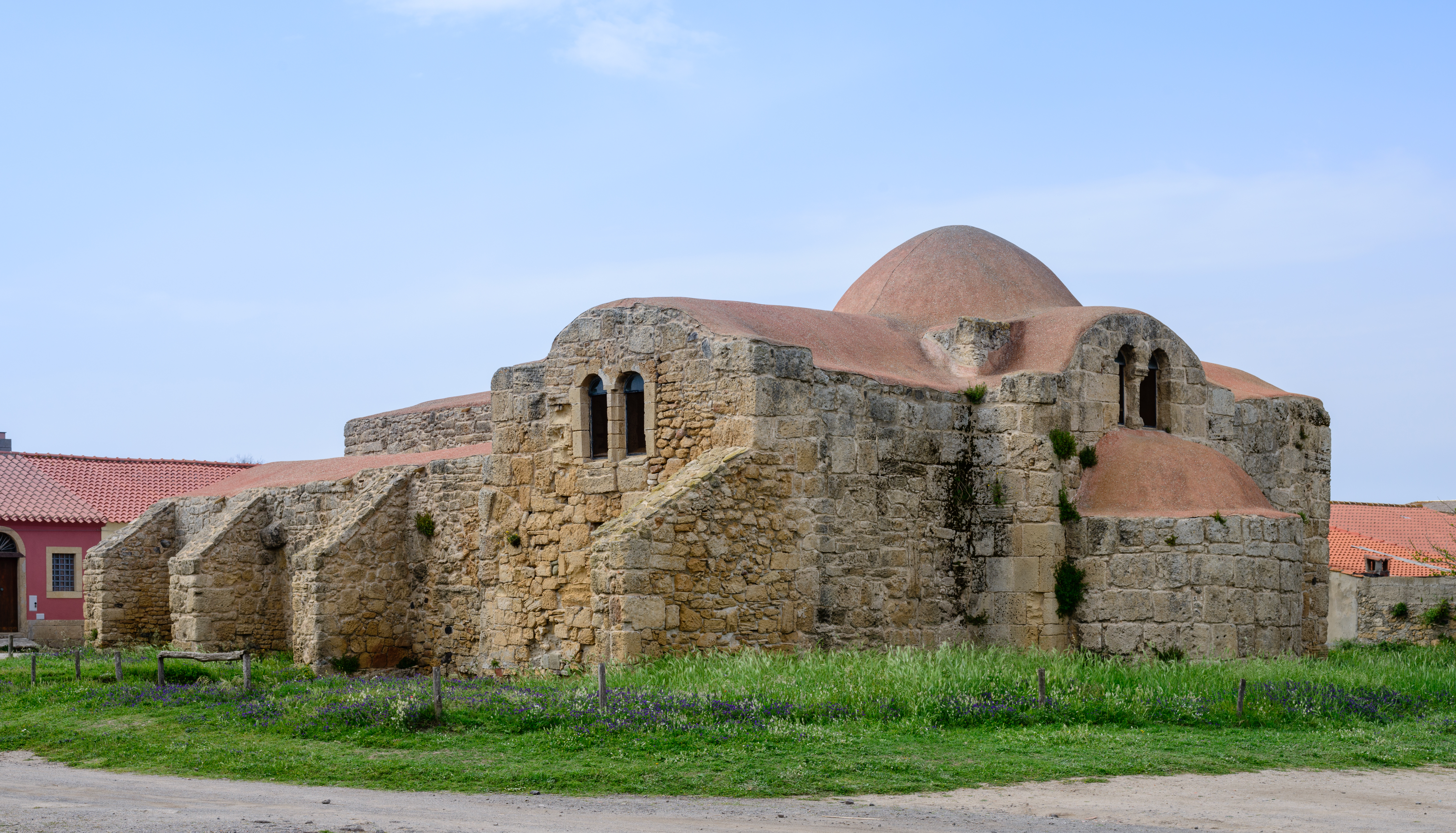
Byzantine church of San Giovanni di Sinis

Cabras appeared in the 11th century, when the town of Tharros was abandoned due to raids from North African pirates. The inhabitants first settled near the castle, scant remains of which can be seen near the parish church.

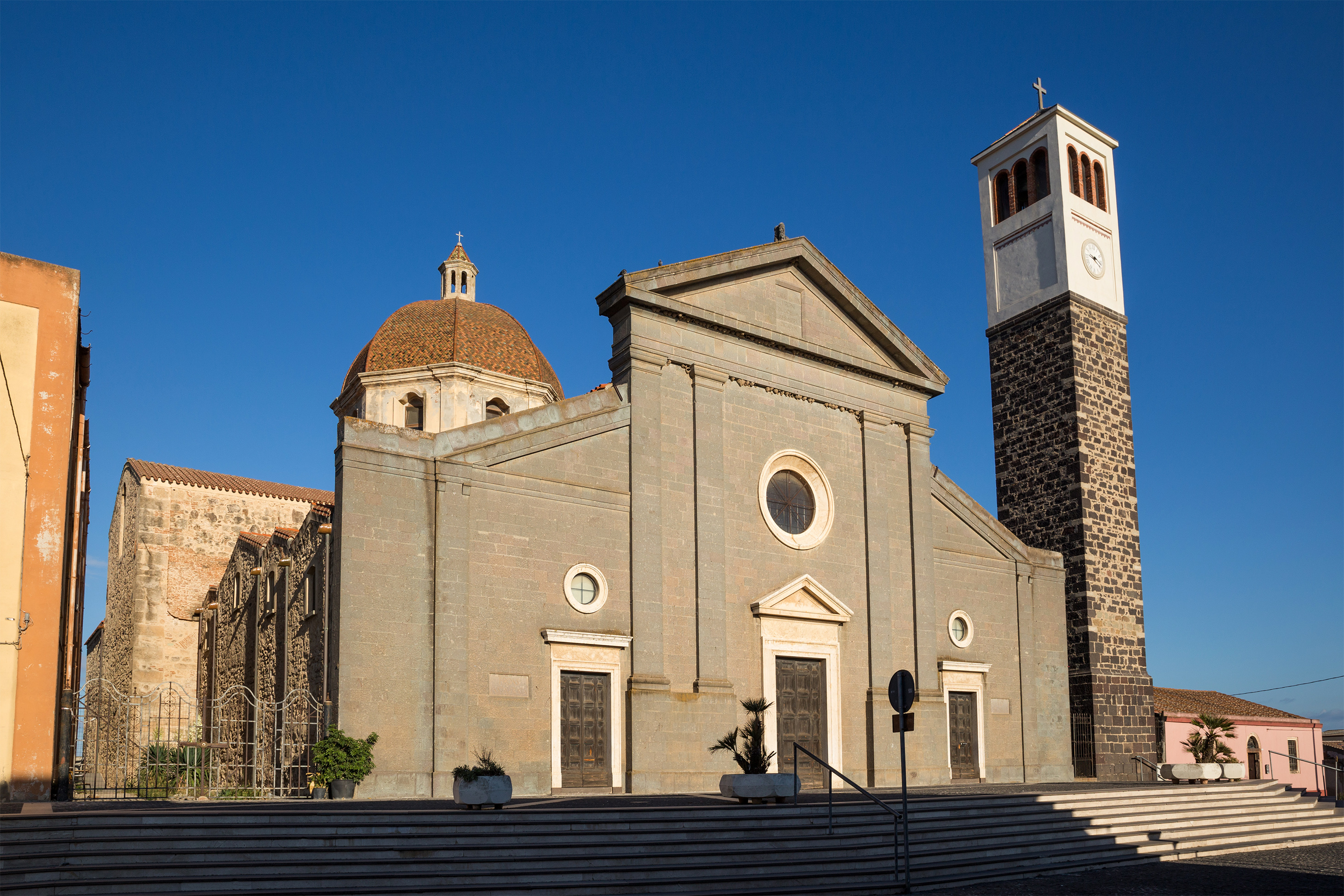
Santa Maria Assunta

Under the Giudicato of Arborea it had some importance as the court of the giudice (duke) was held in its castle. After the fall of the giudicato, it was ruled by several feudal lords. In the 19th century it was included in the province of Oristano, until being annexed in 1859 to the province of Cagliari. Cabras returned to Oristano in 1974.
