= Diocese of Ales-Terralba =

Roman Catholic diocese in Italy

Coordinates: 39.7667°N 8.8167°E

Diocese of Ales-Terralba Dioecesis Uxellensis-Terralbensis

Catholic
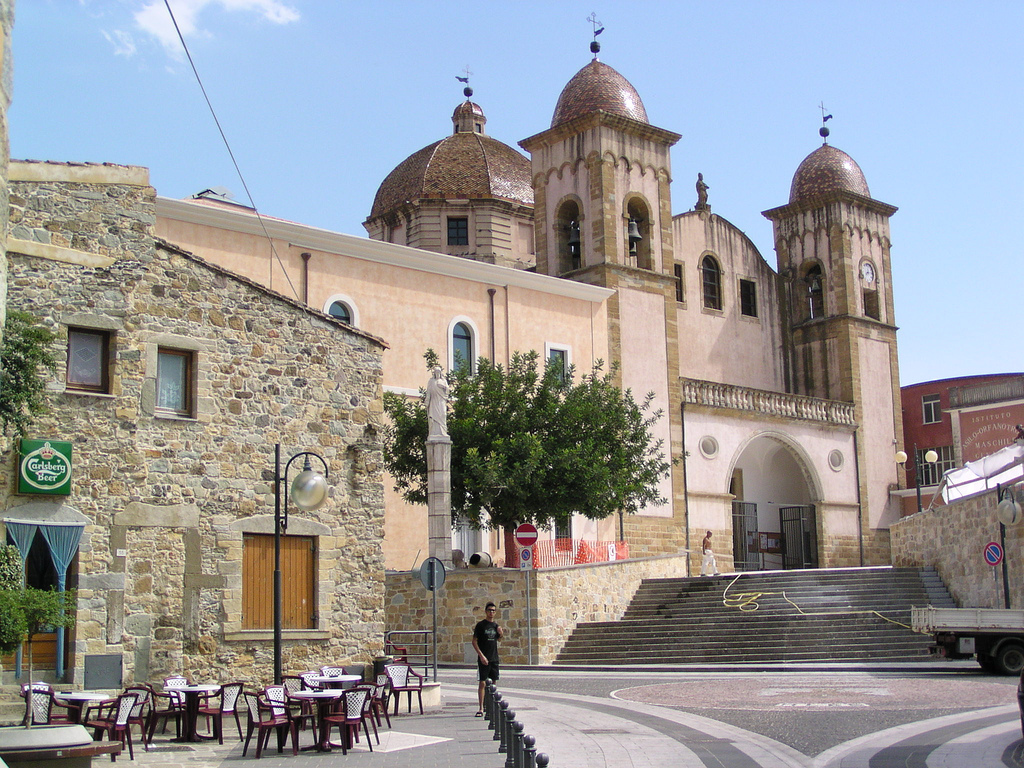
- Ales Cathedral

Location
- Country: Italy
- Ecclesiastical province: Oristano
- Metropolitan: Archdiocese of Oristano

Statistics
- Area: 1,494 km^{2} (577 sq mi)
- Population: Total; Catholics: (as of 2023); 88,868 ▼; 88,413 ▼
- Parishes: 57

Information
- Denomination: Catholic Church
- Rite: Roman Rite
- Cathedral: Cattedrale di Ss. Pietro e Paolo (Ales)
- Co-cathedral: Concattedrale di S. Pietro Apostolo (Terralba)
- Secular priests: 57 (diocesan) ▼7 (Religious Orders); 5 Permanent Deacons

Current leadership
- Pope: Leo XIV
- Bishop: Roberto Carboni, O.F.M. Conv.
- Bishops emeritus: Giovanni Dettori

Website
- www.diocesialesterralba.va.it Diocesan web site (in Italian)

The Diocese of Ales-Terralba (Latin: Dioecesis Uxellensis-Terralbensis) is a Latin diocese of the Catholic Church located in west-central Sardinia. It is a suffragan of the Archdiocese of Oristano (Arborea). Ales lies at a distance of 31 km from Oristano in a direct line.

== History ==
It is claimed that Pope Gregory I (590–604) alludes to the episcopal see of Ales (anciently Uselli), in his letter to Januarius of Cagliari in 591. This assertion is now rejected.

After this there is no reference to a diocese of Ales until 1147, when the name of Bishop Maurellu appears in a diploma. The manuscript actually reads: Pelius Episcopus Dusselieanas.

When the seat of the bishop was still in Usellus, the church of SS Giusta, Giustina and Enedina When the seat moved to Ales, eight km to the southwest, the church of S. Pietro became the cathedral. The cathedral was served and administered by a corporation called the Chapter, consisting of a Dean and eighteen Canons.

The climate of Ales and Usellus was so inhospitable that the bishops would spend the summer and autumn in Cagliari.

The diocese of Terralba has no memory of bishops before the 12th century. The local traditions of Terralba record a Bishop Mariano, who erected the cathedral about 1144. The diocese occurs in the Liber Censuum of the late 12th century.

=== Union of dioceses ===
In the second half of the 15th century, several dioceses on the island of Sardinia were in difficulties due to financial shortages, as well as the movements of peoples. After extensive consultations had taken place between King Ferdinand of Aragon and Sardinia, Isabella I of Castile, and Pope Alexander VI, and after discussions with members of the College of Cardinals (including Cardinal Giuliano della Rovere) and other interested parties, plans were advanced to consolidate the troubled dioceses. Alexander VI died, however, before the decisions were announced or implemented. After additional consultations, Pope Julius II, on 8 December 1503, in the bull "Aequum Reputamus," united the diocese of Ales and Terralba.

Pope Clement VII granted the Emperor Charles V the privilege of nominating candiddates to vacant archbishoprics, bishoprics and cardinalatial monasteries in the kingdom of Sardinia in 1533. The grant was for the emperor's lifetime. Pope Sixtus V renewed the grant to Charles' son, King Philip II of Spain in 1586. Pope Paul V granted it to King Philip III of Spain and his successors in 1609.

Bishop Francesco Masones y Nin (1693–1704) conducted a diocesan synod in 1696.

==== Populations ====
The population of Ales in 1692 was around 1,000 persons. In 1761, it was reckoned at around 2,000. In 1820, the village of Ales had a population of 749, and the village of Terralba a population of 3,040. In 1920, there were reported to be 59,530 Catholics in the entire diocese, organized into 42 parishes. In 2017, the inhabitants of Ales were numbered at 1,410 by the National Institute of Statistics; the comune of Terralba had a population of 10,201.

=== Contemporary arrangement ===
The Bishop of Ales-Terralba, Roberto Carboni, O.F.M. Conv., was promoted on 4 May 2019 to be Archbishop of Oristano and on the same date was appointed Apostolic Administrator of his former diocese of Ales-Terralba. However, on 3 July 2021, without losing his position as Archbishop of Oristano, he was reappointed Bishop of Ales-Terralba. The announcement specifies that this act unifies the two dioceses in persona Episcopi ('in the person of the Bishop').

== Bishops ==
=== Diocese of Ales ===
...

- (c. 1147) : Maurellu
- (c. 1182) : Comita Pais

...

- (c. 1234–1237) : Joannes Marras
- (c. 1312–1320) : Robertus Drago, O.P.
- ( ? – ? ) : Joannes
- (1330–1367) : Joannes de Vieri
- (1367–1373) : Jacobus
- (c. 1396) : Christophorus, Roman Obedience
- ( ? – ? ) : Gometius, Roman Obedience
- (1396–1402) : Antonius, Roman Obedience
- (1402–1403) : Jacobus, Roman Obedience
- (1412–1413) : Petrus, Avignon Obedience
- (1413–1418) : Petrus Spinola, O.S.B., Pisan Obedience
- (1418–1421) : Bernardus Rubei, O.F.M.
- (1421–1425) : Joannes de Campo(longo), O.Carm.
- (1425–1439) : Jacobus de Villanova, O.F.M.
- (1439–1444) : Joannes Garsiae, O.P.
- (1444–1454) : Bernardus Michaelis, O.P.
- (1454–1463) : Antonius de Bich
- (1463–1484) : Joannes de la Bona
- (1484–1490) : Pedro Garcia
- (1493–1506) : Juan Crespo, O.S.A.

=== Diocese of Terralba ===
- (c. 1144) : Marianus
- (c. 1146) : Ildebrandinus
- (c. 1182–1206) Marianus Zorrachi
- (c. 1210–1224) : Torgodorius de Muro
- (c. 1228–1248) : Guantinus de Scuro
- (c. 1299/1300) : Furatus
- (1300–1302) : Oddo Sala, O.P.
- (1302–1329) : Robertus Vacca, O.Min.
- (1329–1332) : Martinus, O.E.S.A.
- (1332–1356) : Joannes Rubei, O.Carm.
- (1356–1364) : Guglielmo d'Aragona
- (1364–1389) : Joannes

(1378– ? ) : Francesco Passarino, Roman Obedience
(c. 1386) : Fennis, Roman Obedience
(1409–1411?) Francesco, Roman Obedience
(1411–1412) : Francesco di Roma, O.E.S.A.,
Pisan-Roman Obedience

- (1389–1412) : Pietro Ferrari, O.F.M., Avignon Obedience
- (1412–1419) : Guglielmo, Avignon Obedience
- (1419–1425) : Matteo Serra, O.P.
- (1425–1436) : Dominicus Joannis, O.P.
- (1436–1443) : Jacobus Fortesa
- (1443–1444) : Joannes de Aranda, O.E.S.A.
- (1475–1484) : Joannes Pellis
- (1484–1503) : Joannes Orient, O.F.M.

(1503–1507) : Sede vacante

=== Diocese of Ales e Terralba ===
Diocese of Ales united with Diocese of Terralba: 8 December 1503

==== From 1507 to 1704 ====
- (1507–1521) : Joannes Sanna
- (1521–1557) : Andrea Sanna
- (1557–1562) : Gerardus de Doni
- (1562–1566) : Pedro del Frago Garcés
- (1568–1584) : Miguel Maigues, O.S.A.
- (1585–1601) : Pedro Clement, O. Carm.
- (1601–1605) : Antonio Surredu
- (1606–1613) : Lorenzo Nieto y Corrales Montero Nieto, O.S.B.
- (1613–1616) : Diego de Borja, O.F.M.Observ.
- (1616–1634) : Gavino Manconi
- (1635–1638) : Melchiorre Pirella
- (1644–1662) : Antonio Manunta (18 Apr 1644 – Oct 1662)
- (1663–1679) : Giovanni Battista Brunengo
- (1680–1681) : Serafino Esquirro
- (1684–1693) : Domenico Cugia
- (1693–1704) : Francesco Masones y Nin

==== From 1704 to present ====
- (1704–1724) : Isidoro Masones y Nin
- (1727–1728) : Salvatore Ruyu
- (1728–1736) : Giovanni Battista Sanna
- (1736–1760) : Antonio Giuseppe Carcassona
- (1761–1786) : Giuseppe Maria Pilo, O. Carm.
- (1788–1806) : Michele Antonio Aymerich de Villamar
- (1819–1822) : Giuseppe Stanislao Paradiso
- (1828–1837) : Antonio Raimondo Tore
- (1842–1866) : Pietro Vargiù (22 Jul 1842 – 3 Aug 1866)
- (1867–1893) : Francesco Zunnui Casula
- (1893–1906) :Palmerio Garau (12 Jun 1893 – 27 Mar 1906)

(1906–1910) : Sede vacante

- (1910–1947) : Francesco Emanuelli
- (1948–1982) : Antonio Tedde (5 Feb 1948 – 6 Aug 1982)
- (1983–1989) : Giovanni Paolo Gibertini, O.S.B.
- (1990–2004) : Antonino Orrù (9 Apr 1990 – 5 Feb 2004 Retired)
- (2004–2016) : Giovanni Dettori (5 Feb 2004 – 10 Feb 2016 Retired)
- (2016–pres) : Roberto Carboni, O.F.M. Conv.

== Sources ==
=== Reference Works ===
- Eubel, Conradus, ed. (1913). Hierarchia catholica (in Latin). Vol. 1 (Tomus 1) (second ed.). Münster: Libreria Regensbergiana. p. 510.. Archived.
- Eubel, Conradus, ed. (1914). Hierarchia catholica (in Latin). Vol. 2 (Tomus 2) (second ed.). Münster: Libreria Regensbergiana. p. 261.. Archived.
- Eubel, Conradus, ed. (1923). Hierarchia catholica (in Latin). Vol. 3 (Tomus 3) (second ed.). Münster: Libreria Regensbergiana. p. 324.. Archived.
- Gams, Pius Bonifatius (1873). Series episcoporum Ecclesiae catholicae: quotquot innotuerunt a beato Petro apostolo. Ratisbon: Typis et Sumptibus Georgii Josephi Manz. pp. 831–832. (Use with caution; obsolete)
- Gauchat, Patritius (Patrice) (1935). Hierarchia catholica (in Latin). Vol. IV (1592-1667). Münster: Libraria Regensbergiana. p. 355.
- Ritzler, Remigius; Sefrin, Pirminus (1952). Hierarchia catholica medii et recentis aevi (in Latin). Vol. V (1667-1730). Patavii: Messagero di S. Antonio. p. 401.
- Ritzler, Remigius; Sefrin, Pirminus (1958). Hierarchia catholica medii et recentis aevi (in Latin). Vol. 6 (1730-1799). Patavii: Messagero di S. Antonio. pp. 428–429.
- Ritzler, Remigius; Sefrin, Pirminus (1968). Hierarchia Catholica medii et recentioris aevi (in Latin). Vol. 7 (1800–1846). Monasterii: Libr. Regensburgiana.
- Ritzler, Remigius; Sefrin, Pirminus (1978). Hierarchia catholica Medii et recentioris aevi (in Latin). Vol. 8 (1846–1903). Il Messaggero di S. Antonio.
- Pięta, Zenon (2002). Hierarchia catholica medii et recentioris aevi (in Latin). Vol. 9 (1903–1922). Padua: Messagero di San Antonio. ISBN 978-88-250-1000-8.

=== Studies ===
- Buonaiutti, Ernesto (1907). "Ales and Terralba, Diocese of," in: The Catholic Encyclopedia Volume 1. NY: The Universal Knowledge Foundation. 1907. P. 283. Supplement I (1922), p. 26.
- Cappelletti, Giuseppe (1857). Le chiese d'Italia dalla loro origine sino ai nostri giorni (in Italian). Vol. decimoterzo (13). Venezia: Antonelli. pp. 250–265..
- Cossu, Pietro Maria (1945). Fasti e fasi della Diocesi di Usellus: note storico-critiche. Oristano: Scuola Tipografica Arborea 1945.
- Ibba, Roberto (2011). "I monti granatici in Sardegna: l’esperienza della diocesi di Ales-Terralba,” (in Italian) in: Rivista di storia dell' agricoltura, vol. 51 (Firenze: Accademia dei Georgofili 2011), pp. 45–100
- Kehr, Paul Fridolin. Italia Pontificia (in Latin), Vol. X: Calabria – Insulae (Turici: Weidmann 1975). pp. 457–458.
- Martini, Pietro (1841). Storia ecclesiastica di Sardegna. Volume 3 Cagliari: Stamperia Reale, 1841. (pp. 315-379).
- Mattei, Antonio Felice (1758). Sardinia sacra seu De episcopis Sardis historia nunc primò confecta a F. Antonio Felice Matthaejo. (in Latin). Romae: ex typographia Joannis Zempel apud Montem Jordanum, 1758. pp. 259-275.
