= Santa Giusta =

Santa Giusta Santa Justa
- Comune
- Comune di Santa Giusta
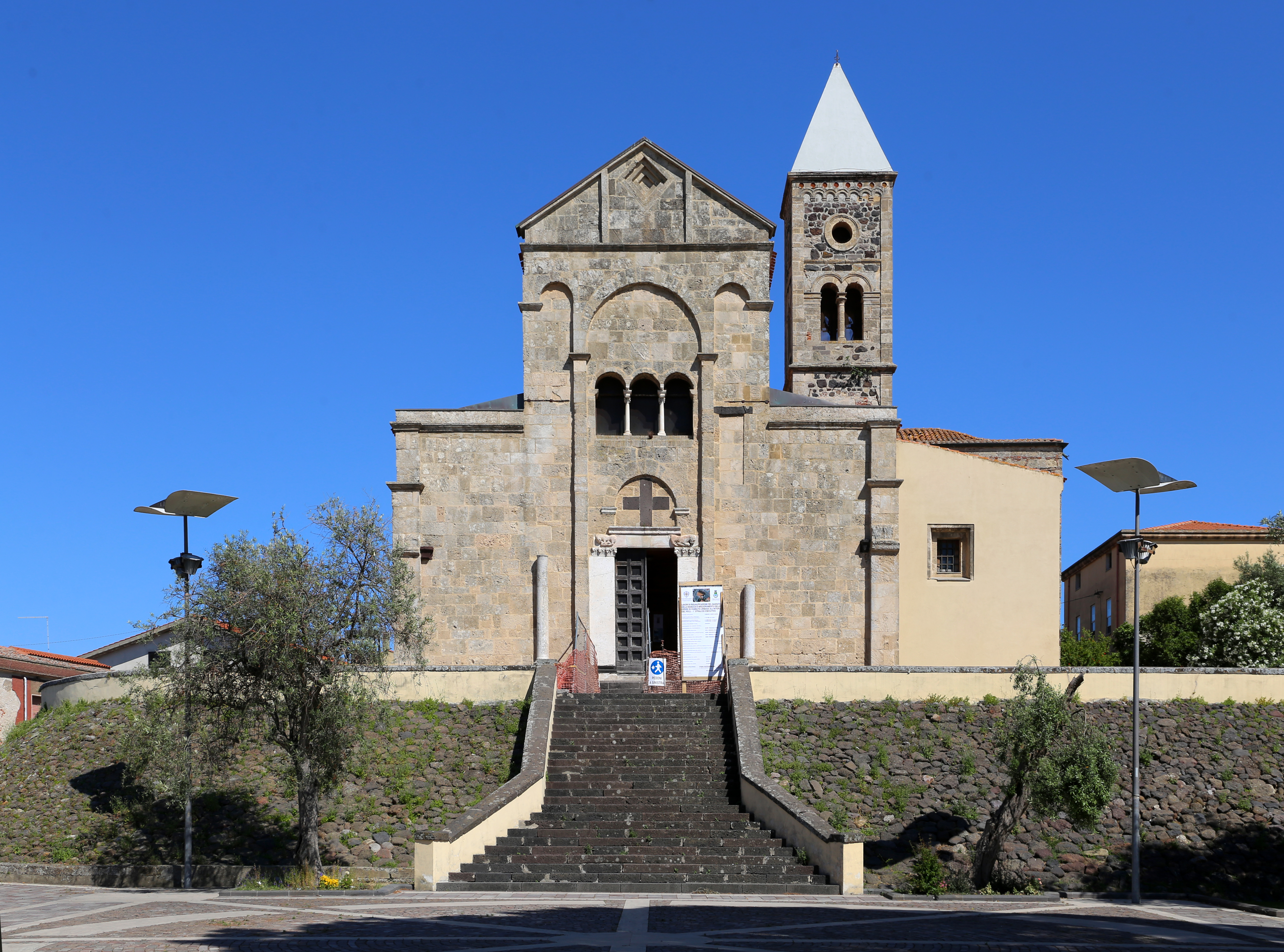
- view of Santa Giusta Cathedral

- Coat of arms

- Location within Sardinia
- Coordinates: 39°53′N 8°37′E
- Country: Italy
- Region: Sardinia
- Province: Oristano (OR)
- Frazioni: Cirras, Corte Baccas

Government
  - Mayor: Antonello Figus

Area
  - Total: 69.2 km^{2} (26.7 sq mi)

Population (30 November 2014)
  - Total: 4,875
  - Density: 70.4/km^{2} (182/sq mi)
- Demonym(s): Santagiustesi; Santajustesus
- Time zone: UTC+1 (CET)
  - Summer (DST): UTC+2 (CEST)
- Postal code: 09096
- Dialing code: 0783
- Patron saint: Santa Giusta
- Website: Official website

Santa Giusta (Italian pronunciation: [ˈsanta ˈdʒusta]; Sardinian: Santa Justa) is a comune (municipality) in the Province of Oristano in the Italian region of Sardinia, located about 90 kilometres (56 miles) northwest of Cagliari and about 3 km (2 mi) southeast of Oristano in the Campidano area.

== History ==
The site of the Phoenician port town of Othoca is thought to be at the bottom of a lake separated from the Mediterranean by a small isthmus, and modern Santa Giusta occupies some ancient sites. Previous excavations recovered 50 amphorae and the first chamber tomb of Phoenician origin found in Italy. Archaeologists led by Carlo del Vais of the University of Cagliari plan to excavate a portion of the lake where 100 amphorae appear to be located on a wooden platform covered by a thick mud layer.

== Main sights ==
- Santa Giusta Cathedral, former cathedral and now a minor basilica, an important Romanesque church
