= Giovanni Paolo Gibertini =

Italian Roman Catholic Bishop (1922–2020)

Giovanni Paolo Gibertini, O.S.B.
- Bishop of the Reggio Emilia-Guastalla
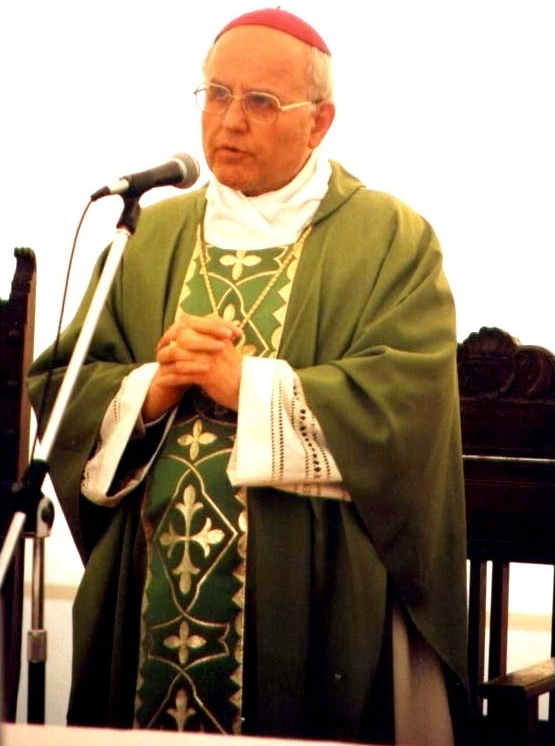
- Giovanni Paolo Gibertini (2016)
- Church: Roman Catholic Church
- See: Diocese of Reggio Emilia-Guastalla
- In office: 1989–1998
- Predecessor: Gilberto Baroni
- Successor: Adriano Caprioli
- Previous post: Bishop of Ales-Terralba (1983–89)

Orders
- Ordination: 12 August 1945

Personal details
- Born: 4 May 1922 Ciano d'Enza, Italy
- Died: 3 April 2020 (aged 97) Montecchio Emilia, Italy

Giovanni Paolo Gibertini, O.S.B. (4 May 1922 – 3 April 2020) was an Italian prelate of Catholic Church who was Bishop of Ales-Terralba from 1983 to 1989 and then Reggio Emilia-Guastalla from 1989 to 1998.

== Biography ==
Gibertini was born in Ciano d'Enza and ordained a priest on 12 August 1945 for the Order of Saint Benedict. He was appointed bishop of the Ales-Terralba on 23 March 1983 and ordained bishop on 25 April 1983. He was appointed bishop of the Diocese of Reggio Emilia-Guastalla on 11 June 1989 and retired on 27 June 1998. Gilbertini died on 3 April 2020 in Montecchio Emilia at the age of 97.
