= Gulf of Oristano =

Gulf in the Sardinian Sea

Coordinates: 39°50′16″N 08°29′04″E

Location of the Gulf of Oristano in Sardinia

The Gulf of Oristano (Italian: Golfo di Oristano, Sardinian: Golfu de Aristanis) is a gulf in the Sardinian Sea, near Oristano, in the western Sardinian coast. It is limited from north by the Cape San Marco, in the Sinis peninsula, and from the south by Cape Frasca. It faces the provinces of Oristano and Medio Campidano. Near the gulf area several wetlands (such as the Stagno di Cabras, the Stagno di Mistras and the Stagno di Santa Giusta).

The main human activities are fishing, fish farming and the manufacture market connected to fish, including the production of bottarga. Tourism is increasingly, especially in the localities of San Giovanni di Sinis, Marina di Torre Grande and Arborea Lido.
