= Archdiocese of Oristano =

Latin Catholic archdiocese in Italy

Coordinates: 39.9000°N 8.5833°E

Archdiocese of Oristano Archidioecesis Arborensis

Catholic
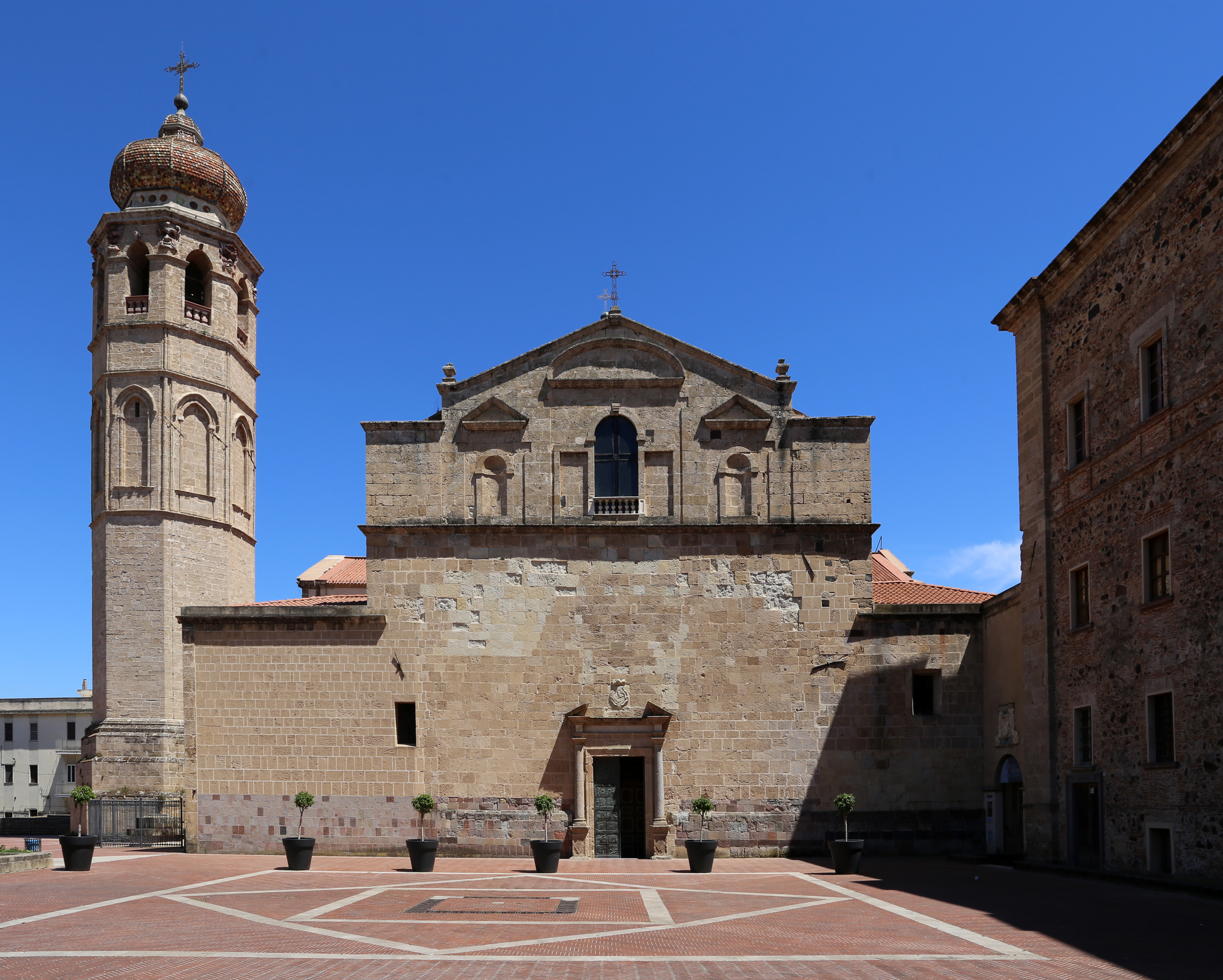
- Oristano Cathedral

Location
- Country: Italy
- Ecclesiastical province: Oristano

Statistics
- Area: 3,112 km^{2} (1,202 sq mi)
- Population: Total; Catholics: (as of 2023); 126,978 ▼; 126,549 ▼ (99.7%)
- Parishes: 85

Information
- Denomination: Catholic Church
- Sui iuris church: Latin Church
- Rite: Roman Rite
- Established: 11th century
- Cathedral: Oristano Cathedral
- Secular priests: 83 (diocesan) ▼1 (Religious Orders) ▼3 Permanent Deacons ▼

Current leadership
- Pope: Leo XIV
- Archbishop: Roberto Carboni, O.F.M.Conv.
- Suffragans: Diocese of Ales-Terralba
- Bishops emeritus: Pier Giuliano Tiddia, Ignazio Sanna

Map
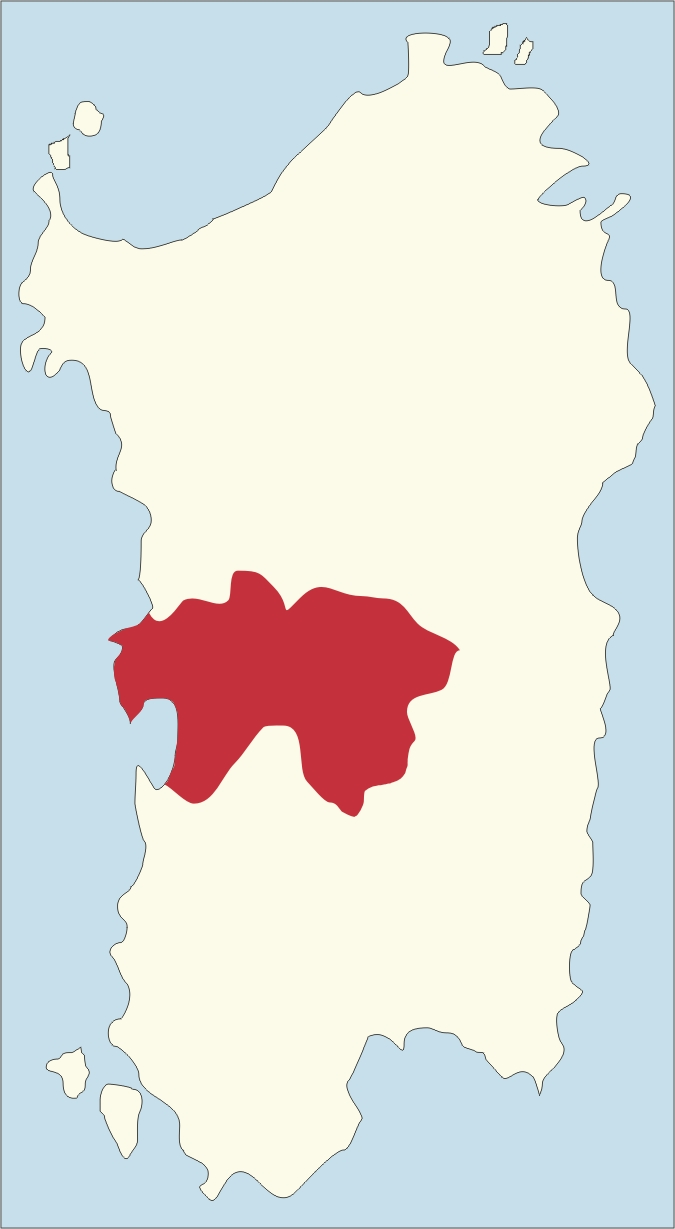
- Location of Archdiocese of Oristano

Website
- www.diocesioristano.it

The Archdiocese of Oristano (Latin: Archidioecesis Arborensis) is a Latin archdiocese of the Catholic Church in Sardinia, Italy. It was created in the eleventh century. Its only suffragan is the Diocese of Ales-Terralba.

== History ==
The judiciate of Arborea is already known by 1073, when the Iudex Orzocor is appealed to by the newly elected Pope Gregory VII for fealty and support for the Roman Church. An archbishopric is not mentioned. According to the Cronaca di Saccargia, the Iudex, the bishop, and the people had just (c. 1070) abandoned the ancient Tarrhos and moved to Arborea.

Pope Urban II (1088–1099) granted the Church of Arborea his protection; this grant was confirmed by Pope Eugenius III (1145–1153), and by Pope Honorius III in 1224.

An archbishop is credited by the Condaghe de sa Abadia de sa SS. Trinidate de Saccargia with participating in the consecrating of its church on 5 October 1116. The archbishop, who is unnamed, is identified as the su archiepiscopu de Oristanis rather than Arborea, an obvious anachronism, indicating that the reference does not come from an original document. It has been said that the condaghe is actually a late compilation arranged on a historical skeleton.

By 1157, the archbishops of Arborea already had a palace in the town of Oristano.

The city of Arborea was destroyed by Pisan forces in April 1164. The attack was led by Parasson, the Judex of Torres and his Pisan brothers and uncle, and by Peter, the Judex of Cagliari, the brother of Parasson of Torres. They burned the palaces, the homes, and anything else that was combustible; they carried off men, women and spoils. The Judex of Arborea fled to the Emperor Frederick Barbarossa; he also promised the Genoese that he would turn over the entire island of Sardinia. The emperor sent his legates and eight galleys to Arborea.

=== Pisan ecclesiastical control ===
In a bull of 11 April 1176, Pope Alexander III confirmed privileges granted by Innocent II and Hadrian IV, granting the archbishops of Pisa the status of primate of the ecclesiastical province of Torres. In 1176, the pope extended the status of primate over the provinces of Cagliari and Arborea, which included the right to summon bishops in those provinces to his councils and synods, the right to correct their excesses, and the right to have them adhere to apostolic doctrine. The primates could not, however, summon the archbishops to councils in Pisa without the permission of the pope. In October 1186, Pope Urban III confirmed the privileges granted to the archbishops of Pisa.

At the end of the 12th century, the Liber Censuum indicates that the Church of Arborea owed an annual payment of 6 livres of silver.

On 24 April 1296, Pope Boniface VIII united the dioceses of Arborea (Oristano) and Tyre.

=== Chapter and cathedral ===
Archbishop Torgotorio de Muru (1224–1253) erected the cathedral in Oristano, from 1225 to 1228, and dedicated it to the taking up of the body of the Virgin Mary into heaven. The building had a nave and four aisles, and five chapels. It stood for five hundred years until, in a state of near collapse, a rebuilding was begun by Archbishop Nin in 1729. The cathedral was served and administered by a corporation called the Chapter, which consisted of the Archpriest and twenty-two canons, each with a prebend.

=== Aragonese Sardinia ===
On 4 April 1297, Pope Boniface VIII issued the bull "Ad honorem Dei," accepting the feudal fealty of James II of Aragon, and investing him with the fiefs of Sardinia and Corsica. In return, the kings of Aragon promised annual subsidies in gold and troops. The arrangement was confirmed by Pope Clement V on 31 May 1309. It took several campaigns, over a quarter of a century, for the Aragonese to drive the Pisans out of Sardinia.

In the thirteenth century, the archdiocese of Arborea had three suffragan (subordinate) dioceses: Ales (Usellus), Santa Giusta, and Terralba.

=== Synods ===
Archbishop Oddo of Arborea held a synod in 1309. Archbishop Pietro Serra De Munoz (1510–1517) held a provincial synod. In 1566, Archbishop Gerolamo Barbera(no) (1566–1571) presided over a synod of the province of Arborea, in which the need for theological teaching and the creation of a priestly seminary was discussed. Archbishop Pietro de Vico (1641–1657) held a diocesan synod in 1656. Archbishop Pietro de Alagon (1672–1685) presided over a diocesan synod in 1684. A diocesan synod was held from 22 to 24 April 1708 by Archbishop Francesco Masones (1704–1717), and another in 1712. Archbishop Antonio Nin (1726–1740) held a diocesan synod, perhaps in 1740. Archbishop Luigi Emanuele de Carretto (1746–1772) held a diocesan synod.

=== Suppression of Santa Giusta ===
In the second half of the 15th century, several dioceses on the island of Sardinia were in difficulties due to financial shortages, as well as the movements of peoples. After extensive consultations with Ferdinand of Aragon and Isabella of Castile had taken place, plans were advanced to consolidate the troubled dioceses. Pope Alexander VI died, however, before the decisions were announced or implemented. After additional consultations, Pope Julius II, on 8 December 1503, in the bull "Aequum Reputamus," united the diocese of Santa Giusta with the archdiocese of Arborea (Oristano).

The abolition and transfer did not take effect immediately. In 1512 and 1513, at the Fifth Lateran Council (1512–1517), the archbishop is still Archbishop of Arborea. Pope Leo X issued a bull on 15 July 1515, confirming the bull of Pope Julius II. The titulature became "Archbishop of Oristano and Bishop of Santa Giusta."

Archbishop Pietro Serra De Munoz attended five sessions of the Fifth Lateran Council, between 10 December 1512 and 17 December 1513.

=== Developments of 18th century ===
Soon after his appointment in November 1726, Archbishop Antonio Nin became aware of the perilous condition of the cathedral. By 1729, the edifice seemed in danger of collapse, and the archbishop therefore took counsel with the cathedral Chapter, which agreed on the urgency of the situation, and architects were brought from Cagliari and Alghero to inspect the cathedral. Consensus was easily reached that the old cathedral could not be repaired, and that a new building was necessary. Structural work was completed by 1739, and decoration by 1742.

In 1744, the city of Arborea had a population of c. 7,000 persons, organized in a single parish. It also contained eight houses of male religious, and two monasteries for women.

The diocesan seminary for the education of priests was founded by Archbishop Antonio Canopolo (1588–1621), but the unpleasant climate and the difficulty in attracting competent teachers made his plan difficult to bring to reality. The reconstruction of the building of the seminary was begun by Archbishop Luigi de Carretto (1746–1772).

On 21 July 1779, by the Apostolic brief "Eam inter caeteras", Pope Pius VI restored the ancient diocese of Galtellina, moved the town of Nuoro into the diocese, and ordered that the diocese be called "Galtellinensis-Norensis". In drawing the boundaries of the new diocese, six villages were removed from the archdiocese of Arborea (Oristano) and added to the newly restored diocese.

=== Visitation of regular Orders ===
In 1830, Pope Pius VIII (Castiglione) issued orders for a general visitation of all the regular orders, male and female, on the island of Sardinia, and had appointed the Archbishop of Nicosia, Cajetano Avarna, as the Apostolic Visitor; but the pope died on 30 November 1830, before the operation had begun. His successor, Gregory XVI (Cappellari) re-authorized the Visitation, which was duly conducted, and its findings were submitted to the pope. On 17 July 1832, Pope Gregory appointed the Archbishop of Arborea (Oristano), Giovanni Maria Bua, his Apostolic Delegate to implement the reforms. Archbishop Bua was provided with a complete list of the changes to be made. The holding of Chapter meetings of the various Orders in their provinces was suspended. Elections of officers in the Orders was under the control of Archbishop Bua. Regular clergy who refused to obey the rules of their Orders were to be secularized. The taking in of new members (postulants, novices) was forbidden, until the Orders had reformed themselves.

In the archdiocese of Arborea (Oristano), the Dominicans were to be removed from the house in the village of Buschi, and from the house of S. Martino just outside Arborea, and transferred to the house inside Arborea. The Observant Franciscans were to be transferred from their house inside Arborea to the house of S. Mary Magdalene outside the city. Capuchins were to be transferred from their house in the village of Barumini to their house inside Arborea. The premises of S. Giovanni Evangelista in the city which had belonged to the Observant Franciscans were turned over to the Order of S. Vincent de Paul.

Since 2019, the Archbishop of Oristano has been Roberto Carboni.

== Archbishops ==
=== To 1378 ===
...

- c. 1146 : Comita de Laccone

...

- 1202–1223 : Bernardo
- 1224–1253 : Torgotorio de Muru
- 1254– ? : A...
- 1261– ? : Torgotorio Cocco
- 1268–1279 : Aleardus, O.Min.

○ [ (1279/80) : Egidius ]

○ [ (1279/80) : Daniel ]

- 1280–1289 : Pietro
- 1296–1299 : Scolay de Ardigellis
- 1299 : Alamanno, O.F.M.
- 1299–1301 : Consiglio Gatto, O.P.
- 1301–1305 : Leonardo Aragall, O.F.M.
- 1306–1308 : Ugone, Administrator
- 1308–1312 : Oddone della Sala
- 1312–1339 : Guido Cattaneo
- 1340–1342 : Giovanni de Paperonibus
- 1342–1349 : Pietro Munichi
- 1349–1360 : Nicolò
- 1360–1363 : Bernardo
- 1363–1377 : Ambrogio
- 1377–1378/9 : Enrico, O.Carm.

=== 1378 to 1621 ===
- 1379– ? : Joannes Salati, O.P., Avignon Obedience
- 1382–1386 : Giacomo, Roman Obedience
- 1386–1387 : Gonario, Roman Obedience
- 1387–1392 : Leonardo De Zori, Roman Obedience
- 1392–1396 : Corrado da Cloaco, Roman Obedience
- 1396–1400 : Ubaldino Cambi, Roman Obedience
- 1400–1403 : Mariano Fabario, Roman Obedience
- 1403–1404 : Paolo Olemi, Roman Obedience
- 1404 : Bartholomaeus Ghini, Roman Obedience
- 1404–1406 : Nicola Berruto, O.P., Roman Obedience
- 1406–1414 : Bertrando Flores, Roman Obedience
- 1414–1437 : Elia di Palmas, O.S.B.Camald.
- 1437–1450 : Lorenzo Squinto
- 1450–1454 : Giorgio Attacco
- 1454–1460 : Giacomo D'Alberale
- 1460–1462 : Francesco Arnesti
- 1462–1485 : Giovanni Dessì
- 1485–1492 : Ferdinando Romano
- 1492–1510 : Giacomo Serra
- 1510–1517 : Pietro Serra De Munoz
- 1517–1520 : Giovanni Briselot
- 1520–1530 : Giovanni Clerc
- 1530–1535 : Agostino Grimaldi
- 1536– ? : Goffredo Pugiasson
- 1537–1554 : Carlo de Alagon
- 1554–1556 : Andrea Sanna
- 1556–1565 : Pietro Sanna
- 1566–1571 : Gerolamo Barberano
- 1572–1574 : Pietro Buerba
- 1574–1577 : Pietro Noarro
- 1578–1588 : Francesco Figo
- 1588–1621 : Antonio Canopolo

=== 1621 to 1900 ===
- 1621–1627 : Lorenzo Nieto, O.S.B.
- 1627–1641 : Gavino Magliano
- 1641–1657 : Pietro de Vico
- 1657–1684 : Alfonso de Sotomajor
- 1664–1671 : Bernardo Cotoner
- 1672–1685 : Pietro de Alagon
- 1685–1702 : Pietro de Accorrà y Figo
- 1704–1717 : Francesco Masones y Nin
- 1726–1740 : Antonio Nin
- 1741–1744 : Vincenzo Giovanni Vico Torrellas
- 1744–1746 : Nicolò Maurizio Fontana
- 1746–1772 : Luigi Emanuele de Carretto di Camerana
- 1772–1776 : Antonio Romano Malingri
- 1778–1783 : Giacomo Francesco Tommaso Astesan
- 1783–1798 : Giuseppe Luigi Cusano di Sagliano
- 1798–1812 : Francesco Maria Sisternes de Oblites
- 1812–1821 : Giovanni Maria Azzei

(1821–1828) : Sede Vacante

- 1828–1840 : Giovanni Maria Bua
- 1842–1860 : Giovanni Saba

(1860–1871) : Sede Vacante

- 1872–1878 : Antonio Soggiu
- 1879–1882 : Bonfiglio Mura
- 1882 : Paolo Giuseppe Maria Serci Serra
- 1893–1898 : Francesco Zunnui Casula

=== Since 1900 ===
- 1899–1914 : Salvatore Tolu
- 1914–1920 : Ernesto Maria Piovella
- 1921–1938 : Giorgio Maria Delrio
- 1938–1947 : Giuseppe Cogoni
- 1947–1979 : Sebastiano Fraghì
- 1979–1985 : Francesco Spanedda
- 1986–2006 : Pier Giuliano Tiddia
- 2006–2019 : Ignazio Sanna
- 2019–pres. : Roberto Carboni

== See also ==
- Diocese of Santa Giusta

== Sources ==
=== Episcopal Reference Works ===
- Eubel, Conradus, ed. (1913). Hierarchia catholica (in Latin). Vol. 1 (Tomus 1) (second ed.). Münster: Libreria Regensbergiana. pp. 101–102.. Archived.
- Eubel, Conradus, ed. (1914). Hierarchia catholica (in Latin). Vol. 2 (Tomus 2) (second ed.). Münster: Libreria Regensbergiana. p. 92.. Archived.
- Eubel, Conradus, ed. (1923). Hierarchia catholica (in Latin). Vol. 3 (Tomus 3) (second ed.). Münster: Libreria Regensbergiana. p. 115.. Archived.
- Gams, Pius Bonifatius (1873). Series episcoporum Ecclesiae catholicae: quotquot innotuerunt a beato Petro apostolo. Ratisbon: Typis et Sumptibus Georgii Josephi Manz. pp. 838–839. (Use with caution; obsolete)
- Gauchat, Patritius (Patrice) (1935). Hierarchia catholica (in Latin). Vol. IV (1592-1667). Münster: Libraria Regensbergiana.
- Ritzler, Remigius; Sefrin, Pirminus (1952). Hierarchia catholica medii et recentis aevi (in Latin). Vol. V (1667-1730). Patavii: Messagero di S. Antonio.
- Ritzler, Remigius; Sefrin, Pirminus (1958). Hierarchia catholica medii et recentis aevi (in Latin). Vol. 6 (1730-1799). Patavii: Messagero di S. Antonio.
- Ritzler, Remigius; Sefrin, Pirminus (1968). Hierarchia Catholica medii et recentioris aevi (in Latin). Vol. 7 (1800–1846). Monasterii: Libr. Regensburgiana.
- Ritzler, Remigius; Sefrin, Pirminus (1978). Hierarchia catholica Medii et recentioris aevi (in Latin). Vol. 8 (1846–1903). Il Messaggero di S. Antonio.
- Pięta, Zenon (2002). Hierarchia catholica medii et recentioris aevi (in Latin). Vol. 9 (1903–1922). Padua: Messagero di San Antonio. ISBN 978-88-250-1000-8.

=== Studies ===
- Besta, Enrico. "Per la storia dell'Arborea nella prima metà del secolo decimoterzo." (in Italian). In: Archivio storico sardo Vol. 3 (Cagliari-Sassari 1907), pp. 323-334.
- Cappelletti, Giuseppe (1857). Le chiese d'Italia dalla loro origine sino ai nostri giorni (in Italian). Vol. decimoterzo (13). Venezia: Antonelli. pp. 227–244..
- Kehr, Paul Fridolin. (Ed.D. Girgensohn). Italia Pontificia (in Latin), Vol. X: Calabria – Insulae (Turici: Weidmann 1975). pp. 453–454.
- Martini, Pietro (1841). Storia ecclesiastica di Sardegna. Volume 3 Cagliari: Stamperia Reale, 1841. (pp. 355-359).
- Mattei, Antonio Felice (1758). Sardinia sacra seu De episcopis Sardis historia nunc primò confecta a F. Antonio Felice Matthaejo. (in Latin). Romae: ex typographia Joannis Zempel apud Montem Jordanum, 1758. pp. 233-253.
- Scintu, Salvatore Angelo (1873). Raccolta di memorie d'Arborea tratte in gran parte da documenti inediti. (in Italian). Oristano: Tipografia Arborense 1873.

==== External links ====
- David M. Cheney, Catholic-Hierarchy.org, "Archdiocese of Oristano"; retrieved: 30 January 2026.
- Gabriel Chow, GCatholic.org, "Metropolitan Archdiocese of Oristano;" retrieved: 30 January 2026.
- "Diocesan website" (in Italian).
- Diocese of Oristano, "Press office" (in Italian). Archived from the original on 2007-07-31. (diocesan events of 2007)
