= Diocese of Iglesias =

Roman Catholic diocese in Italy

Coordinates: 39.3167°N 8.5333°E

Diocese of Iglesias Dioecesis Ecclesiensis

Catholic

Location
- Country: Italy
- Ecclesiastical province: Cagliari

Statistics
- Area: 1,678 km^{2} (648 sq mi)
- Population: Total; Catholics: (as of 2023); 121,253 ▼; 120,000 (est.) ▼
- Parishes: 64

Information
- Denomination: Catholic Church
- Rite: Roman Rite
- Established: 18 May 1763 (263 years ago)
- Cathedral: Cattedrale di S. Chiara d’Assisi
- Secular priests: 60 (diocesan) ▼4 (Religious Orders) ▼5 Permanent Deacons ▲

Current leadership
- Pope: Leo XIV
- Bishop: Mario Farci
- Metropolitan Archbishop: Giuseppe Baturi
- Bishops emeritus: Giovanni Paolo Zedda

Map
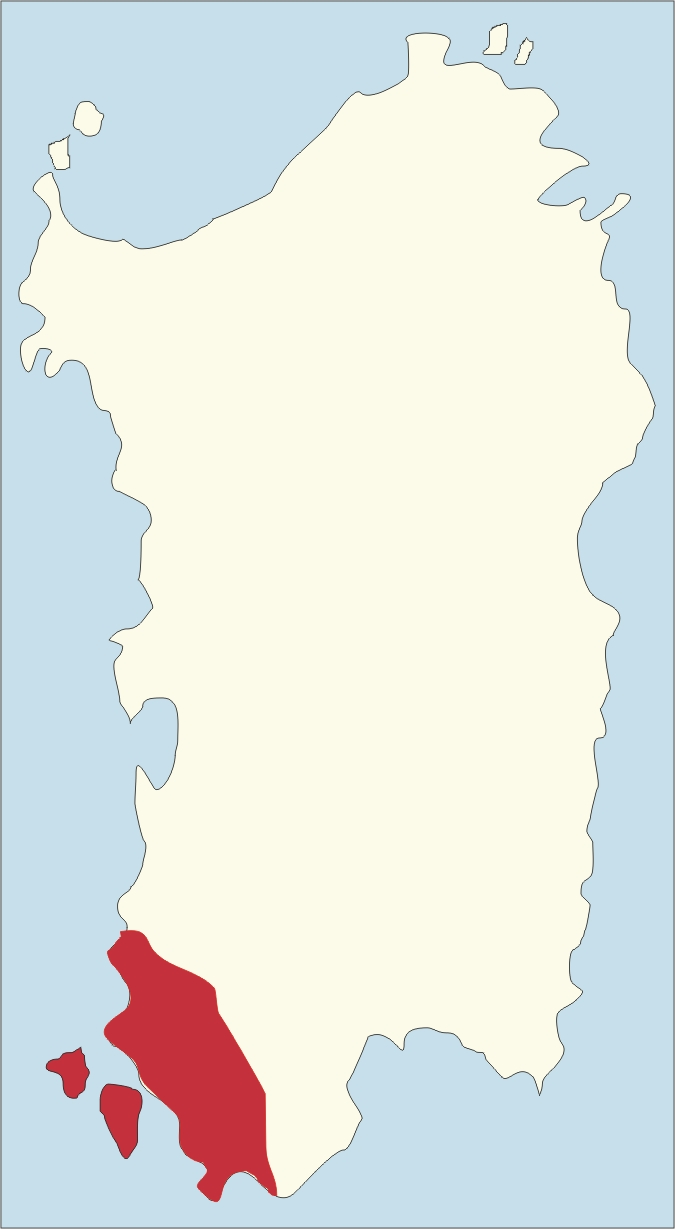

Website
- www.diocesidiiglesias.it

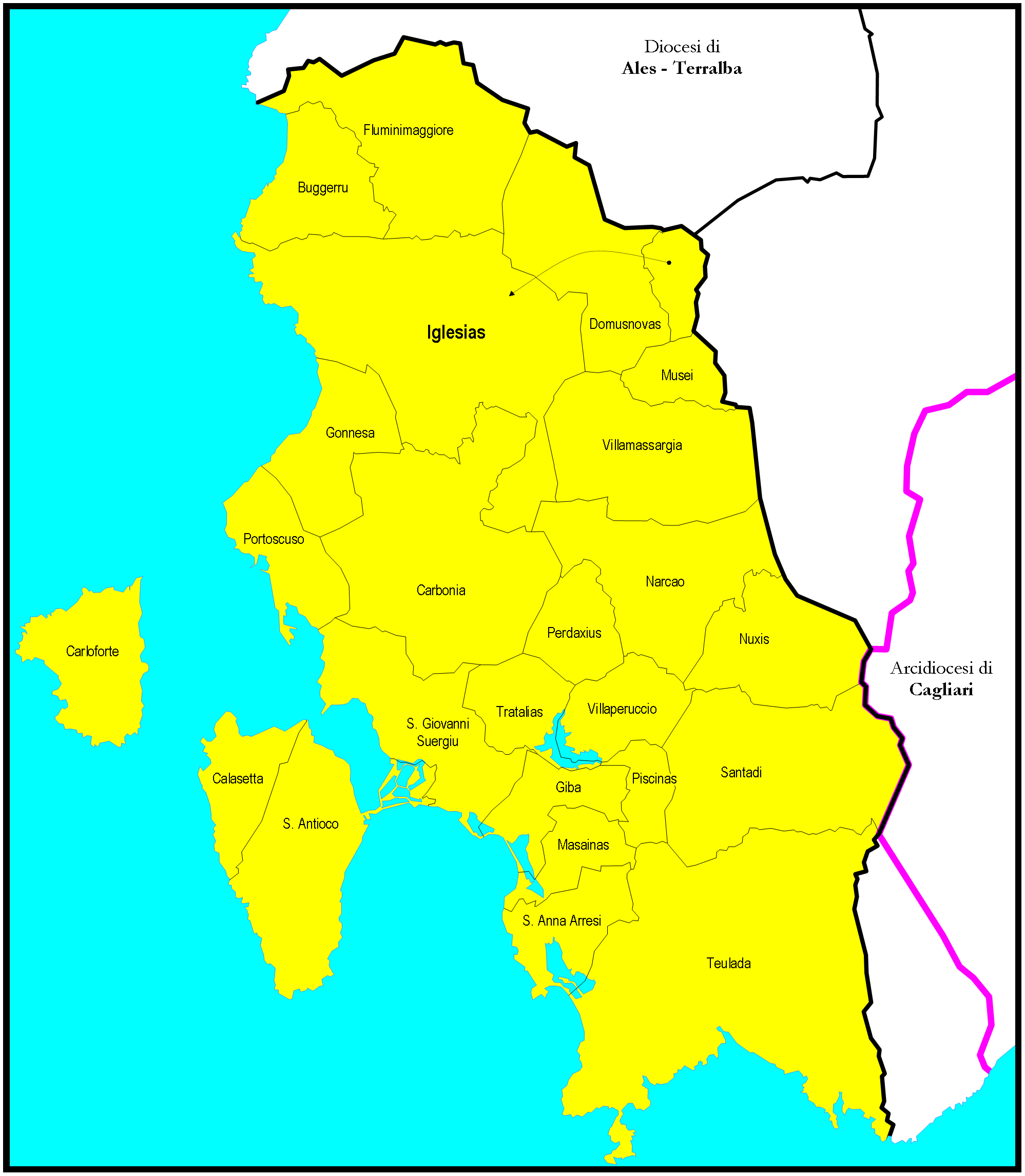
Parishes of Iglesias diocese

The Diocese of Iglesias (Latin: Dioecesis Ecclesiensis) is a Latin Church diocese of the Catholic Church in Sardinia. It is a suffragan of the archdiocese of Cagliari.

== History ==
The town of Sulci (later called Sant'Antioco) was located in the extreme southwest of the island of Sardinia, where a natural causeway links the island of Sant'Antioco with the mainland of Sardinia. The area was inhabited from the neolithic period, then by the bronze age Nuragic civilization, by the Punic peoples (9th to 3rd centuries), and the Romans. The earliest Christians appear to have arrived in Sulci as a result of deportations ordered by Roman emperors in the second and third centuries. The exile of S. Antioco (from Mauretania? or Galatia?) to Sulci is usually placed in the reign of Hadrian (117–138), though stories of his life are beset with many inconsistencies and uncertanties.. He is said to have been a martyr.

The Diocese of Sulci was an episcopal seat as early as the 5th century. On 1 February 464, the Vandal King Hunneric summoned to a meeting in Carthage the bishops of Sardinia, including Lucifer of Cagliari, Martinianus of Foro Traiano, Felix of Torres, Macarius of Elia delle Baleari, Boniface of Sanafer, and Vitalis of Sulci.

In the early 7th century, more than sixty African bishops were deported to Sardinia by the Vandals. After the city's decline, in the 13th century the bishop of Sulci took up his residence at the village of Tratalias.

Saracen invasions began in the first decade of the 8th century.

A dispute between Bishop Aimon of Sulci and Abbot Rainaldus of Montecassino erupted in the mid-12th century, over the possession of six churches in the diocese. Pope Eugenius III intervened in 1151/1152, ordering the two parties to appear before the archbishop of Cagliari and either come to an agreement or have a settlement imposed. Later in the year, the pope threatened Bishop Aimon with suspension if he did not come to a settlement in the presence either of the archbishop of Torres (Sassari) or the archbishop of Cagliari. Otherewise he would have to come to the papal court to answer for his actions.

In the Liber censuum of the late 12th century, Sulcis is mentioned as a suffragan of the archbishop of Cagliari.

The seat of the bishops of Sulci seems to have been transferred to Tratalias, where the church dedicated to the Virgin Mary was founded in 1213, and completed in 1282.

=== Schism ===
In 1297, Pope Boniface VIII invested King James II of Aragon as king of Sardinia. The kings of Aragon, however, had to conquer their new kingdom. In 1355, Peter IV of Aragon held his first court in Cagliari. Archbishop Giovanni d'Aragona led the bishops of the island, including Raimundus of Sulci and five others. When the disputed papal election of April 1378 led to the Western Schism, King Peter IV of Aragon and Sardinia, having sent ambassadors to Rome to collect evidence, and having discussed the affair in his court, chose to side with the Obedience of Avignon. His son-in-law, King Juan of Castile did the same as did his daughter Joanna, Countess of Ampurias (Sardinia).

Bishop Biagio of Sulci (Roman Obedience), Nicholas of Bosa, and Archbishop Bertrand of Arborea (Oristano) (Roman Obedience), attended the Council of Pisa in 1409, at which both Benedict XIII and Gregory XII were deposed for heresy and schism; but Benedict managed to retain control of Sardinia.

=== Sulci at Iglesias ===
Bishop Simon Vargiu(s), O.P. (1487–1503) moved his residence from Sulci to Iglesias, in consideration of the fact that Sulci was almost deserted. Joannes Pilares was appointed bishop of Sulci, or Iglesias, on 7 July 1503. On 8 December 1503, the seat was officially moved to Iglesias by Pope Julius II. The name of the diocese was not changed.

In 1514, the Bishop of Sulci, Joannes Pilares, was promoted to the archbishopric of Cagliari, and allowed to retain the diocese of Sulci This arrangement, in which one bishop held two dioceses at the same time, was continued until 1763.

=== Iglesias ===
On 18 May 1763, Pope Clement XIII issued the bull "Universi Christiani Populi" , restoring the diocese of Sulcis as independent of the archdiocese of Cagliari with its own bishop, with the diocesan name of Iglesias (Ecclesiensis). Luigi Satta was appointed bishop on 26 September 1763.

The cathedral of Iglesias (in the town then called "Villa Ecclesias or "Villa di Chiesa"), dedicated to Santa Chiara, was erected by the Pisans in 1285, though it has been restored in later times. The cathedral was staffed and administered by a corporation called the Chapter, which was composed of two dignities (the Archpriest and the Archdeacon) and sixteen canons. One of the canons was the Theologus, another the Penitentiarius, and a third the Parocco (parish priest of the cathedral). The previous cathedral located in Tratalias was built in a Pisan Romanesque style between 1213 and 1282.

The diocese of Iglesias in 1841 consisted of: one parish in the city, nine in other towns, and seven in the countryside.

The parish church of Saint Antiochus on the island of Sulci, which was more than 11 centuries old, and which had once been the cathedral of the diocese of Sulci, was granted the title and privileges of a minor basilica by Pope John Paul II on 3 September 1991.

== Bishops ==
=== To 1364 ===
- Vitalis (484)

...

- Petrus (mid VI)

...

- Eutalius (between 649 and 680)

...

- Raimundus (1090)
- Gregorius (1102)

...

- Arnaldus (1112)

...

- Aimon (c. 1151–after 1163)

...

- Marianus (1215)
- Bandinus
- Arzottus
- Gregorius (1263)
- Mordasicius Sismondi (1281)
- Comes (c. 1300–1324)
- Angelus Portasole, O.P. (1325–1330)
- Bartholomeus, O.Carm (1330–1332)
- Guilelmus Jorneti, O.F.M. (1332–1334)
- Guillelmus Jaffer (1334–1342?)
- Marianus
- Raimundus Gileti (1349–1359)
- Francesco Alegre, O.P. (1359–1364)

=== From 1364 to 1514 ===
- Leonardo, O.F.M. (1364– ? )
- Franciscus, Roman Obedience
- Leonardus, O.F.M., Roman Obedience
- Franciscus, Roman Obedience
- Andreas, Roman Obedience
- Conradus de Cloaco, Roman Obedience (1387–1389)
- Philippus, Roman Obedience
- Biagio, Roman Obedience (1398?– ? )

...

- Giovanni Cassani O.E.S.A., Avignon Obedience (1418–1441)

[ Raimondo de Torres, O.F.M. (1441) ]

- Sisinius (1442–1443)
- Antonius Presto, O.P. (1443–1447)
- Garsias, O.F.M. (1447–1461)
- Julianus (1461–1487)
- Simon Vargiu(s), O.P. (1487–1503)
- Joannes Pilares (1503–1514)

=== From 1514 to 1763 ===
From 1514 to 1763, the bishopric of Sulci was held by the archbishop of Cagliari.

=== From 1763 to present ===
- Luigi Satta (1763–1772)
- Giovanni Ignazio Gautier (1772–1773)
- Francesco Antonio Deplano (1775–1781)
- Giacinto Francesco Rolfi, O.E.S.A. (1783–1789)
- Giuseppe Domenico Porqueddu (1792–1799)
- Nicolo Navoni (1800–1819)
- Giovanni Nepomuceno Ferdiani (1819–1841)

Sede vacante (1841–1844)

[ Raimondo Orrù (1842) ]
[ Giovanni Stephano Masala (1842) ]

- Giovanni Battista Montixi (1844–1884 Died)
- Raimondo Ingheo-Ledda (1884–1907 Resigned)
- Giuseppe Dallepiane (1911–1920 Died)
- Saturnino Peri (1920–1929 Resigned)
- Giovanni Pirastru (1930–1970 Retired)
- Giovanni Cogoni (1970–1992 Retired)
- Arrigo Miglio (1992–1999 Appointed, Bishop of Ivrea)
- Tarcisio Pillolla (1999–2007 Retired)
- Giovanni Paolo Zedda (8 March 2007 – 6 October 2022 Retired)
- Mario Farci (30 Nov 2024)

== Sources ==
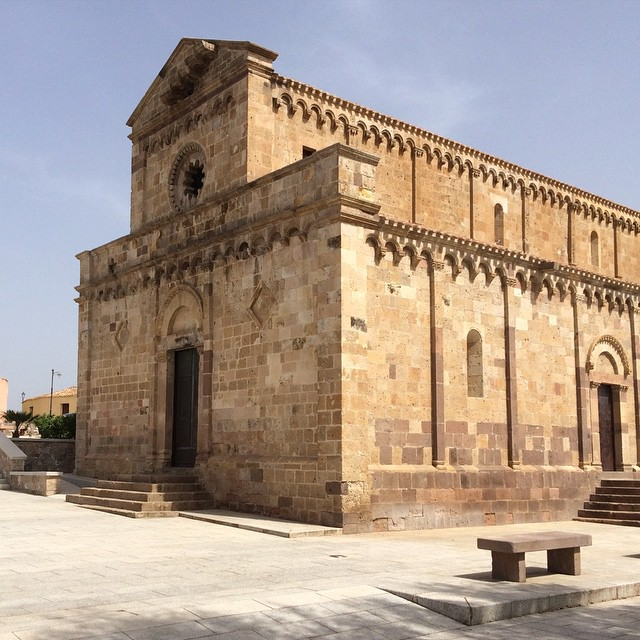
The church of S. Maria in Tratalias, used as a cathedral

=== Episcopal lists ===
- Eubel, Conradus, ed. (1913). Hierarchia catholica (in Latin). Vol. 1 (Tomus 1) (second ed.). Münster: Libreria Regensbergiana. pp. 468–469.. Archived.
- Eubel, Conradus, ed. (1914). Hierarchia catholica (in Latin). Vol. 2 (Tomus 2) (second ed.). Münster: Libreria Regensbergiana. p. 243-244.. Archived.
- Eubel, Conradus, ed. (1923). Hierarchia catholica (in Latin). Vol. 3 (Tomus 3) (second ed.). Münster: Libreria Regensbergiana. p. 306.. Archived.
- Gams, Pius Bonifatius (1873). Series episcoporum Ecclesiae catholicae: quotquot innotuerunt a beato Petro apostolo. Ratisbon: Typis et Sumptibus Georgii Josephi Manz. pp. 834–835. (Use with caution; obsolete)
- Gauchat, Patritius (Patrice) (1935). Hierarchia catholica (in Latin). Vol. IV (1592-1667). Münster: Libraria Regensbergiana. p. 87.
- Ritzler, Remigius; Sefrin, Pirminus (1952). Hierarchia catholica medii et recentis aevi (in Latin). Vol. V (1667-1730). Patavii: Messagero di S. Antonio.
- Ritzler, Remigius; Sefrin, Pirminus (1958). Hierarchia catholica medii et recentis aevi (in Latin). Vol. 6 (1730-1799). Patavii: Messagero di S. Antonio.
- Ritzler, Remigius; Sefrin, Pirminus (1968). Hierarchia Catholica medii et recentioris aevi (in Latin). Vol. 7 (1800–1846). Monasterii: Libr. Regensburgiana.
- Ritzler, Remigius; Sefrin, Pirminus (1978). Hierarchia catholica Medii et recentioris aevi (in Latin). Vol. 8 (1846–1903). Il Messaggero di S. Antonio.
- Pięta, Zenon (2002). Hierarchia catholica medii et recentioris aevi (in Latin). Vol. 9 (1903–1922). Padua: Messagero di San Antonio. ISBN 978-88-250-1000-8.

=== Studies ===
- Cappelletti, Giuseppe (1857). Le chiese d'Italia dalla loro origine sino ai nostri giorni (in Italian). Vol. decimoterzo (13). Venezia: Antonelli. pp. 83–93..
- Martini, Pietro (1839). Storia ecclesiastica di Sardegna. (in Italian). Volume 1 Cagliari: Stamperia Reale, 1839.
- Martini, Pietro (1841). Storia ecclesiastica di Sardegna. Volume 3 Cagliari: Stamperia Reale, 1841. (pp. 323-325), and Aggiunte, p.87.
- Martini, Pietro. Storia di Sardegna dall'anno 1799 al 1816. (in Italian). Cagliari: A. Timon 1852.
- Martini, Pietro (1861). Storia delle invasioni degli Arabi e delle piraterie dei Barbareschi in Sardegna. Cagliari: A. Timon 1861.
- Mattei, Antonio Felice (1758). Sardinia sacra, seu De episcopis Sardis historia nunc primò confecta a F. Antonio Felice Matthaejo. (in Latin). Romae: ex typographia Joannis Zempel apud Montem Jordanum, 1758. Pp. 125-138. (Selci)
- Turtas, Raimondo (1996), "La Diocesi di Sulci tra il 5. e il 13. secolo", (in Italian), in: Sandalion Vol. 18 (1995 pubbl. 1996), pp. 147-170.
