= Diocese of Nuoro =

Latin Catholic diocese in Italy

Coordinates: 40.3167°N 9.3333°E

Diocese of Nuoro Dioecesis Nuorensis

Catholic
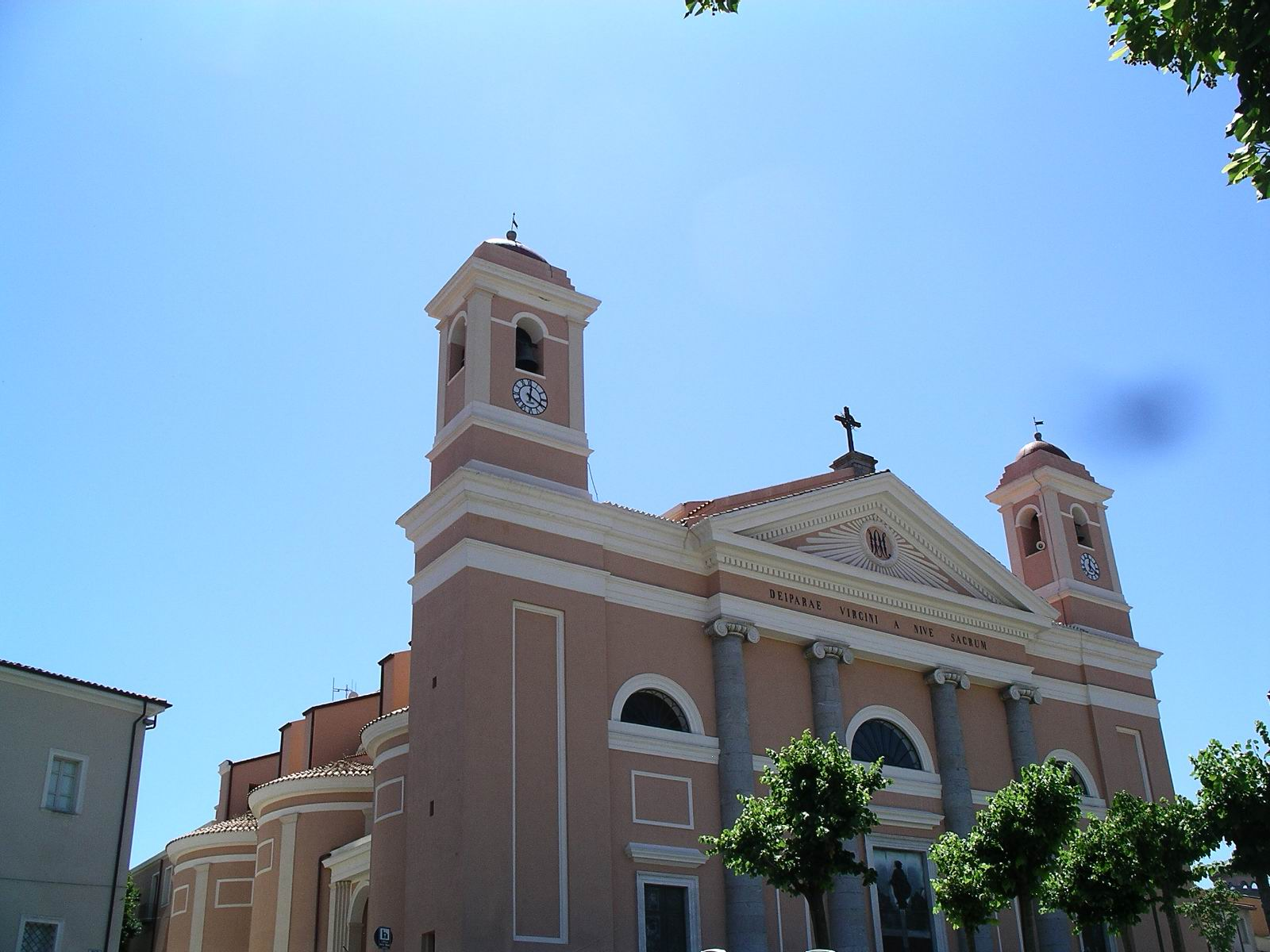
- Nuoro Cathedral

Location
- Country: Italy
- Metropolitan: Cagliari

Statistics
- Area: 2,806 km^{2} (1,083 sq mi)
- Population: Total; Catholics: (as of 2023); 116,360 ▼; 115,606 ▼ (99.4%)
- Parishes: 46

Information
- Denomination: Catholic Church
- Sui iuris church: Latin Church
- Rite: Roman Rite
- Established: 12th Century
- Cathedral: Nuoro Cathedral (Cattedrale di Santa Maria della Neve)
- Secular priests: 65 (diocesan) ▼4 (Religious Orders) ▼8 Permanent Deacons ▲

Current leadership
- Pope: Leo XIV
- Bishop: Antonio Mura
- Metropolitan Archbishop: Giuseppe Baturi
- Bishops emeritus: Pietro Meloni, Mosè Marcia

Map
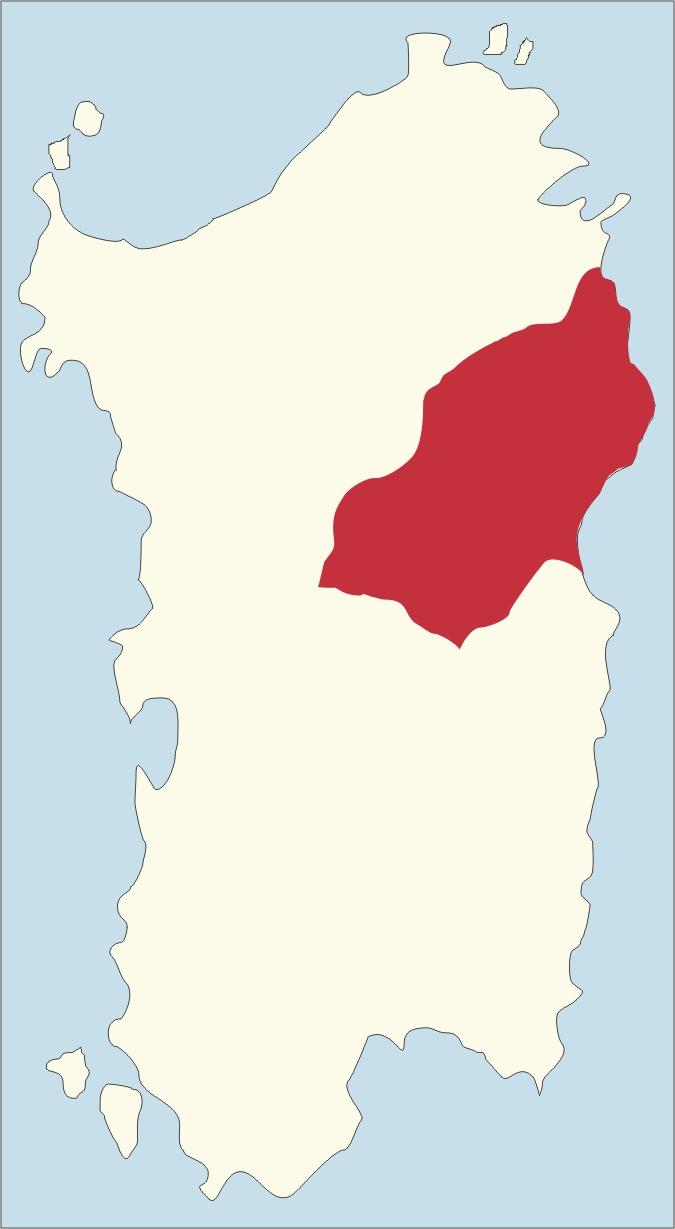

Website
- www.diocesidinuoro.it

The Diocese of Nuoro (Latin: Dioecesis Nuorensis) is a Latin Church diocese of the Catholic Church on the east-central coast Sardinia, facing the Tyrrhenian Sea. It is a suffragan of the archdiocese of Cagliari. Historically it was the diocese of Galtellì until 1779, and then the diocese of Galtellì-Nuoro until 1928. In 1928, it became the diocese of Nuoro.

== History ==
A bishop of Gallura, Villanus, is attested as late as 1114. Subsequently his diocese was divided in two: Civitas and Galtelli. Both were immediately subject to the Papacy until the papacy of Innocent II (1130–1143).

Galtellì was already an episcopal see in 1138, when Pope Innocent II made it a suffragan of the archdiocese of Pisa; but, by the mid 13th century, it was directly subject to the Holy See.

The cathedral of Galtelli was dedicated to Saint Peter. It was administered and served by a corporation called a Chapter, headed by one dignity, the Archpriest, and eight canons.

On 11 September 1495, Pope Alexander VI suppressed the diocese of Galtelli with the bull "Sacrosancta Romana Ecclesia", and its territory was united to the archdiocese of Cagliari.

On 21 July 1779, by the Apostolic brief "Eam inter caeteras", Pope Pius VI, responding to the request of King Victor Emmanuel III of Savoy and Sardinia, restored the ancient diocese of Galtellina, moved the town of Nuoro, a commune of c. 2,000 persons, into the diocese, and ordered that the diocese be called "Galtellinensis-Norensis". He directed that Nuoro be the seat of the bishop. The new cathedral in Nuoro was to be the church of Santa Maria ad Nives. The first bishop, Giovanni Serra-Urru, was appointed in the consistory of 18 September 1780.

In the 1920s, the bishop and authorities of the diocese and civil province of Nuoro were eager to shorten the designation of "Galtelli-Nuoro", and they therefore applied to the Vatican for permission. The Sacred Consistorial Congregation replied on 27 January 1928, granting permission, with papal consent, to style the diocese simply as "Nuoro".

Among its bishops was Fra Arnolfo de Bissalis (1366).

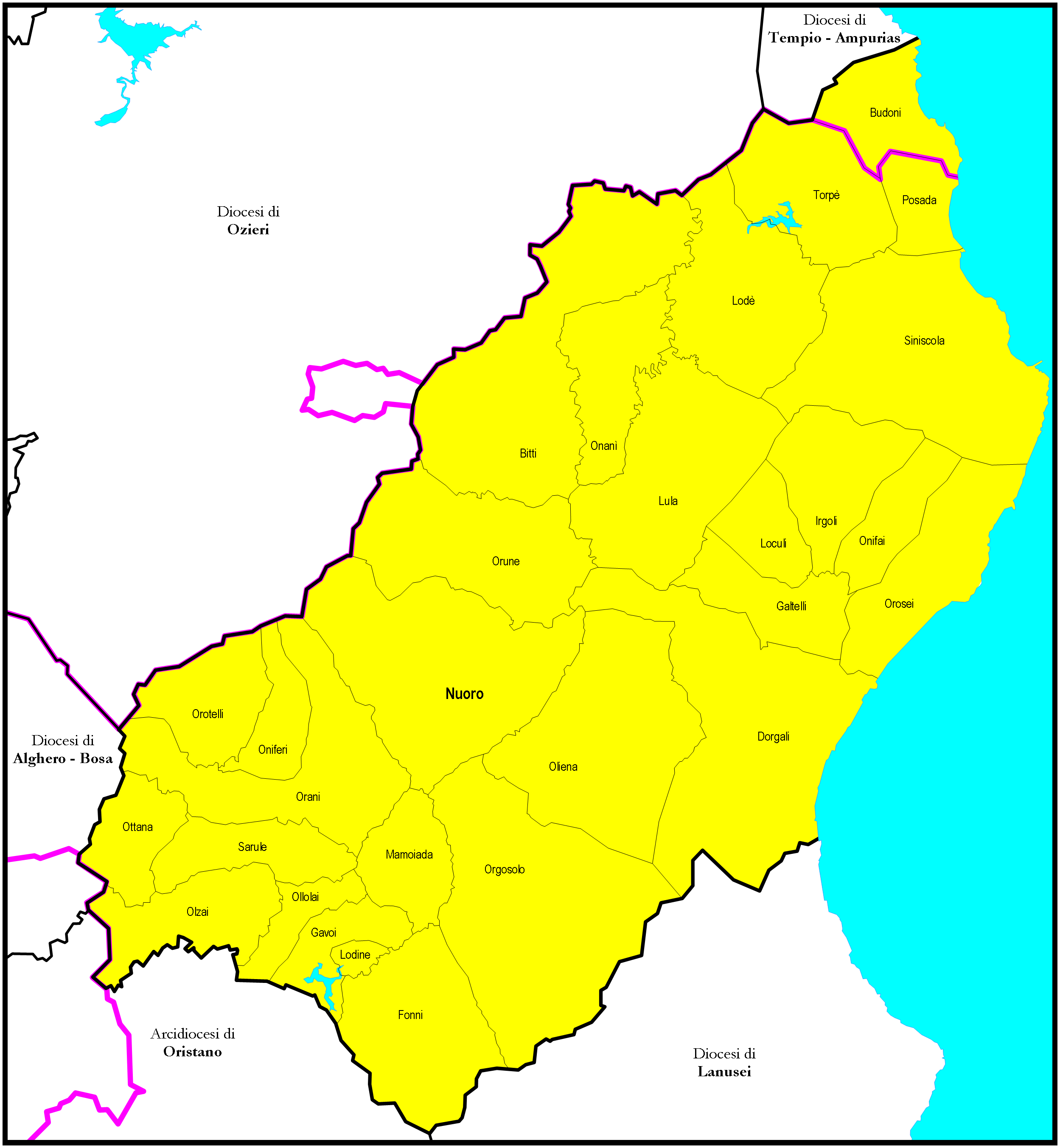
Parishes of the diocese of Nuoro

== Bishops ==
=== Diocese of Galtelli ===
Erected: 12th Century Latin Name: Galtellinensis

- Bernardus (1138)

...

- Ioannes (1173)

...

- Magister (1206)

...

- [Ignotus] (1302)
- Nicolaus (? – 1329)
- Gualterius, O.P. (1329–1333?)
- Simon (1333–1344/45)
- Antonius (1345–)
- Arnaldus de Episcopali, O.Carm. (1348 –)
- Albertus (1365– )
- Antonius de Sabatinis, O.Carm. (1376– )
- Antonius Petri, O. Carm. (1379– ) Avignon Obedience
- Guilelmus Arnaudi, O.Min. (1386– ) Avignon Obedience
- Antonius Roceres (1387– ) Roman Obedience
- Paulus de Roma (1394– ) Roman Obedience
- Bertrandus Flores (1404–1406) Roman Obedience
- Gerardus (1406– )
- Joannes de Mira(ca)pillis, O.P. (1419– )
- Joannes Ferrarii de Valencia, O.Min. (1426– )
- Guglielmo da Morana, O.Min. (1428–1432)
- Sebastian Abbatis, O.P. (6 Mar 1433 – 1451?)
- Laurentius Pugiol, O.Min. (1451–1457?)
- Giovanni Cicci, O.P. (1457–1467?)
- Giorgio Pernia (Pinna) (1467–1486)
- Guglielmo Oller (Ogler) (1487–1490)
- Guglielmo Vidal (1490–1493?)
- Giovanni Vincy (1494–1495)

=== Diocese of Galtelli-Nuoro (Galtelly Nori) ===
Name Changed: 21 July 1779
Latin Name: Galtellinensis-Nuorensis
Metropolitan: Archdiocese of Cagliari

- Giovanni Antioco Serra Urru (Sisra) (1780 – 1786)
- Pietro Antonio Craveri, O.F.M. Obs. (7 Apr 1788 – 7 Oct 1801)
- Alberto Solinas (17 Jan 1803 – 17 Jul 1817)
- Antonio-Maria Casabianca (29 Mar 1819 – 1828)

Sede vacante (1828–1848)

Administrator: Giovanni Maria Bua, Archbishop of Oristano (died 1840)
Canon Ciriaco Pala of Nuoro
Domenico Alessandro Valesini, Archbishop of Sassari

- Emanuele Marongiu Maccioni (11 Dec 1848 – 9 Oct 1852 Resigned)
- Salvatore Angelo de Martis, O. Carm. (22 Feb 1867 – 24 Jun 1902 Died)
- Luca Canepa (18 Feb 1903 – 11 Dec 1922 Died)
- Maurilio Fossati, O.Ss.G.C. (24 Mar 1924 – 2 Oct 1929 Appointed, Archbishop of Sassari)

=== Diocese of Nuoro ===
Name Changed: 27 January 1928
Latin Name: Nuorensis
Metropolitan: Archdiocese of Cagliari

- Giuseppe Cogoni (1930 – 1938)
- Felice Beccaro (1939 – 1946)
- Giuseppe Melas (1947 – 1970 Died)
- Giovanni Melis Fois (1970 – 1992)
- Pietro Meloni (16 Apr 1992 – 21 Apr 2011 Retired)
- Mosè Marcia (21 Apr 2011 – 2 July 2019 Retired)
- Antonio Mura (2 July 2019 – Present)

== Books ==
=== Reference works ===
- Eubel, Conradus, ed. (1913). Hierarchia catholica (in Latin). Vol. 1 (Tomus 1) (second ed.). Münster: Libreria Regensbergiana. p. 259.. Archived.
- Eubel, Conradus, ed. (1914). Hierarchia catholica (in Latin). Vol. 2 (Tomus 2) (second ed.). Münster: Libreria Regensbergiana. p. 157.. Archived.
- Eubel, Conradus, ed. (1923). Hierarchia catholica (in Latin). Vol. 3 (Tomus 3) (second ed.). Münster: Libreria Regensbergiana. p. 107.. Archived.
- Gams, Pius Bonifatius (1873). Series episcoporum Ecclesiae catholicae: quotquot innotuerunt a beato Petro apostolo. Ratisbon: Typis et Sumptibus Georgii Josephi Manz. pp. 837–838. (Use with caution; obsolete)
- Gauchat, Patritius (Patrice) (1935). Hierarchia catholica (in Latin). Vol. IV (1592-1667). Münster: Libraria Regensbergiana. p. 87.
- Ritzler, Remigius; Sefrin, Pirminus (1952). Hierarchia catholica medii et recentis aevi (in Latin). Vol. V (1667-1730). Patavii: Messagero di S. Antonio.
- Ritzler, Remigius; Sefrin, Pirminus (1958). Hierarchia catholica medii et recentis aevi (in Latin). Vol. 6 (1730-1799). Patavii: Messagero di S. Antonio.
- Ritzler, Remigius; Sefrin, Pirminus (1968). Hierarchia Catholica medii et recentioris aevi (in Latin). Vol. 7 (1800–1846). Monasterii: Libr. Regensburgiana.
- Ritzler, Remigius; Sefrin, Pirminus (1978). Hierarchia catholica Medii et recentioris aevi (in Latin). Vol. 8 (1846–1903). Il Messaggero di S. Antonio.
- Pięta, Zenon (2002). Hierarchia catholica medii et recentioris aevi (in Latin). Vol. 9 (1903–1922). Padua: Messagero di San Antonio. ISBN 978-88-250-1000-8.

=== Studies ===
- Benigni, U. (1909). "Galtelli-Nuoro, diocese of (Galtellinensis-Norensis)," in: The Catholic Encyclopedia Vol. VI (New York: Robert Appleton 1909), p. 371.
- Cappelletti, Giuseppe (1857). Le chiese d'Italia dalla loro origine sino ai nostri giorni (in Italian). Vol. decimoterzo (13). Venezia: Antonelli. pp. 95–99..
- Kehr, Paul Fridolin. Italia Pontificia (in Latin), Vol. X: Calabria – Insulae (Turici: Weidmann 1975). (p. 421)
- Mattei, Antonio Felice (1758). Sardinia sacra seu De episcopis Sardis historia nunc primò confecta a F. Antonio Felice Matthaejo. (in Latin). Romae: ex typographia Joannis Zempel apud Montem Jordanum, 1758. Pp. 280-285.

==== External links ====
- Cheney, David M., Catholic-Hierarchy.org, "Diocese of Nuoro". Retrieved February 29, 2016.
- Chow, Gabriel, GCatholic.org, "Diocese of Nuoro". Retrieved February 29, 2016.
