= Ernesto Maria Piovella =

Italian Roman Catholic priest and bishop

Ernesto Maria Piovella O.SS.C.A., Obl. Rho.
- Archbishop of Cagliari
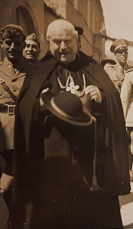
- Church: Catholic Church
- Archdiocese: Archdiocese of Cagliari
- In office: 8 March 1920 – 18 February 1949
- Predecessor: Francesco Rossi
- Successor: Paolo Botto
- Previous posts: Archbishop of Oristano (1914-1920); Bishop of Alghero (1907-1914)

Orders
- Ordination: 11 June 1892
- Consecration: 12 May 1907 by Andrea Carlo Ferrari

Personal details
- Born: 29 October 1867 Milan, Province of Milan, Kingdom of Italy
- Died: 18 February 1949 (aged 81) Cagliari, Sardinia, Italy

Ernesto Maria Piovella O.SS.C.A. (29 October 1867, Milan, 18 February 1949, Cagliari) was an Italian Roman Catholic priest and bishop.

== Life ==
He entered the oblate missionaries of Rho and served as secretary to bishop Pasquale Morganti at Ravenna. Pope Pius X made him bishop of Alghero in 1907, reportedly telling him: "You are a missionary: well then, go to Sardinia and be a missionary dressed as a bishop." He was ordained by cardinal Andrea Carlo Ferrari, archbishop of Milan, Pasquale Morganti O.SS.C.A., archbishop of Ravenna and Giovanni Mauri, auxiliary bishop of Milan. During his seven years in Alghero, he reorganized the diocesan curia and finances, held a synod with the clergy, restored the cathedral, and founded the Congregation of Christian Doctrine in every parish.

He was later made archbishop of Oristano (1914-1920) and archbishop of Cagliari (1920-1949). He called a diocesan synod in 1928. During the Second World War, after Allied bombing raids nearly destroyed Cagliari from February 1943, Piovella organized a communications service linking soldiers, evacuees, and their families through the diocesan seminary network.

He died on 18 February 1949 and was initially buried in the archbishops' mausoleum at Bonaria Cemetery in Cagliari. His remains were solemnly transferred to the Sacra Spina chapel in Cagliari Cathedral on 18 February 1965, a chapel he himself had built in 1933 to house the diocese's relic of the Holy Thorn. His beatification process has since begun.

== Sources ==
- Archbishop Ernesto Maria Piovella at Catholic Hierarchy
