= Ottorino Pietro Alberti =

His Excellency Ottorino Pietro Alberti
- Archbishop of Cagliari
- Appointed: 23 November 1987
- Term ended: 20 June 2003
- Predecessor: Giovanni Canestri
- Successor: Giuseppe Mani
- Previous post: Archbishop of Spoleto-Norcia (1973-1987)

Orders
- Ordination: 18 March 1956 by Giuseppe Melas
- Consecration: 8 September 1973 by Sebastiano Baggio

Personal details
- Born: 17 December 1927 Nuoro, Italy
- Died: 17 July 2012 (aged 84) Nuoro, Italy
- Motto: Veritatem facientes in caritate

Styles of Ottorino Pietro Alberti
- Reference style: His Excellency; The Most Reverend
- Spoken style: Your Excellency
- Religious style: Archbishop

Ottorino Pietro Alberti (17 December 1927 – 17 July 2012) was an Italian Roman Catholic archbishop who served as Archbishop of Cagliari from 1987 to 2003.

== Biography ==
Alberti was born into a prominent Family in Nuoro in Sardinia. He firstly had a bachelor in Agriculture in Pisa and later studied at seminaries in Pisa and Rome; was than ordained a priest in Rome on 18 March 1956.

Alberti was appointed as director (rettore) of Seminary in Cagliari in 1971. In 1973 he was also appointed as secretary and professor at Pontificia Università Lateranense.

In 1973 he was appointed Archbishop of Spoleto and Bishop of Norcia, in the same years Alberti was appointed as member of the Congregation for the Causes of Saints.

In 1987 he was elected to lead the church of Sardinia, being appointed Archbishop of Cagliari, becoming President of the Sardinian Episcopal Conference.

Alberti retired for age limit the 20 June 2003, and come back to his hometown Nuoro, where he died July 2012.

== Books ==
Alberti was an historian who wrote several books, mainly about the history of Christianity and the Roman Catholic Church in Sardinia. His works include:

- I vescovi sardi al Concilio Vaticano I, Rome, Pontificia università lateranense, 1963;
- La Sardegna nella storia dei concili, Rome, Pontificia università lateranense, 1964;
- Le relazioni triennali di Don Alfonso de Lorca, arcivescovo di Sassari, alla Sacra congregazione del concilio (1590-1600), Rome, Pontificia università lateranense, 1965;
- Problemi di origine in S. Ireneo, Rome, Pontificia università lateranense, 1966;
- Elementi di filosofia cristiana, Rome, Centro Ut unum sint, 1967-1968;
- Il dizionario dei concili, Rome, Pontificia università lateranense, 1968;
- La scienza nel pensiero di Teilhard de Chardin, Rome, Pontificia università lateranense, 1969;
- Scritti di storia civile e religiosa della Sardegna, introduced by Giancarlo Sorgia, Cagliari, Della Torre, 1994, ISBN 88-7343-257-3;
- La diocesi di Galtellì dall'unione a Cagliari (1495) alla fine del secolo XVI, Sassari, 2D editrice mediterranea, 2 volumes, 1993-1994;
- Presentazione a Domenico Filia, La Sardegna cristiana, riproduzione dell'edizione del 1909–1929, Sassari, Delfino, 1995, 3 volumes, ISBN 88-7138-122-X;
- Presentazione a La Sacra Bibbia. Tradotta in lingua sarda da Salvatore Ruju, traduzione di Salvatore Ruju, prefazione di Massimo Pittau, Nuoro, Solinas, 2003; new edition Sa Bibbia sacra. Edissione uffissiale de sa CEI, Cufferenzia de sos piscamos italianos; bortada in limba sarda dae Bobore Ruju, Cagliari, L'unione sarda, 5 volumes, 2006.
