= Arrigo Miglio =

Italian Catholic archbishop (born 1942)

His Eminence Arrigo Miglio
- Archbishop Emeritus of Cagliari
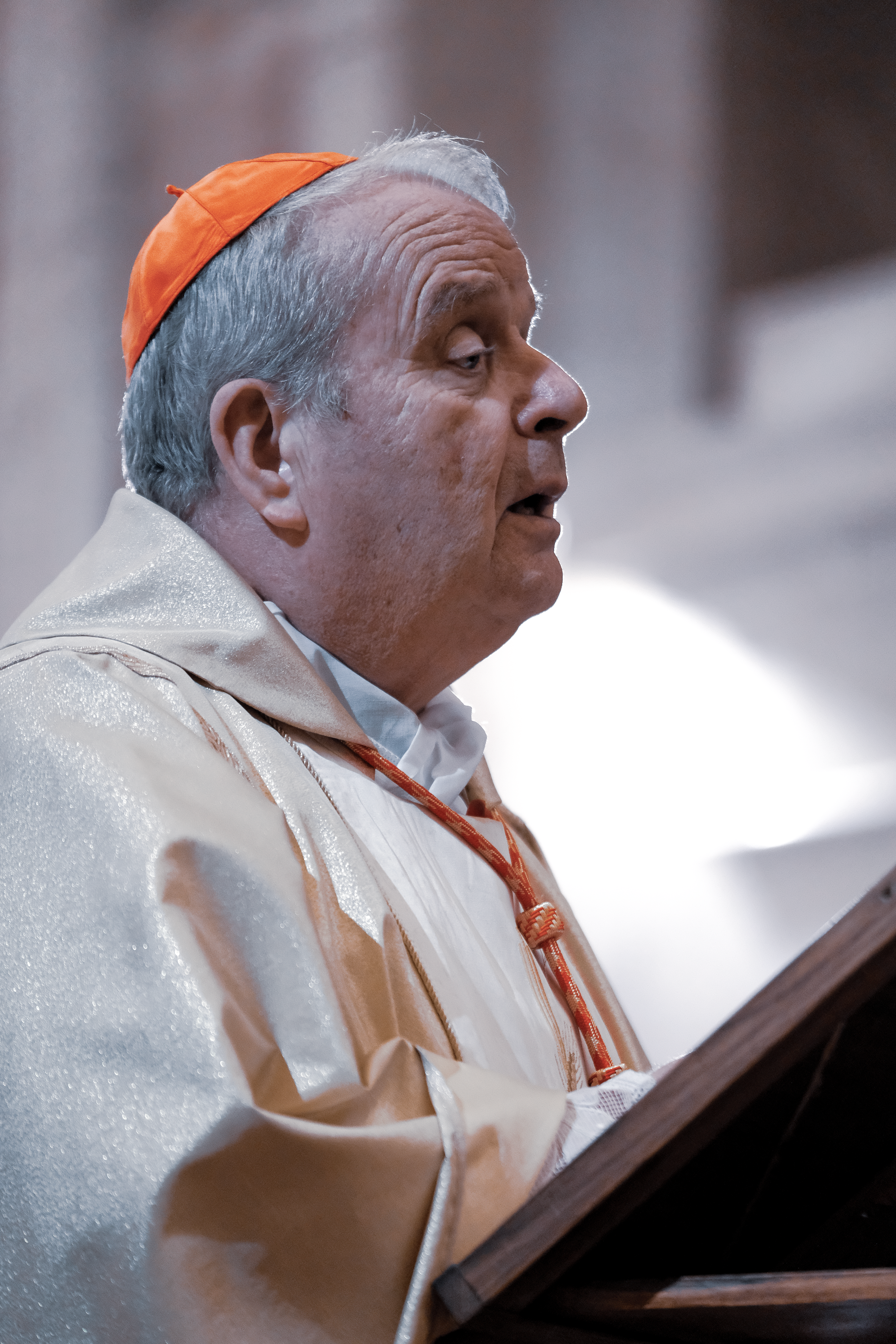
- Cardinal Miglio in Oropa on 25 September 2022.
- Appointed: 25 February 2012
- Term ended: 16 November 2019
- Predecessor: Giuseppe Mani
- Successor: Giuseppe Baturi
- Previous posts: Bishop of Iglesias (1992–1999); Bishop of Ivrea (1999–2012)

Orders
- Ordination: 23 September 1967
- Consecration: 25 April 1992 by Luigi Bettazzi
- Created cardinal: 27 August 2022 by Pope Francis
- Rank: Cardinal-Priest

Personal details
- Born: Arrigo Miglio; 18 July 1942 (age 83) San Giorgio Canavese, Italy
- Motto: Gaudium vestrum impleatur
- Coat of arms

Styles of Arrigo Miglio
- Reference style: His Eminence
- Spoken style: Your Eminence
- Religious style: Cardinal
- Informal style: Cardinal

Arrigo Miglio (born 18 July 1942) is an Italian prelate of the Catholic Church who was Archbishop of Cagliari from 2012 to 2019. He was Bishop of Ivrea from 1999 to 2012 and Bishop of Iglesias from 1992 to 1999.

Pope Francis made Miglio a cardinal on 27 August 2022.

== Biography ==
Miglio was born in San Giorgio Canavese, Piedmont, Italy, and was ordained on 23 September 1967. He was named Bishop of Iglesias on 25 March 1992, and was consecrated by Luigi Bettazzi on the following 25 April.

On 20 February 1999, Miglio was named Bishop of Ivrea. He is president of the scientific committee and organizer of the Social Weeks of Catholic Italians as well as a member of the Episcopal Commission of the Italian Episcopal Conference for social issues, labour, justice and peace.

On 25 February 2012 he was named Archbishop of Cagliari by Pope Benedict XVI, and received the metropolitan bishop's pallium on 29 June of the same year. Miglio has been president of the Sardinian Episcopal Conference since 3 September 2012.

On 22 September 2013, he welcomed Pope Francis to Cagliari and accompanied him to all his public appointments.

On 16 November 2019, Pope Francis accepted his resignation as archbishop and named Giuseppe Baturi to succeed him.

On 27 August 2022, Pope Francis made him Cardinal-Priest of San Clemente al Laterano.

Miglio is a former Grand Prior of the Sardinian Lieutenancy of the Equestrian Order of the Holy Sepulchre of Jerusalem.

== See also ==
- Cardinals created by Pope Francis
