= Lanusei Cathedral =

Cathedral in Lanusei, Italy

Coordinates: 39.879167°N 9.541389°E

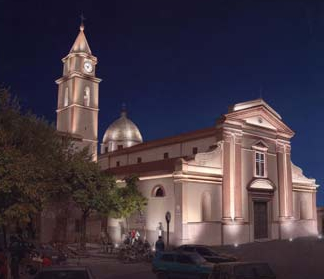
View from the north-west

Lanusei Cathedral (Italian: Cattedrale di Santa Maria Maddalena di Lanusei) is a Roman Catholic cathedral dedicated to Saint Mary Magdalene in the Piazza Vittorio Emanuele in the centre of Lanusei, Sardinia. Since 1927 it has been the seat of the Bishops of Lanusei (until 1986 the Bishops of Ogliastra).

== History ==
The existence of a parish church in Lanusei is recorded from the 16th century. The testimonies of Monsignor Melano in 1797 and Monsignor Navoni in 1822, both of them archbishops of Cagliari, are critical of the great decay into which the church had been allowed to fall. By the time of its eventual restoration in 1860 the church had become so degraded that no services had been held in it for a long time. The works involved the almost complete demolition of the old structure, to be replaced by a new church in Neo-classical style. Further repairs and alterations took place in 1927, when the episcopal seat of Ogliastra was transferred here from the former cathedral at Tortolì.

== Description ==
The west front is divided into three parts, the central one of which, bordered by two pairs of lesene to either side, terminates in a triangular tympanum. The side sections are linked to the central one by sinuous volutes. The doors of the single portal are made of bronze panels depicting the lives of saints, made in 1984. Above is a rectangular window surmounted by the tympanum. Next to the church is a square campanile, culminating in an octagonal turret topped off by a tented roof.

The interior has a central aisle and two side aisles under a barrel vaulted roof, divided by cruciform pilasters, and three chapels to either side. The presbytery, covered by an octagonal cupola, terminates in a semi-circular apse. The painted decoration of 1926-27 is by Mario Delitala, in particular the four tondi at the apex of the vault of the nave showing Mary Magdalene sinning, converted, penitent and glorified. Also by Delitala are the three canvases to the side of the presbytery of the Nativity, the Crucifixion and the Deposition. Among the other works of art, of especial note are an 18th-century wooden crucifix, some furniture from the old church and a bronze statue of 1983 by Enrico Manfrini of Saint George, bishop of Suelli, made on the occasion of the proclamation of Saint George to joint patron of the diocese of Ogliastra (successor to the more ancient diocese of Suelli, suppressed in the 15th century).
