= Roman Catholic Diocese of Sulci =

The Diocese of Sulcis or Diocese of Sulci (Latin: Dioecesis Sulcitana) was a Roman Catholic diocese located in the Sulcis region in the Province of South Sardinia. Erected in 484, it was suppressed in 1514. In 1966, it was restored as a Titular Episcopal See.

== Ordinaries ==
- Mariano da Sulci ( 1215 Appointed - 27 Mar 1218 Appointed, Archbishop of Cagliari)
- Mordascius Sismondi ( 1281 Appointed - )
- Comita ( 1300 Appointed - 1324 Died)
- Angelo di Portasole (Portasola, Porta Sole, Porta Sola), O.P. (24 Apr 1325 Appointed - 12 Feb 1330 Appointed, Bishop of Grosseto)
- Bartolomeo, O. Carm. (12 Feb 1330 Appointed - 1332 Died)
- Guglielmo Jornet, O.F.M. (24 Apr 1332 Appointed - 1334 Died)
- Guglielmo Jaffer (8 Apr 1334 Appointed - )
- Mariano ( 1342 Appointed - 1349 Died)
- Ramón Gilet (18 May 1349 Appointed - 1359 Died)
- Francesco Alegre, O.P. (8 Jun 1359 Appointed - 1364 Died)
- Leonardus, O.F.M. (27 Nov 1364 Appointed - )
- Corrado de Cloaco (24 Apr 1387 Appointed - 1389 Resigned)
- Filippo (5 Apr 1389 Appointed - )
- Biagio di Prato (4 Apr 1398 Confirmed - 1409 Died)
- Giovanni Cassani, O.E.S.A. (4 May 1418 Appointed - 1441 Died)
- Sisinnio (19 Nov 1442 Appointed - 5 Jul 1443 Appointed, Bishop of Ampurias)
- Antonio Presto, O.P. (24 Jul 1443 Appointed - 1447 Died)
- Garsias, O.F.M. (22 Sep 1447 Appointed - 1461 Died)
- Giuliano Matovi, O.P. (6 Nov 1461 Appointed - 1487 Died)
- Simon Vargius, O.F.M. (4 Apr 1487 Appointed - 1503 Died)
- Juan Pilars (1503–1514 Appointed, Archbishop of Cagliari)
