= Pact of the Catacombs =

Vow of poverty by 42 bishops of the Catholic Church

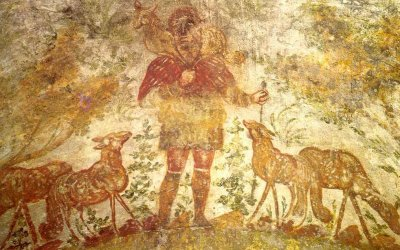
Painting of the Good Shepherd at the Catacombs of Domitilla

The Pact of the Catacombs, also known as the Thirteen Commitments, is an agreement signed by 42 bishops of the Catholic Church at a meeting following Mass in the Catacombs of Domitilla near Rome on the evening of 16 November 1965, three weeks before the close of the Second Vatican Council. They pledged to live like the poorest of their parishioners and adopt a lifestyle free of attachment to ordinary possessions. The signatories said they "renounce forever the appearance and the substance of wealth, especially in clothing [...] and symbols made of precious metals". More than 500 bishops added their signatures during the next few months.

The catacomb metaphor was intended to draw a connection to early Christian martyrs who lived without worldly power.

== History ==
Laying the theological foundation for the pact, Cardinal Giacomo Lercaro, Archbishop of Bologna, in December 1962 addressed the Council at length on the centrality of poverty. He concluded that "the question of the church of the poor [...] should be the general and synthesizing subject of the whole Council." Hélder Câmara, then Archbishop of Olinda e Recife, Brazil, was the moving force behind the Pact itself. Others included the Brazilian bishops Antônio Batista Fragoso of Crateús and Jose Maria Pires of Araçuaí; Manuel Larraín Errázuriz of Talca, Chile; Tulio Botero of Medellín, Colombia; Marcos Gregorio McGrath of Santiago de Veraguas, Panama; and Leonidas Proaño of Riobamba, Ecuador. Charles-Marie Himmer of Tournai, Belgium, presided at the Mass. The only North American bishop among the first to sign was Gerard-Marie Coderre of Saint-Jean-de-Quebec.

Luigi Bettazzi, who was Auxiliary Bishop of Bologna under Lercaro when he signed, was the last survivor of the original signors. He said a few bishops created the document and then plans for a signing ceremony spread by word of mouth. He felt the document was forgotten because Pope Paul VI, given the Cold War environment of his papacy, preferred not to be associated with its implicit criticism of capitalism. He has also cited the impact of the upheavals of 1968, which "frightened everyone and everything closed down". Thus it failed to put poverty at the center of the Church's mission, except in Latin America where it became associated with liberation theology.

The document itself has been lost and later re-produced.

As the fiftieth anniversary of its signing approached, the pact gained increasing notice due to the efforts of theologians and historians, especially in Germany, to draw attention to its significance. The Pontifical Urban University held a conference on its legacy in November 2015. According to Bettazzi: "The Pact of the Catacombs today is [...] Pope Francis". Cardinal Walter Kasper, who mentioned the pact in his book Mercy (2014), has said of Pope Francis: "His program is to a high degree what the Catacomb Pact was".

== See also ==
- Second Episcopal Conference of Latin America
- Bologna School (Vatican II)
- Saint Gallen Group
