= Giuseppe Mani =

Italian Roman Catholic archbishop (born 1936)

His Excellency Giuseppe Mani
- Archbishop of Cagliari
- Appointed: 20 June 2003
- Term ended: 25 February 2012
- Predecessor: Ottorino Pietro Alberti
- Successor: Arrigo Miglio

Orders
- Ordination: 12 March 1960
- Consecration: 7 December 1987 by Ugo Poletti

Personal details
- Born: 21 June 1936 (age 90) Rufina, Italy
- Motto: Surrexit Dominus vere
- Coat of arms

Styles of Giuseppe Mani
- Reference style: His Excellency; The Most Reverend
- Spoken style: Your Excellency
- Religious style: Archbishop

Giuseppe Mani (born 21 June 1936) is an Italian Roman Catholic archbishop, who served as Archbishop of Cagliari from 2003 to 2012.

== Biography ==
Mani was ordained on 12 March 1960 and began his ministry at the Diocese of Fiesole.

On 29 October 1987 he became the Auxiliary bishop of the Diocese of Rome and was consecrated by Cardinal Ugo Poletti on 7 December 1987. He became Military ordinary of Italy on 31 January 1996. On 20 June 2003 Pope John Paul II named him Archbishop of Cagliari.

During Pope Benedict XVI's visit to Cagliari, on 7 September 2008, the archbishop accompanied him to all his public appointments.

Preceded by Giovanni Marra	Military Ordinary of Italy; 1996; 2003	Succeeded by Angelo Bagnasco
Preceded by Ottorino Alberti	Archbishop of Cagliari; 2003–	Succeeded by Arrigo Miglio
