= Juan Pilars =

Most Reverend Juan Pilars
- Archbishop of Cagliari
- Church: Catholic Church
- Archdiocese: Archdiocese of Cagliari
- In office: 1514–1521
- Predecessor: Pietro Pilares
- Successor: Jerónimo Vilanova

Personal details
- Died: 1521 Cagliari, Sardinia

Juan Pilars (died 1521) was a Roman Catholic prelate who served as Archbishop of Cagliari (1514–1521) and Bishop of Sulcis (1503–1514).

== Biography ==
On 7 July 1503, he was appointed during the papacy of Pope Alexander VI as Bishop of Sulcis in Sardinia. On 9 January 1514, he was appointed during the papacy of Pope Leo X as Archbishop of Cagliari in Sardinia. He served as until his death in 1521. In the 16th century Sardinia belonged to Habsburg Spain. Presumably Juan Pilars descended from the Spanish Pilars family from Zaragoza. Another theory indicates that he was from Bohemia, also part of Habsburg Empire.

== External links and additional sources ==
- Cheney, David M. "Archdiocese of Cagliari". Catholic-Hierarchy.org. (for Chronology of Bishops)^{self-published}
- Chow, Gabriel. "Metropolitan Archdiocese of Cagliari (Italy)". GCatholic.org. (for Chronology of Bishops)^{self-published}

Catholic Church titles
Preceded by	Bishop of Sulcis; 1503–1514	Succeeded by
Preceded by Pietro Pilares	Archbishop of Cagliari; 1514–1521	Succeeded by Jerónimo Vilanova
