= Diocese of Lanusei =

Latin Catholic diocese in Italy

Coordinates: 39.8833°N 9.5500°E

Diocese of Lanusei Dioecesis Oleastrensis

Catholic
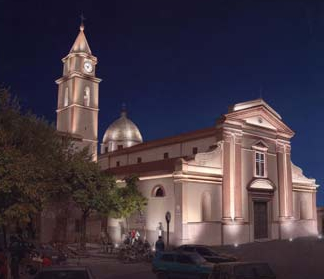
- Cathedral of Lanusei

Location
- Country: Italy
- Metropolitan: Cagliari

Statistics
- Area: 2,348 km^{2} (907 sq mi)
- Population: Total; Catholics: (as of 2023); 67,315 ▼; 65,635 ▼ (97.5%)
- Parishes: 34

Information
- Denomination: Catholic Church
- Sui iuris church: Latin Church
- Rite: Roman Rite
- Established: 8 November 1824 (201 years ago)
- Cathedral: Cattedrale di S. Maria Maddalena
- Secular priests: 42 (diocesan) ▼1 (religious Order) ▼8 Permanent Deacons ▲

Current leadership
- Pope: Leo XIV
- Bishop: Antonio Mura
- Metropolitan Archbishop: Giuseppe Butari

Map
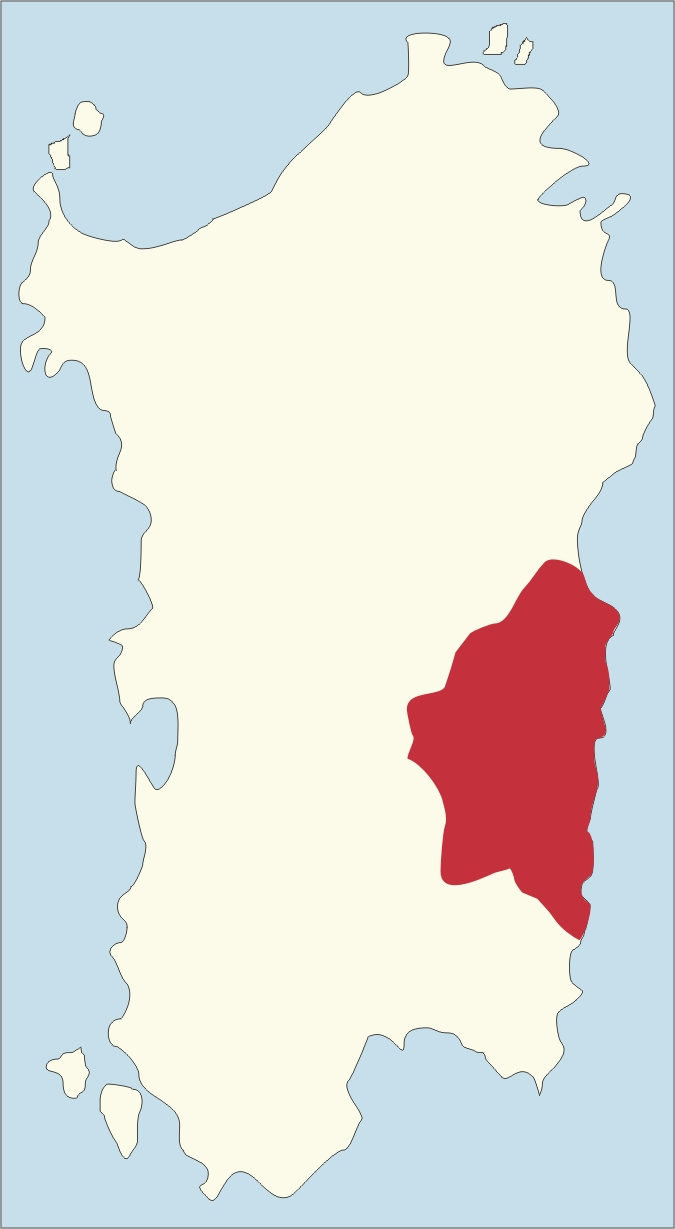

Website
- Diocesan web site (in Italian)

The Diocese of Lanusei (Latin: Dioecesis Oleastrensis) is a Latin Church diocese of the Catholic Church in eastern Sardinia, facing the Tyrrhenian Sea. Before 1986, the vernacular name was the diocese of Ogliastra (diocesi di Ogliastra); it retains the name Oleastrensis in official Latin reference, but in Italian it is the diocese of Lanusei. It is a suffragan of the archdiocese of Cagliari.

== History ==
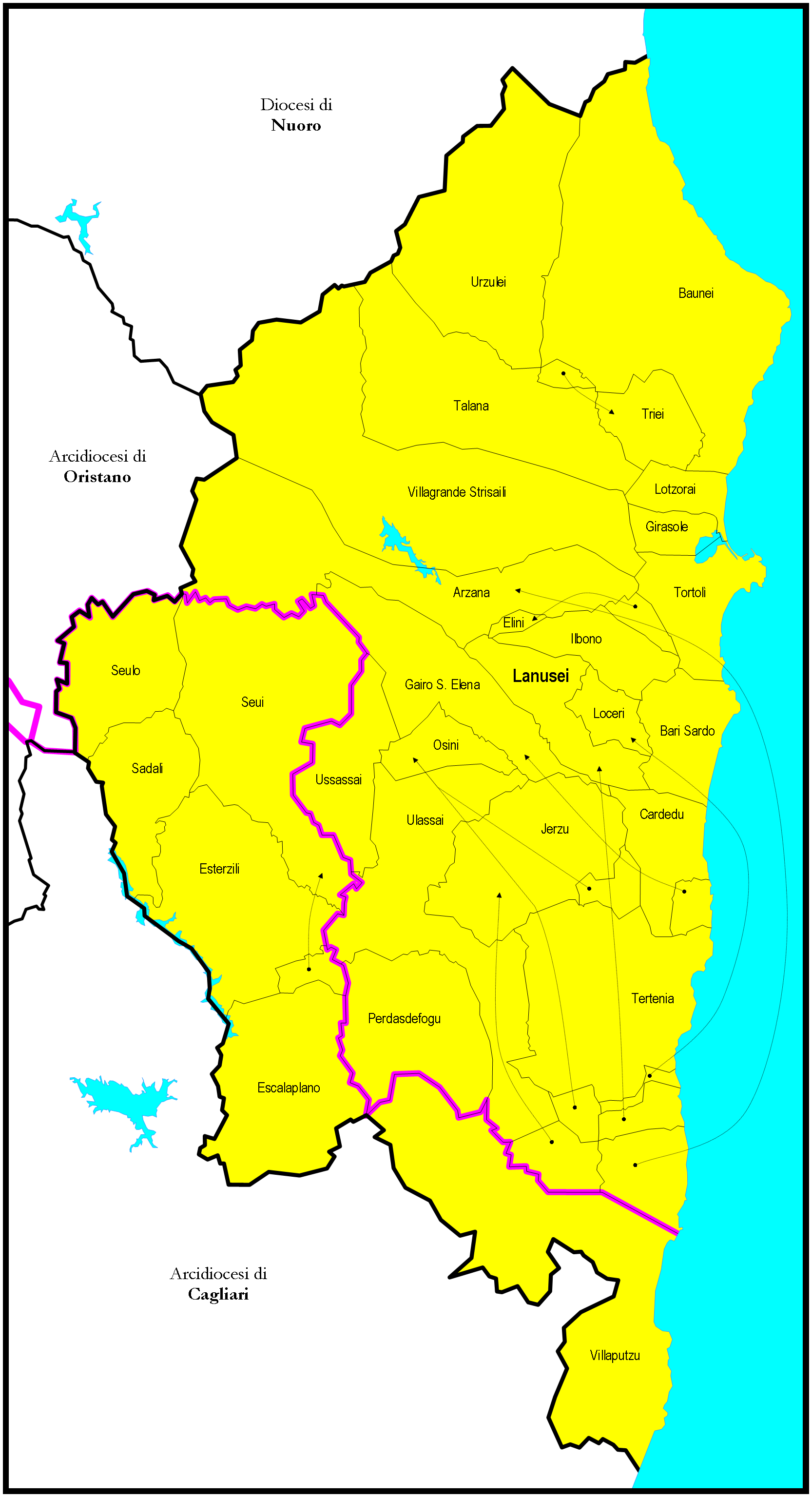
Parishes of Lanusei diocese

Ogliastra was a commune and a province, a former Judicature, in the Archdiocese of Cagliari. Interest in a new diocese in Ogliastra begaan in 1797, according to Pope Leo XII. In 1796, King Victor Amadeus III had been forced to cede the duchy of Savoy to the French in the Treaty of Paris in May, but he died in October 1796. His son, Prince Charles Felix of Sardinia visited the island from February to September 1797, but with the arrest, deportation and death of Pope Pius VI (1797–1799), the French occupation of Italy, the annexation of the Papal States by France, and the deportation and imprisonment of Pope Pius VII from 1809 to 1814, nothing could be accomplished. The finances of the House of Savoy, in addition, had been greatly diminished. The Congress of Vienna restored Savoy and the Papal States in 1815. At the time of the nomination of Bishop Nicolo Navoni to be archbishop of Cagliari in February 1819, Charles Felix again brought forward the idea of a new diocese at Ogliastra. He became King of Sardinia on 12 March 1821.

On 24 March 1819, the province of Ogliastra was detached from the archdiocese of Cagliari by decree of Pope Pius VII.

At the petition of King Charles Felix of Sardinia, by the bull "Apostolatus officium" of 11 November 1824, Pope Leo XII erected Ogliastra into a diocese, and assigned it as a suffragan of the archdiocese of Cagliari. The province of Ogliastra and thirty other country districts (pagi) were removed from the jurisdiction of the archdiocese of Cagliari. The territory assigned to the new diocese included the communes of: Tortolì, Ardali, Arzana, Barì, Baunei, Elini, Esterzili, Gairo, Girasol, Iersu, Ilbono, Lanusei, Loceri, Lozzorai, Osini, Perdasdefogu, Sadali, Scalaplano, Seui, Seulo, Talana, Tertenia, Triei, Ulassai, Ursulei, Ussassai, Villagrande Strisaili, Villanova Strisaili, and Villa-putzu. The town of Tortolì was promoted to the status of an episcopal city.

The cathedral of the diocese of Ogliastra was to be the parish church of S. Andrea Apostolo. It was to be serviced and administered by a corporation called the Chapter, which was to consist of an Archpriest, six canons, and six beneficiarii. One of the canons was to be the Theologus, another the Penitentiarius. In accordance with the decrees of the Council of Trent, the bishop was to erect a seminary for youth.

The right of presentation (nomination) of a candidate for a vacancy of the episcopal throne was vested in the king of Sardinia.The Capuchin Serafino Carchero was its first bishop. He had been Provincial of the Capuchins of Sardinia, based in Sassari. An earlier plan for Ogliastra had been for the appointment of Carchero as an auxiliary bishop for the archdiocese of Cagliari, with jurisdiction over the semi-independent province of Ogliastra. The papacy rejected that plan.

Tortoli, the episcopal seat, was in the district of Lanusei. In c. 1910, the town had a population of about 2,200, and the diocese around 54,500. In 2025, the town's inhabitants numbered 10,980.

=== Move to Lanusei ===
The climate of Tortolì was unfortunately not attractive. The city sat at the coast, at the end of an alluvial plain, crossed by several streams and with a stagnant lagoon to the north. Malaria was a constant threat. The heat and the humidity were oppressive much of the year. The royal government had recently moved its operations to the more elevated Lanusei, situated above 2000 ft.

The seat of the bishops of Ogliastra was moved from Tortoli to Lanusei on 5 June 1927, by Pope Pius XI, through the bull "Supremi pastoralis officii." The transfer included the cathedral Chapter, the minor beneficiaries, and the seminary. The church of S. Maria Maddalena was designated the new cathedral, to which the canons of the Chapter were attached. The archpriest was to head the Chapter, and was to be responsible for the cathedral parish. On this one occasion, the parish priest of S. Maria Maddalena was appointed Archpriest by the pope. The parish priests of S. Andrea in Tortoli, once the seat of the bishops, to compensate their loss were granted the honor of a canonicate in Lanusei. In 2019, the Chapter had an archpriest, three canons, and four honorary canons.

Bishop Serafino Carchero established the first seminary, which opened in 1831. His transfer to Ozieri, followed by a four-year vacancy, problems with finance, and the inhospitable malarial climate, brought the first experiment to an end. His successor, Giorgio Manurrita, favored moving the seminary to Lanusei, but it was not until 1927 that permission was granted by the Vatican. The Regional Seminary of the Sacred Heart was located in Cuglieri; it is now located in Cagliari.

In accordance with the practice which had developed, that dioceses should be named after the city in which the episcopal seat was located, the Congregation for Bishops, with the permission of Pope John Paul II granted on 27 September 1986, ordered the change in the vernacular name of the diocese of Ogliastra to the "diocese of Lanusei."

== Bishops of Ogliastra / Lanusei ==
- 1824–1834 : Serafino Carchero, O.F.M. Cap.

1834–1837 : Sede vacante

[1837–1838 : Vincenzo Foïs ]

- 1838-1844 : Giorgio Manurrita

1844–1848 : Sede vacante

- 1848–1851 : Michele Todde Valeri, Sch. P.

1851–1871 : Sede vacante

- 1871–1882 : Paolo Giuseppe Maria Serci Serra
- 1882–1893 : Antonio Maria Contini
- 1893–1899 : Salvatore Depau-Puddu
- 1900–1906 : Giuseppe Paderi
- 1910–1923 : Emanuele Virgilio
- 1923–1925 : Antonio Tommaso Videmari
- 1927–1936 : Giuseppe Miglior
- 1936–1970 : Lorenzo Basoli
- 1974–1981 : Salvatore Delogu
- 1981–2014 : Antioco Piseddu
- 2014–2019 : Antonio Mura
- 2020–pres. : Antonio Mura

== Sources ==
- Cappelletti, Giuseppe (1857). Le chiese d'Italia dalla loro origine sino ai nostri giorni (in Italian). Vol. decimoterzo (13). Venezia: Antonelli. pp. 101–108..
- Martini, Pietro (1841). Storia ecclesiastica di Sardegna. Volume 3 Cagliari: Stamperia Reale, 1841. (pp. 328-329).
- Ritzler, Remigius; Sefrin, Pirminus (1968). Hierarchia Catholica medii et recentioris aevi (in Latin). Vol. 7 (1800–1846). Monasterii: Libr. Regensburgiana.
- Ritzler, Remigius; Sefrin, Pirminus (1978). Hierarchia catholica Medii et recentioris aevi (in Latin). Vol. 8 (1846–1903). Il Messaggero di S. Antonio.
- Pięta, Zenon (2002). Hierarchia catholica medii et recentioris aevi (in Latin). Vol. 9 (1903–1922). Padua: Messagero di San Antonio. ISBN 978-88-250-1000-8.
- Sari, Aldo & Antioco Piseddu (1998). Chiese e arte sacra in Sardegna: Diocesi di Lanusei. (in Italian). Cagliari: Zonza, 1998.

=== External links ===
- Acta Apostolicae Sedis (index)
- David M. Cheney, Catholic-Hierarchy.org, "Diocese of Lanusei". Retrieved 29 February 2016.
- Gabriel Chow, GCatholic.org, "Diocese of Lanusei". Accessed 27 February 2024.
