= Roman Catholic Diocese of Suelli =

Latin Catholic diocese in Italy

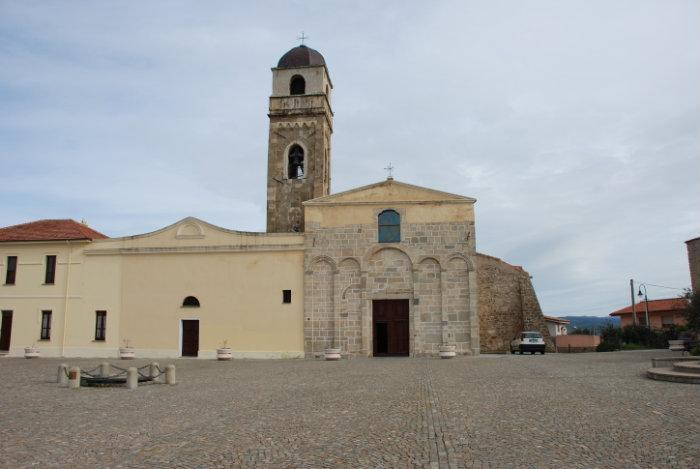
Suelli, San Pietro

The Diocese of Suelli (Latin: Dioecesis Suellitana) was a Roman Catholic diocese, whose episcopal seat was located in the town of Suelli in the Province of Cagliari in the Italian region Sardinia. Established in the 12th century, it was a suffragan (subordinate) of the metropolitan of Cagliari). In 1420, Pope Martin V made the archbishops of Cagliari bishops of Suelli as well.

== History ==
Suelli (or Barbaria) is mentioned as a suffragan of Cagliari in the Liber Censuum of the late 12th century.

The cathedral in Suelli was dedicated to Saint Peter, and later had the dedication to S. Georgius added. It was served and administered by a Chapter, composed of an Archpriest and seven canons.

The Bishop of Suelli attended the funeral of the widow of the Infante Ramon Berenguer, Conte de Ampurias, in Barcelona on 9 February 1374. King Peter IV had been present, and on 27 November 1375, he wrote to Bishop Peter of Suelli, acknowledging that, due to the rebellion of the Sardinians against the Crown of Aragon, the bishop had been forced to flee his diocese, and since the beginning of the rebellion had been unable to collect the money due him from his diocese. He authorized the bishop to take up residence in the royal Castro Callari (Torre de Cagliari), and to receive a stipend during the duration of the war on the same terms as the bishop of Terralba. The area of the Torre de Cagliari also included the cathedral of S. Maria Assunta and the archbishop's palace. Both edifices were used from time to time for important functions of the Chapter of Suelli.

=== Western schism ===
Following the disruptive papal conclaves of 1378, the first of which was beset with fear and violence, governments had to choose which of the claimants to the papal throne they would support. King Peter IV of Aragon and Sardinia (1336–1387) chose to support neither claimant, stating that he was "indifferent." His uncertainty provided a legal pretext for sequestering the ecclesiastical funds due the papacy in the territories of the kingdom of Aragon, which were then used to finance royal projects, notably the rebellion in Sardinia. His successors, John I (1387–1396) and Martin I (1396–1410), however, under the influence of the Cardinal of Aragon, Pedro de Luna, openly supported the Avignon Papacy; and when Pedro de Luna became Benedict XIII in 1394, he enjoyed the full support of the kings in governing the Church in Sardinia.

On 12 February 1420, Pope Martin V united the diocese of Suelli with the archdiocese of Cagliari, aeque personaliter.

== Bishops of Suelli ==
- (11th cent.) : Georgius
- (c. 1111/12) : Iohannes
- (c. 1114/1130) : Pietro Pintori
- (c. 1150/1163) : Pietro Macis
- (c. 1200/1212) : Paulus
- (c. 1215–1217) : Torchitorius
- (c. 1225–1237) : Cherchi, Cerchis)
- (c. 1240) :Alberto ?
- (1263) : Ignotus
- (1304) : Ignotus
- ( ? – ? ) : Cuxo
- (1344) : Michele di Fraga, O.P.
- ( ? -1349) : Pietro
- (1349–1353) : Guglielmo Kos (Ros), O.P.
- (1353–1363) : Guglielmo Domenico, O.P.
- (1363) : Pietro
- (c. 1368) : Giacomo
- (1374–c. 1380) : Pietro
- (1384–1399) : Jacopo Ayas, O.P., Avignon Obedience
- (1380–1386) : Jacopo di Malzia, O.F.M. Roman Obedience
- ( ? – ? ) : Benedetto di Ascoli, Roman Obedience
- (1386–1389) : Jacopo Scutiferi, O.E.S.A., Roman Obedience
- (1389) : Domenico Roman Obedience
- [ (1397) : Simon Margens of Orvieto, Roman Obedience ]
- (1399–1409) : Pietro Gilbert, O.P., Avignon Obedience

[ (c. 1408–1412) : Elia, O.F.M. ], Avignon Obedience

- (1409–1420) : Geraldo Vermell, Avignon Obedience

=== Titular Bishops ===
- (1969–1995) : Leo Joseph Brust
- (1996–2004) : Alberto Tanasini
- (2004–2006) : Ramón Castro Castro
- (2006–2009) : Ansgar (Óscar) Vicente Ojea
- (2013–pres.) : Brian Ngozi Udaigwe

== See also ==
- Archdiocese of Cagliari
- Catholic Church in Italy

== Sources ==
=== Episcopal lists ===
- Eubel, Conradus, ed. (1913). Hierarchia catholica (in Latin). Vol. 1 (Tomus 1) (second ed.). Münster: Libreria Regensbergiana. p. 467.. Archived.
- Gams, Pius Bonifatius (1873). Series episcoporum Ecclesiae catholicae: quotquot innotuerunt a beato Petro apostolo. Ratisbon: Typis et Sumptibus Georgii Josephi Manz. pp. 841-842. (Use with caution; obsolete)

=== Studies ===
- Cannas, Vincenzo Mario (1976). San Giorgio di Suelli, primo vescovo della Barbagia Orientale. (in Italian). Cagliari: Editrice sarda Fossataro 1976.
- Cannas, Vincenzo Mario (1981). La Chiesa Barbariense. Dalla fondazione alla soppressione (sec. XI-XV). (in Italian). Sassari: E. Gasperini 1981.
- Cappelletti, Giuseppe (1857). Le chiese d'Italia dalla loro origine sino ai nostri giorni (in Italian). Vol. decimoterzo (13). Venezia: Antonelli. pp. 79–81, 101–108..
- Forci, Antonio & Sailis, Sergio (2019). "Capitolo, vescovi, e vicari della Chiesa di Suelli all'epoca de Grande Scisma (1378-1417)," (in Italian), in: Studi Ogliastrini vol. 15 (2019), pp. 12-46.
- Kehr, Paul Fridolin. Italia Pontificia (in Latin), Vol. X: Calabria – Insulae (Turici: Weidmann 1975). (p. 418).
- Martini, Pietro (1841). Storia ecclesiastica di Sardegna. Volume 3 Cagliari: Stamperia Reale, 1841. (pp. 327-329)
- Mattei, Antonio Felice (1758). Sardinia sacra, seu De episcopis Sardis historia nunc primò confecta a F. Antonio Felice Matthaejo. (in Latin). Romae: ex typographia Joannis Zempel apud Montem Jordanum, 1758. Pp. 120-125.
- Piseddu, Antioco (1998). San Giorgio di Suelli vescovo dell’Ogliastra nei più antichi documenti. (in Italian). Dorgali 1998.
- Tola, Pasquale (1861). Codex diplomaticus Sardiniae, (in Latin) Vol. 1. Torino: e regia Typographeo 1861.
- Tronci, Bruno (2017). Una diocesi medievale nella Barbaria sarda. Storia e testimonianze materiali della Sede episcopale di Suelli. (in Italian). Dissertation: Univ. degli studi di Cagliari 2016/2017.
- Zedda, Corrado (2017). “I giudici cagliaritani, la diffusione del culto di San Giorgio e la nascita della diocesi di Barbaria/Suelli” (in Italian), in: "Studi Ogliastrini", 13 (Lanusei 2017), pp. 193-220.
- Zedda, Corrado (2018). “La diocesi di suelli agli inizi del xiv secolo e gli ultimi riflessi della lotta per la libertas ecclesiae.” (in Italian), in: Studi Ogliastrini vol. 14 (Lanusei 2018), pp. 29-34.

==== External links ====
- Acta Apostolicae Sedis (index)
