= Luigi Bettazzi =

Italian Catholic bishop (1923–2023)

His Excellency Luigi Bettazzi
- Bishop Emeritus of Ivrea
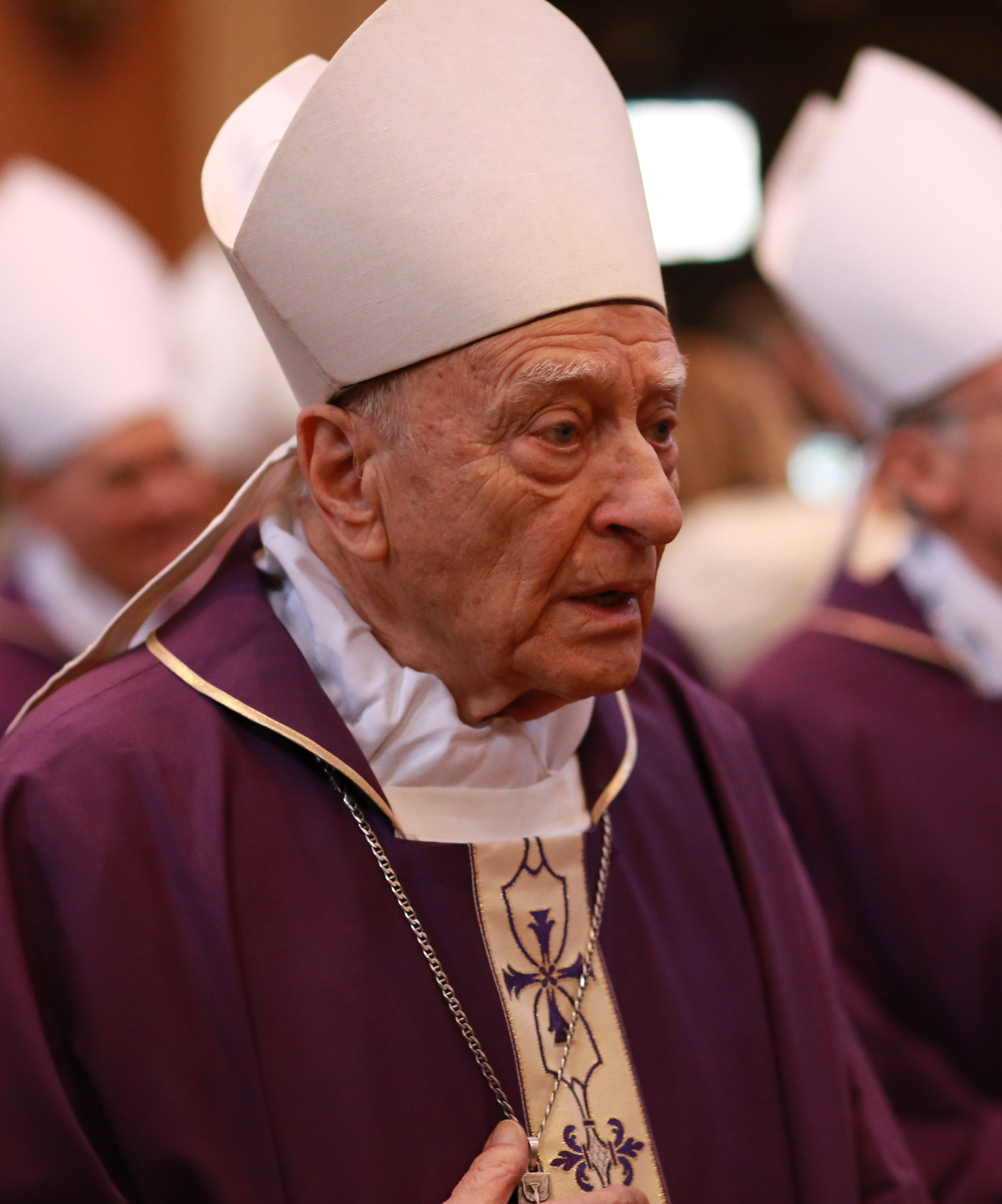
- Bettazzi in 2015
- Archdiocese: Turin
- Appointed: 26 November 1966
- Term ended: 20 February 1999
- Predecessor: Albino Mensa
- Successor: Arrigo Miglio
- Previous posts: Auxiliary Bishop of Bologna and Titular Bishop of Thagaste (1963–1966)

Orders
- Ordination: 4 August 1946 by Giovanni Nasalli Rocca di Corneliano
- Consecration: 4 October 1963 by Giacomo Lercaro

Personal details
- Born: 26 November 1923 Treviso, Italy
- Died: 16 July 2023 (aged 99) Albiano d'Ivrea, Italy

Styles of Luigi Bettazzi
- Reference style: His Excellency; The Most Reverend
- Spoken style: Your Excellency
- Religious style: Bishop

Luigi Bettazzi (26 November 1923 – 16 July 2023) was an Italian prelate of the Catholic Church who was bishop of Ivrea from 1966 to 1999. One of the youngest and most junior participants in the Second Vatican Council, he was one of the original signatories of the Pact of the Catacombs.

== Early life ==
Bettazzi was born on 26 November 1923 in Treviso, the third of seven children; his father was an engineer in Turin. He entered the minor seminary before he was ten years old and then studied philosophy and theology at the Gregorian University in Rome before earning a degree in philosophy at the University of Bologna. He was ordained a priest on 4 August 1946 by Giovanni Cardinal Nasalli Rocca di Corneliano of Bologna. He taught at the seminary in Bologna.

== Bishop ==
Pope Paul VI named him an auxiliary bishop of the Archdiocese of Bologna and titular bishop of Thagaste on 10 August 1963. He became vicar general of the Archdiocese of Bologna on 1 September 1963 and received his episcopal consecration on 4 October 1963 from Giacomo Cardinal Lercaro of Bologna, who was one of the four bishops who served as moderators of the Second Vatican Council.

Bettazzi was the most recently created bishop of the Catholic Church and one of the youngest bishops when, on 11 October 1963, he spoke at the second session of the Second Vatican Council on the subject of collegiality. In 2012 he explained his view of the subject: "Once they are consecrated, bishops share with the pope a responsibility for the whole church. This has a rock-solid theological tradition that is often ignored. Collegiality can make the papacy more efficacious rather than weaken it. Papal decisions would be more acceptable if more participation by fellow bishops was involved." Yves Congar described Bettazzi's contributions to the debate as "given at great speed and with fire", calling for clearly expressing "the idea that consecration confers all the powers and that it brings the bishop into the episcopal body" or collegium and does not depend upon any papal action. It met with applause.

On 16 November 1965, he joined 41 other bishops in signing the Pact of the Catacombs, promising in "housing, food and means of transportation to live in accordance with the ordinary manner of our people" and to "renounce forever wealth and the appearance thereof". More than 500 of their peers soon joined them. Bettazzi nevertheless lived in the bishop's residence in Ivrea but never wore the ring Pope Paul VI gave to each Council participant, calling it "ostentatious".

Bettazzi was made bishop of Ivrea in 1966. He was president of the Italian branch of Pax Christi from 1968 to 1975 and served as president of Pax Christi International from 1978 to 1985, accepting for the organization at the end of his term UNESCO's Peace Education prize. He retired from his position in Ivrea upon the appointment of his successor on 20 February 1999.

== Retirement and death ==
In retirement he expressed his view of what the Council represented: "The council endorsed continuity with the basic doctrines of the church but also meant pastoral discontinuity—adoption of new approaches for new circumstances. The anxiety over doctrinal integrity has produced half-heartedness about pastoral initiatives." Having known Pope Benedict XVI since the 1960s, he thought his resignation possible a year before it occurred, saying "I wish him a long life and lasting lucidity but I think that, if the moment arrives when he sees that things are changing, I think he has the courage to resign."

In 2007 he endorsed a proposal of the Italian government to establish legal recognition for same-sex relationships called civil unions. Speaking of homosexuality in April 2015, he said that "the question of sex must be studied, emancipating ourselves from the neo-Platonists who identified sex with spiritual decadence. Why not an expression of the human spirit?"

Bettazzi was made an honorary citizen of Bologna in 2016. Bettazzi was the last living of the original signatories to the signed Pact of the Catacombs. He was also the last surviving Italian bishop who participated in the Second Vatican Council. In retirement, he lived in Bologna. Bettazzi died in Albiano d'Ivrea on 16 July 2023, at age 99.

Catholic Church titles
Preceded by Albino Mensa	Bishop of Ivrea; 1966–1999	Succeeded by Arrigo Miglio
Preceded by —	Auxiliary Bishop of Bologna; 1963–1966	Succeeded by —
Preceded by Gilberto Baroni	Titular Bishop of Thagaste; 1963–1966	Succeeded by Antonio Mauro
