= Oblates of Saints Ambrose and Charles =

Ambrosian Catholic organisation

The Oblates of Saints Ambrose and Charles (Latin: Congregatio Oblatorum Sanctorum Ambrosii et Caroli) is an Ambrosian association of lay people and secular clergy in the Archdiocese of Milan. Its members use the suffix 'O.SS.C.A'. It was originally based in San Sepolcro, Milan, but in 1928 moved to its present base on via Settala.

Their spirituality does not belong to any particular school, but has strong elements of the Ignatian - part of their charism is to maintain a spirituality whose marks are belonging to the diocesan clergy, obedience to the bishop and safeguarding elements of the Ambrosian Rite.

== History ==
It was founded as the Oblates of St Ambrose in Milan in 1578 by archbishop Carlo Borromeo, inspired by the Oratorians, although he had begun preparing for the establishment of the association as early as 1570. Its initial members were diocesan priests who made a vow of particular obedience to their bishop and of stability (ie to stay in the institution), but no vow of poverty and no vow to live in community. This formed a body of well-trained and willing volunteer oblates who the bishop could use for emergencies and other difficult tasks, principally heading seminaries and carrying out popular missionary preaching. Its constitutions were elaborations on those of Agostino Valier and the Barnabite Carlo Bascapè, then bishop of Novara. After a trial period of two years and a commission called by Filippo Neri and Felice da Cantalice, the oblates' rule was promulgated on 13 September 1581.

It was renamed in 1611 by cardinal Federigo Borromeo, who added Carlo Borromeo's name to its title. Napoleon I suppressed it in 1810 and after his fall cardinal Carlo Gaetano Gaisruck opposed reviving it. It took until 1854 for the oblates to be restored by archbishop Carlo Bartolomeo Romilli.

== Structure ==
The Congregation is now organised into four groups or 'families'

- missionary oblates of Rho (17 members in 1980) - set up in 1714 by Giorgio Maria Martinelli; specifically dedicated to preaching spiritual exercises, retreats and popular missions; has included cardinals Angelo Ramazzotti and Eugenio Tosi and archbishop Ernesto Maria Piovella
- vicar oblates (24 members in 1980) - founded in 1875 to fill vacant parishes; approved on 24 January 1908 by Andrea Carlo Ferrari, who added the secondary purpose of managing shrines in the diocese
- diocesan oblates (largest group; around 160 members in 1980) - office priests, mostly stable posts in the diocese such as parish priests and teachers; put in charge of diocesan seminaries and colleges by cardinal Alfredo Ildefonso Schuster in 1931; reformed by archbishop Giovan Battista Montini in 1956
- lay oblates or 'oblatini' (around 60 members in 1980) - founded in 1932 by archbishop Schuster; take temporary vows of chastity and obedience; originally intended for administration, nursing and technical roles in seminaries and diocesan institutes; joined the diocese's missionary work after the Second Vatican Council; based in Seveso
