= Cagliari Cathedral =

Roman Catholic cathedral in Sardinia, Italy

Coordinates: 39°13′08″N 9°07′02″E

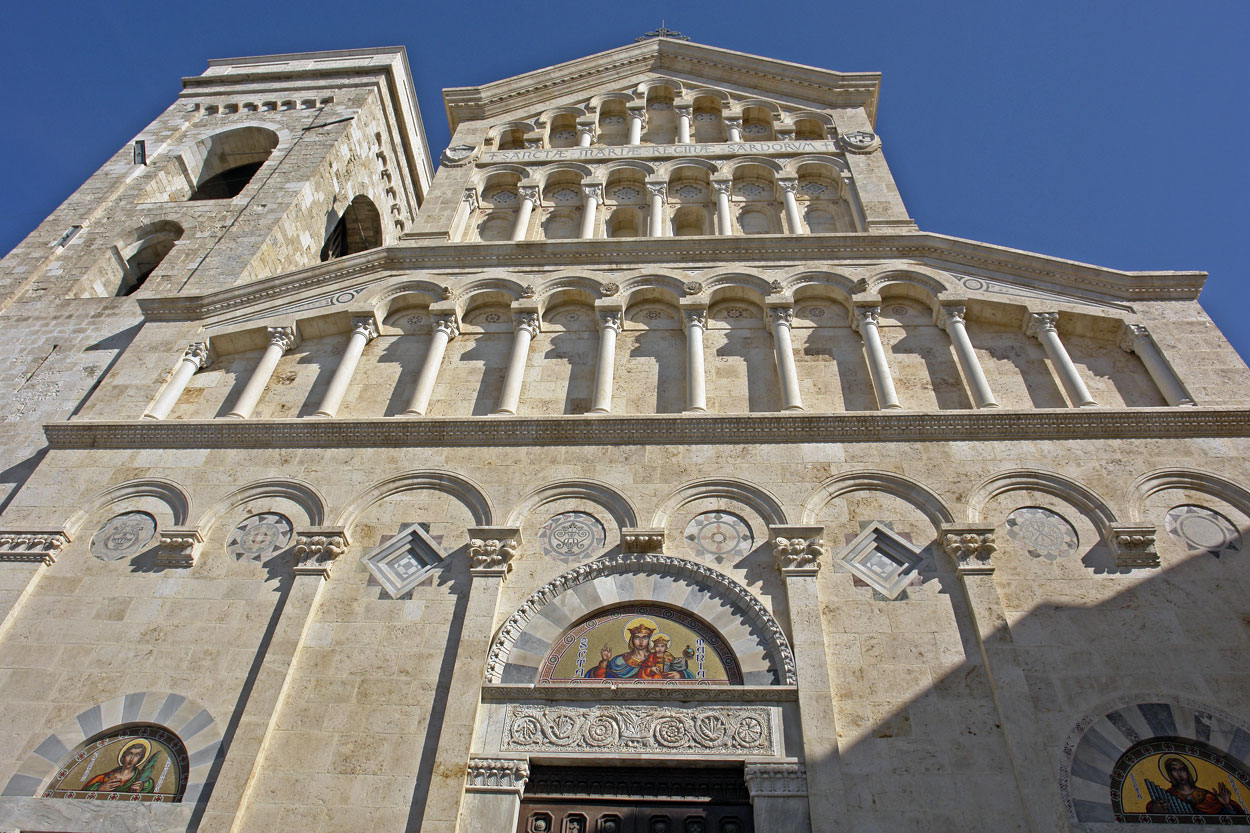
Neo-Romanesque façade

Cagliari Cathedral (Italian: Duomo di Cagliari, Cattedrale di Santa Maria e Santa Cecilia) is a Roman Catholic cathedral in Cagliari, Sardinia, Italy, dedicated to the Virgin Mary and to Saint Cecilia. It is the seat of the archbishop of Cagliari.

The church was built in the 13th century in Pisan-Romanesque style, obtaining cathedral status in 1258. In the 17th and 18th centuries it was renovated along Baroque lines. In the 1930s it finally received the current façade, in Neo-Romanesque style, inspired by Pisa Cathedral.

== History ==
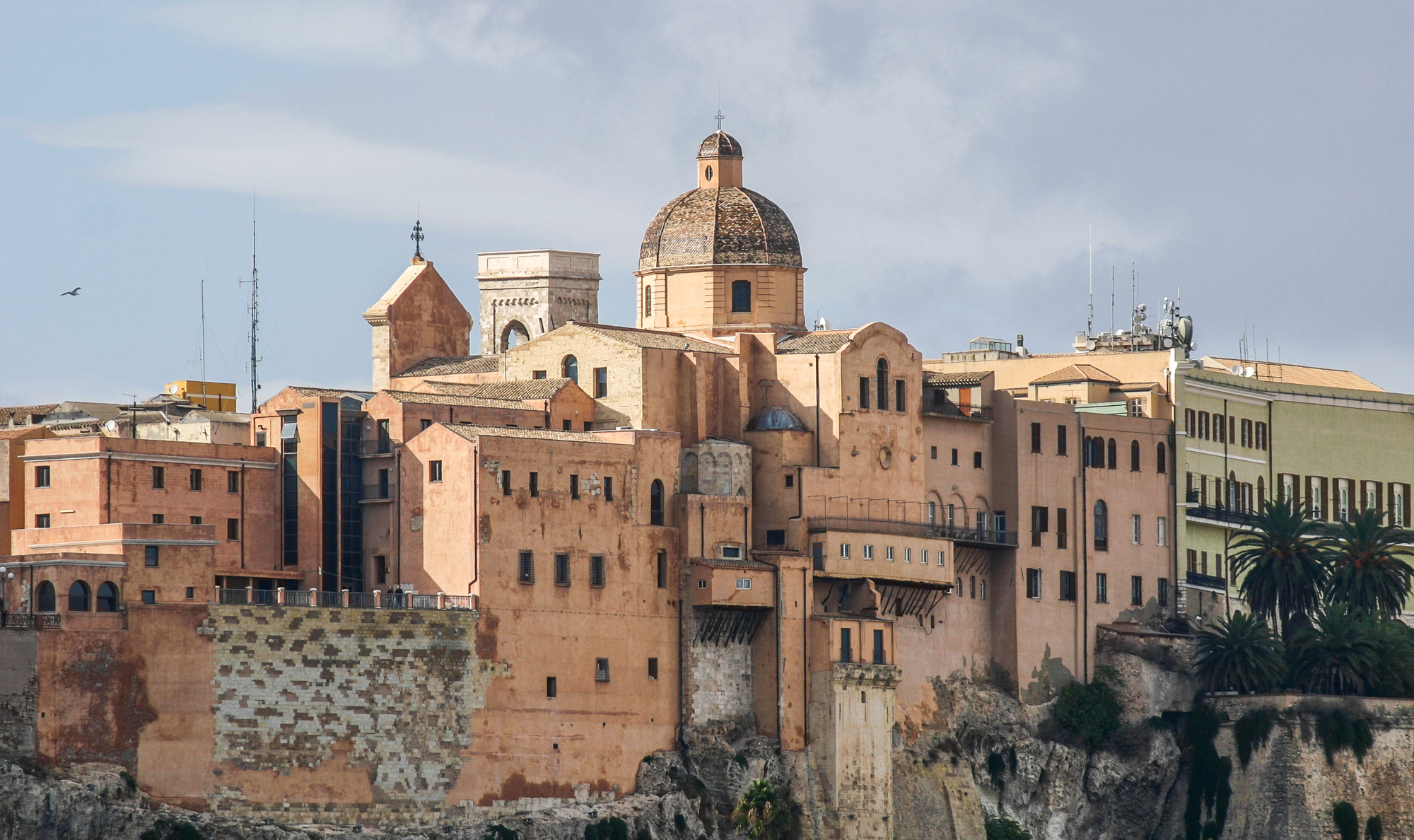
Eastern View of the Cathedral and Castello

The church was built by the Pisans in their stronghold overlooking the city, Castel di Castro. It has a square plan, with a nave and two aisles, the latter having cross vaults, while the nave had a wooden ceiling. In 1258, after the Pisans had destroyed the capital of the Giudicato of Cagliari, Santa Igia, and its cathedral, it became the seat of the diocese of Cagliari.

In the 14th century the transept was built, giving the cathedral a Latin cross groundplan, and the two side entrances. The façade received a Gothic mullioned window and the bell tower was also modified. From the same period the first chapel comes, in Italian Gothic style, in the transept's left arm. The right transept was completed after the conquest of Cagliari by the Aragonese, and two additional chapels were built.

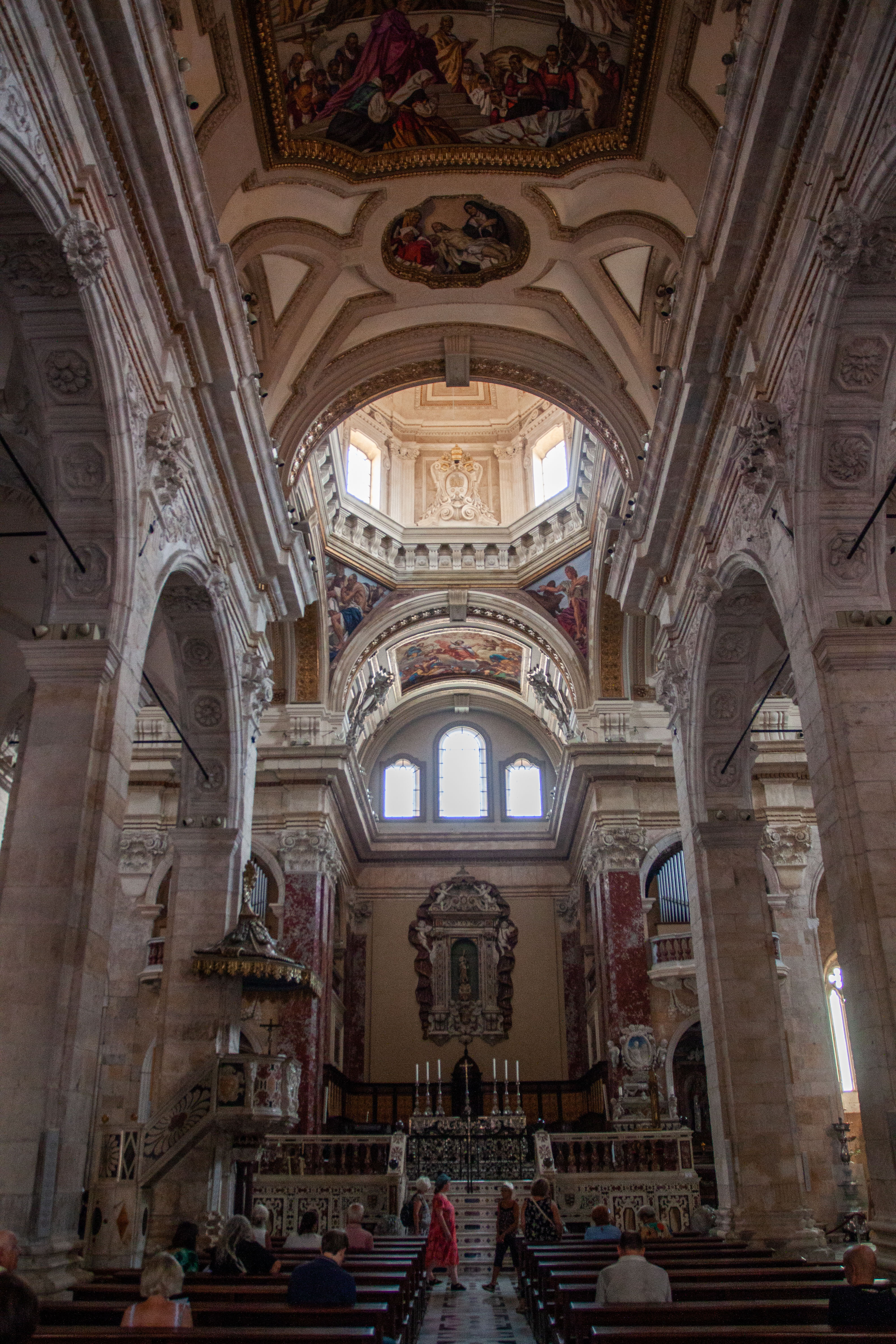
Interior

In 1618 the presbytery was elevated in order to build a sanctuary for several relics of martyrs. The interior and the façade were re-structured in Baroque style in 1669–1704. A cupola was built at the center of the transept, and the latter's Gothic chapels were removed.

The old façade was demolished in the early 20th century, and replaced by a Neo-Romanesque one, along the same lines of the original design, during the 1930s.

== Artworks ==
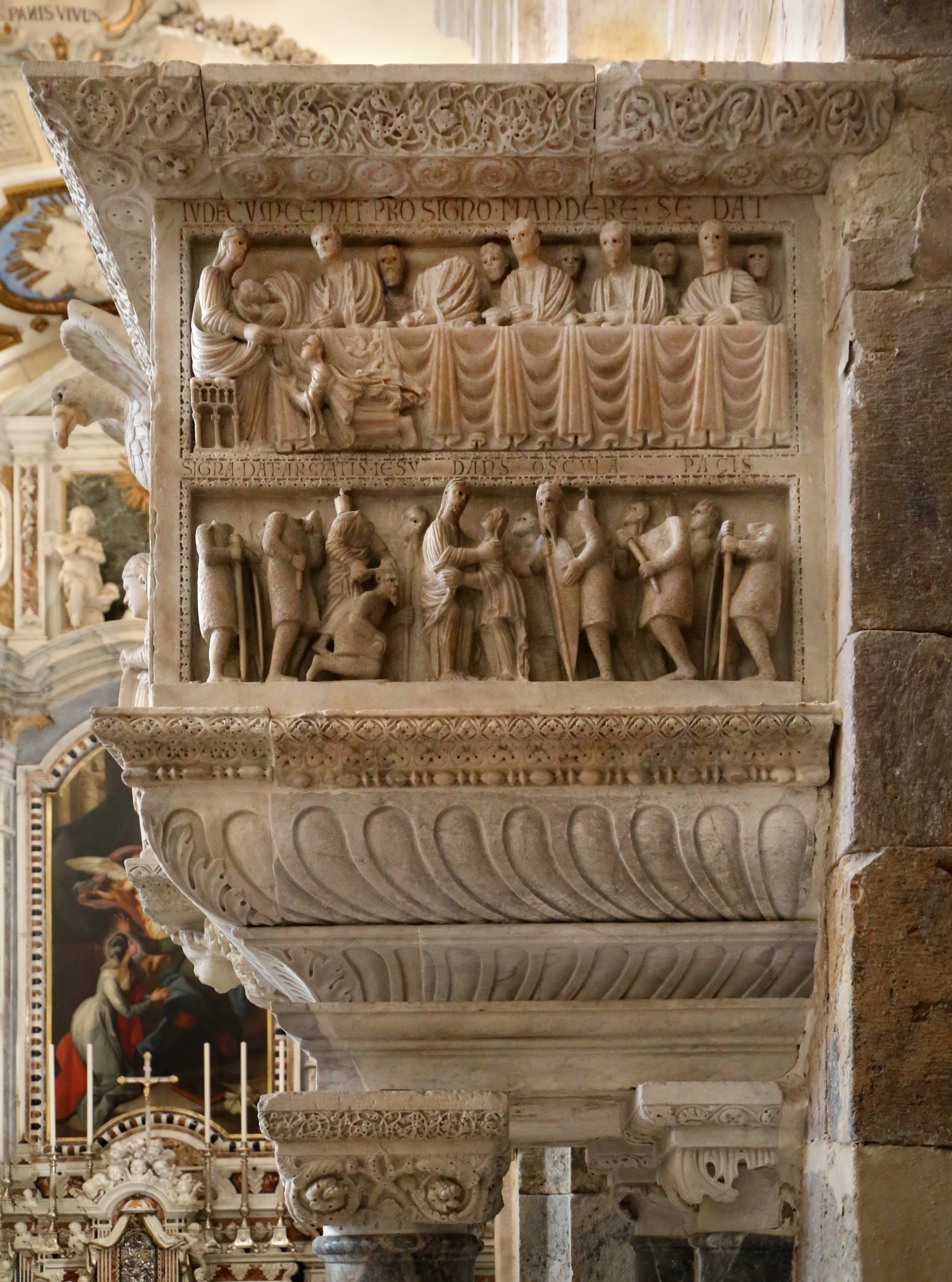
Ambo

In the interior, the main attraction is the ambo of Guglielmo, a 12th-century pair of pulpits by one Master Guglielmo, originally sculpted for the cathedral of Pisa. It was taken to Cagliari in 1312 and placed in the nave, near to its third column. In 1669 it was split in two, and the two pulpits placed in their current locations. The four marble lions which supported the ambo are now located at the feet of the presbytery balustrade. Sculptures include scenes from the New Testament.

Other artworks include a 15th-century Flemish triptych (also known as Triptych of Clement VII), attributed to Rogier van der Weyden, and the Baroque funerary monument to Bernardo de La Cabra, archbishop of Cagliari, who died in the plague of 1655, while the left transept houses a 14th-century chapel and the mausoleum of the Aragonese King Martin I of Sicily, built in 1676–1680. (Martin died during the conquest of Sardinia in the early 15th century).

In the crypt is the Sanctuary of the Martyrs, home to 179 niches containing relics of martyrs of Cagliari which were found during excavations in the 17th century near the Basilica of San Saturnino. The sanctuary has three chapels with Baroque decorations.

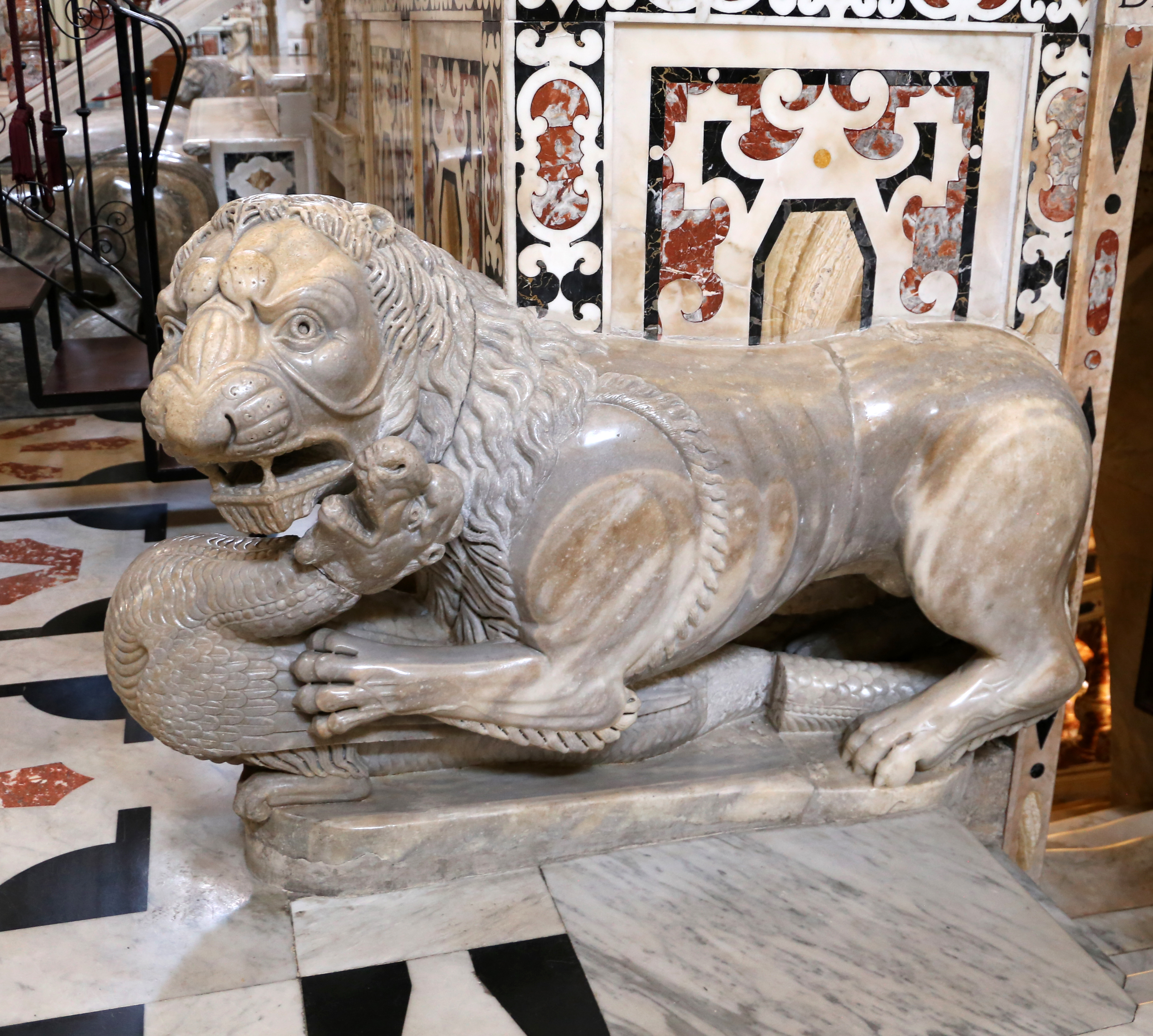
One of the four marble lions, once supporting the Ambo of Guglielmo, now located at the feet of the presbytery balustrade

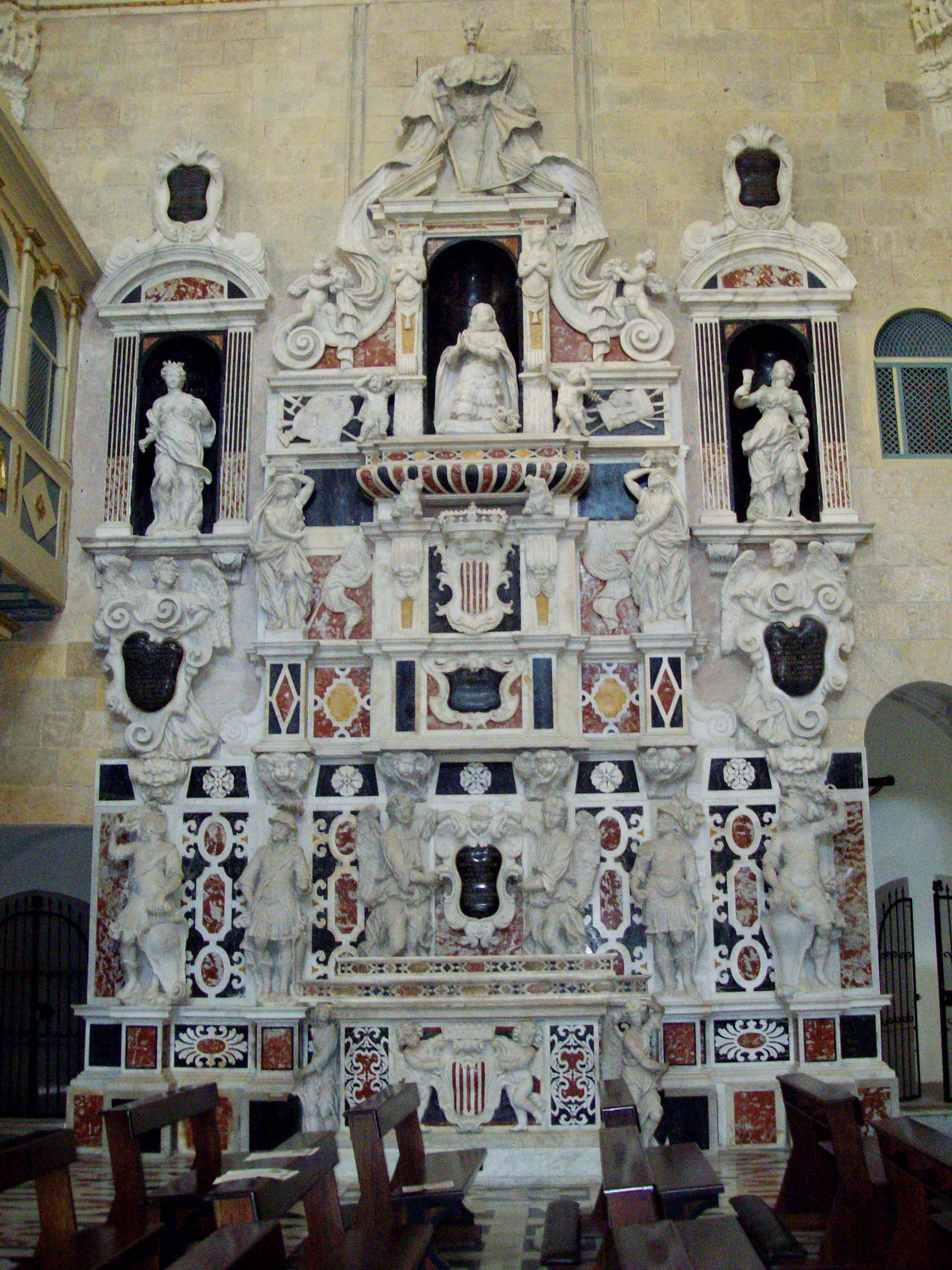
Mausoleum of Martin I of Sicily

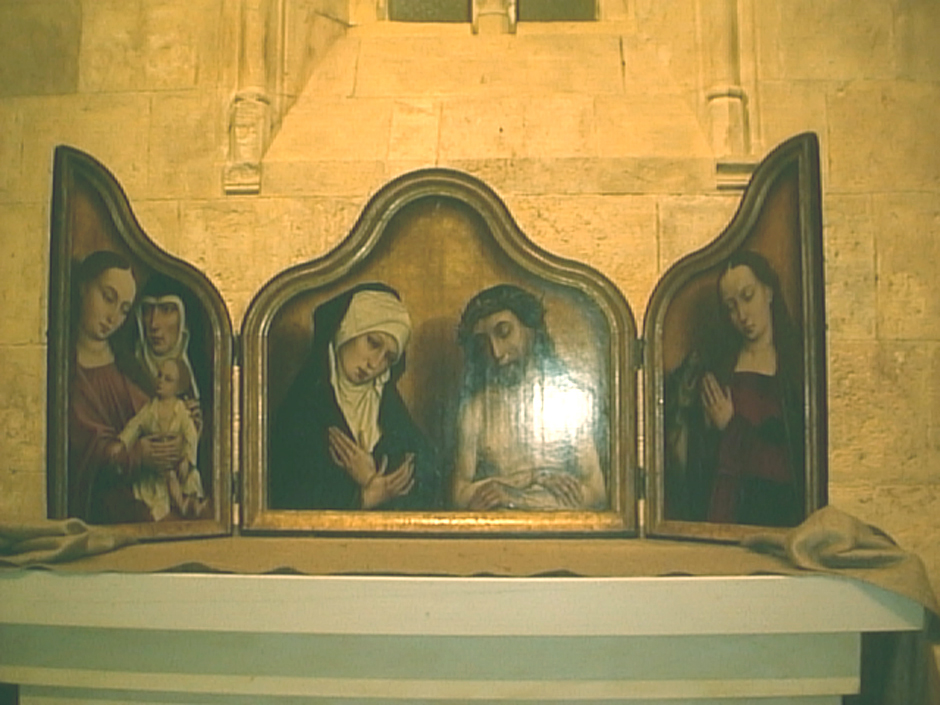
Triptych of Clement VII

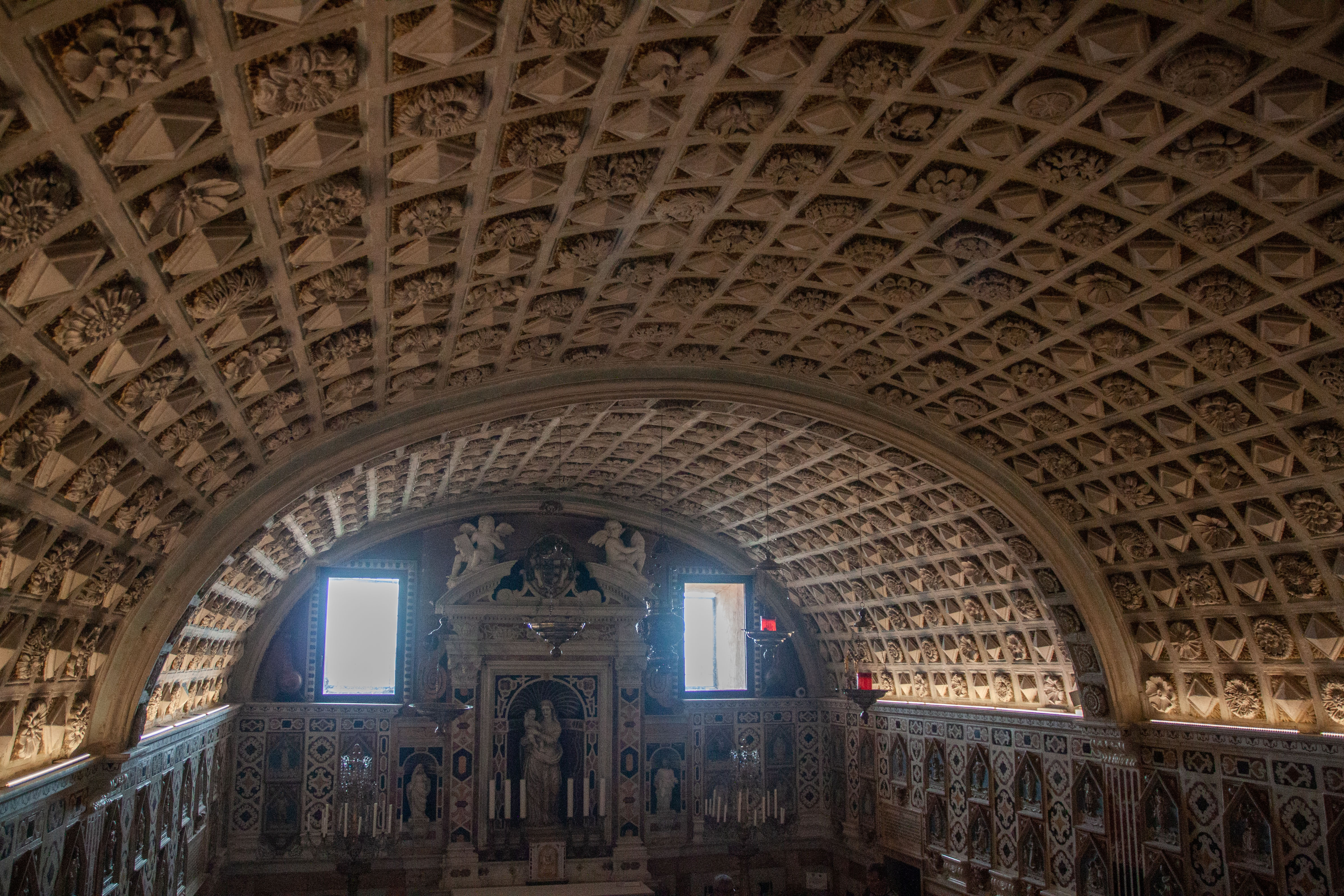
Crypt

== Sources ==
- Piseddu, Antioco (2000). Le chiese di Cagliari. Cagliari: Zonza Editori. ISBN 88-8470-030-2.
- Coroneo, Roberto (1993). Architettura Romanica dalla metà del Mille al primo '300. Nuoro: Ilisso. ISBN 88-85098-24-X.
