= Archdiocese of Cagliari =

Latin Catholic archdiocese in Italy

Coordinates: 39.2167°N 9.1167°E

Archdiocese of Cagliari Archidioecesis Calaritana Arcidiocesi di Cagliari

Catholic
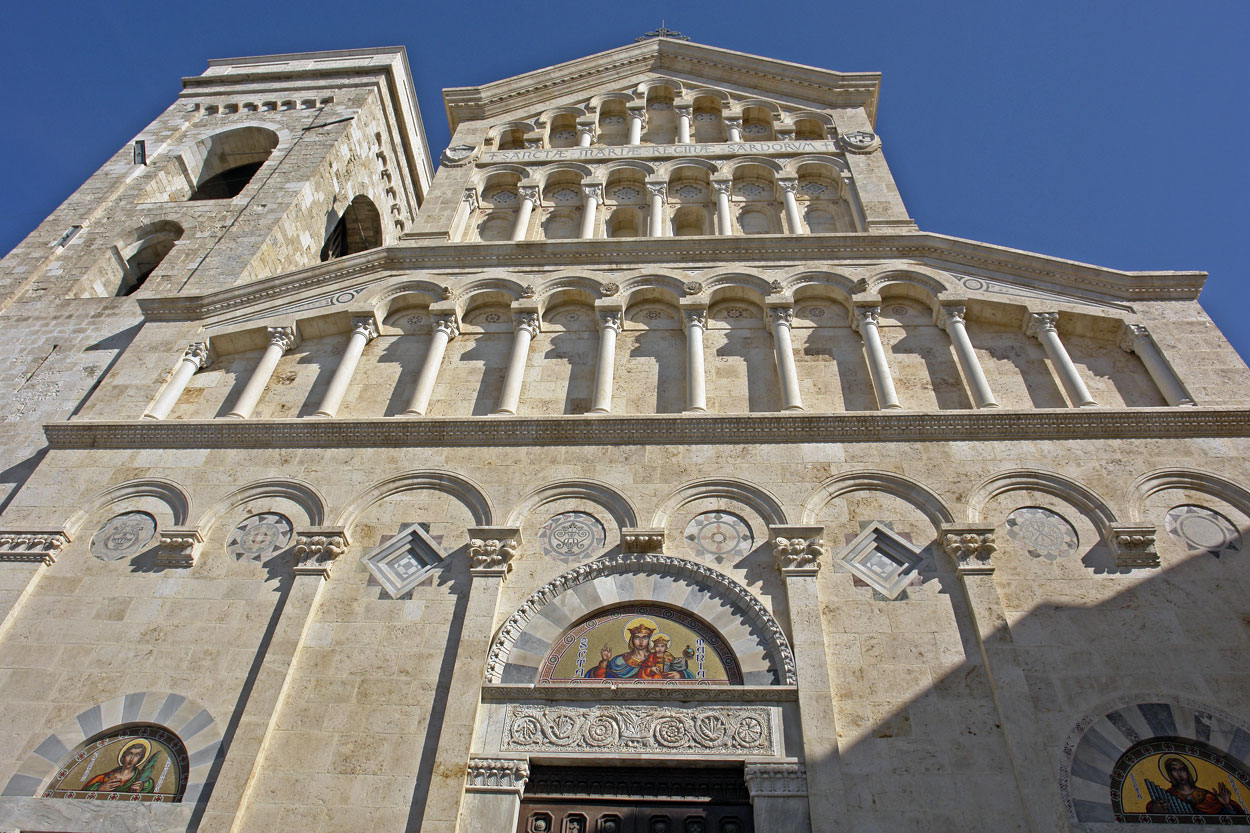
- Cagliari Cathedral

Location
- Country: Italy
- Ecclesiastical province: Cagliari

Statistics
- Area: 4,041 km^{2} (1,560 sq mi)
- Population: Total; Catholics: (as of 2023); 576,000 (est.) ▼; 563,000 (est.) ▲
- Parishes: 130 ▼

Information
- Denomination: Catholic Church
- Sui iuris church: Latin Church
- Rite: Roman Rite
- Established: 4th century
- Cathedral: Cattedrale di S. Maria di Castello
- Secular priests: 174 (diocesan) ▼135 (religious Orders) ▲41 Permanent Deacons ▼

Current leadership
- Pope: Leo XIV
- Archbishop: Giuseppe Baturi
- Suffragans: Diocese of Iglesias; Diocese of Lanusei; Diocese of Nuoro
- Bishops emeritus: Giuseppe Mani; Arrigo Miglio

Website
- www.chiesadicagliari.it

The Archdiocese of Cagliari (Latin: Archidioecesis Calaritana; Sardinian: Arcidiòtzesi de Casteddu) is a Latin archdiocese of the Catholic Church centred on the city of Cagliari. It holds the Primacy of Sardinia.

== History ==
Legend relates that a disciple of Jesus Christ, one Bonifatius, preached the Gospel in Cagliari in the 1st century. His body was said to have been found in the 17th century, with an inscription identifying it as Bonifacius. The inscription, however, is a forgery, as is the disciple himself.

There were probably bishops at Cagliari from an early date. Athanasius of Alexandria speaks of previous episcopal martyrs (during the Diocletian persecution most likely) in a letter to his contemporary, the first well-known bishop of Cagliari, Lucifer (c.354–370). Cagliari remained Roman Catholic despite the Arianism prevalent at the time and many African bishops fled the Arian Vandals to come to Cagliari.

In 626/627, Pope Honorius I summoned the bishop of Cagliari and some of his clergy to Rome, to discuss several pamphlets in circulation written against the bishop and clergy. Pope Martin I (649–653) suspended the privilege granted to the bishop of Cagliari to consecrate the bishop of Torres (Sassari). Pope John V (685-686) reasserted the pope's right to consecrate the bishop of Torres.

The earliest reference to the metropolitanate of Cagliari occurs in a letter of Pope Gregory I, dated July 599. The title "bishop" continues to be used.

At the time of the Second Council of Constantinople (681), Cagliari was already a metropolitan see. It has been suggested that in the 10th and 11th century as the giudicati of Sardinia became independent, the archbishop of Cagliari became the de facto theocratic ruler of the island through the Corona de Logu.

In 1075, Pope Gregory VII reproached Archbishop Giacomo for wearing a beard, a fashion which had been introduced into Sardinia at an earlier date; the pope asked the Judge Torchitorio I to oblige the clergy to abandon this custom.

=== Legateship and Primacy ===
Pope Urban II (1088–1099) granted the archbishops of Pisa the papal legateship over the Church in Sardinia. This was confirmed by Pope Innocent II in a bull of 22 April 1138. The grant was also confirmed by Pope Eugenius III on 19 May 1146; by Pope Anastasius IV (1153/1154); by Pope Adrian IV (1157); and by Pope Alexander III (1162).

On 22 April 1138, Pope Innocent II named Archbishop Baldwin of Pisa the metropolitan of the dioceses of Galtelli and Civita in Sardinia, and appointed him the primate over the province of Torres (Sassari). On 11 April 1176, Pope Alexander III confirmed for Archbishop Hubaldus of Pisa all the privileges granted to Archbishop Baldwin, and in addition to the primacy of Torres added the primacy of Cagliari and Arborea. These expanded privileges were confirmed by Lucius III in 1181, Urban III in 1186, Clement III in 1188, Celestine III in 1192, Innocent III in 1198, and Honorius III in 1216. Archbishop Federico Visconti of Pisa (1254–1277), totius Sardiniae primas, visited Sardinia, for the purpose of exercising his Primacy, legation and right of visitation. In 1409 the title of Primas was reassumed by the Archbishop of Cagliari, Antoninus Dexart, whence arose a controversy between those sees, which dragged on into the 20th century.

=== Territorial structure and changes ===
A memorandum in the Aragonese archives of the beginning of the 14th century details the ecclesiastical structure of the island. The archdiocese of Cagliari supervised the dioceses of Dolia, Sulcis, and Suelli "et est Pisanorum".

In 1420, territory was added from the suppressed Diocese of Suelli.

On 11 September 1495, Pope Alexander VI suppressed the diocese of Galtelli with the bull "Sacrosancta Romana Ecclesia", and its territory was united to the archdiocese of Cagliari.

In 1503, territory was added from the suppressed Diocese of Dolia.

By the end of the 15th century, the suffragan diocese of Sulcis was in trouble. The population of the town had nearly disappeared, and the bishop and cathedral canons had transferred their residences to Iglesias. This change was formalized by Pope Julius II in a bull of 8 December 1503. On 7 July 1503, Pope Alexander VI had appointed Giovanni Pilares bishop of Sulcis or Iglesias. Due to the shortage of funds, Pope Julius planned to unite the diocese with the archdiocese of Cagliari, when the see became vacant. Archbishop Pietro Pilares resigned the archbishopric on 9 January 1514, and Pope Leo X appointed Joannes Pilares his successor as archbishoip of Cagliari. Joannes was allowed to retain the diocese of Sulcis for life. That arrangement continued for more than two centuries, until Pope Clement XIII issued the bull "Universi Christiani Populi" on 25 June 1763, restoring the diocese of Sulcis under the title of Iglesias. Iglesias was appointed a suffragan of Cagliari.

Archbishop Francisco Esquivel (1605–1624) established the diocesan clerical seminary c. 1622.

On 8 November 1824, territory was removed from the archdiocese of Cagliari to form the Diocese of Ogliastra.

On 25 March 1926, Pope Pius XI appointed Cardinal Gaetano Bisleti his papal legate for the ceremonies of the rededication of the church of Our Lady de bono aere in Bono. The pope also sent a gold crown, with which the statue of the Virgin was to be crowned. On 25 April 1926, the church was declared a minor basilica.

Pope Paul VI became the first Pope to visit Sardinia in 1,650 years when he made his visit to Cagliari Cathedral, which is a minor basilica. Pope John Paul II paid a visit later. Pope Benedict XVI visited in September 2008 while Pope Francis visited in 2013.

== Bishops ==
=== Diocese of Cagliari ===
Latin Name: Calaritana
Erected: 4th Century ?

...

- Quintasius (314)

[ Protogenes ]

- Lucifer (by 354–370)

...

- Lucifer (484)

...

- ? Thomas (591)

Metropolitan

- Januarius (c. 591–603)
- Deodatus (d. 649)
- Justinus (649)
- Citonatus (c. 680–685)

...

- Thomas (787)

...

[ Arsenius (c. 843) Iconoclast]

- Joannes (c. 847–855)

...

- Citonatus (964)

...

- Umberto (1017–1040)
- Alfredus (before 1073)

=== Archdiocese of Cagliari ===
Elevated: 11th Century

- Jacobus (c. 1073 – after 1081)
- Lamberto (1089)
- Ugo (between 1089 and 1095)
- Benedictus (c. 1090–1100)
- Gualfredo (1112)
- Guglielmo (attested 1118/9)
- Pietro (1126)
- Constantinus (1141)

==== From 1198 to 1400 ====
- Riccus (c. 1198–1217)
- Marianus (1218– ? )
- Leonardus (c. 1233 – after 1255)
- Hugo
- Gallus (1276–1289)
- Percivallus (1290–1295)
- Giacomo de Abbate (1295–1299)
- Ranucio, O.F.M. Conv. (1299– )
- Joannellus ( ? – 1331)
- Gundisalvus Bonihominis (1331–1341)
- Guilelmus, O.Cist. (1341–1342)
- Sebastianus (1342–1344)
- Guilelmus, O.S.A. (1344–1348)
- Petrus, O.Cist. (1348–1352)
- Joannes Gratiani (1352–1354)
- Juan de Aragón, O.F.M. (1354–1369)
- Bernardus (1369–1386?)
- Diego (1386– ) Avignon Obedience
- Joannes Avignon Obedience

==== From 1400 to 1700 ====
- Antonius Dexart, O.Merc. (1403–1414) Avignon Obedience
- Petrus (1414–1423)
- Joannes Fabri, O.Carm. (1423–1440)
- Matthaeus Joffridi (1440–1449)
- Thomas (1449–1460)
- Francesco Ferrer (1460–1467)
- Ludovico Fenollet (1467–1471)
- Antonio Baragues, O.P. (1471)
- Gabriel Serra (1472–1484)
- Pietro Pilares, O.P. (1484–1513 Resigned)
- Juan Pilars (1514–1521)
- Jerónimo Vilanova (1521–1534)
- Domenico Pastorello, O.F.M. Conv. (1534–1547 Died)
- Baltasar de Heredia, O.P. (1548–1558 Resigned)
- Antonio Paragües Castillejo, O.S.B. (1558–1572)
- Francisco Pérez (1574–1577)
- Gaspar Vicente Novella (1578–1586)
- Francisco de Val (1587–1595)
- Alfonso Laso Sedeño (1596–1604)
- Francisco Esquivel (1605–1624)
- Lorenzo Nieto y Corrales Montero Nieto, O.S.B. (1625–1626)
- Ambrogio Machin, O. de M. (1627–1640)
- Bernardo Lacabra (1643–1655)
- Pietro de Vico (1657–1676)
- Diego Ventura Fernández de Angulo, O.F.M.Observ. (1676–1683)
- Antonio de Vergara, O.P. (1683–1685)
- Luis Díaz Aux de Armendáriz, O. de M. (1686–1689)
- Francesco di Sobre Casas, O.P. (1689–1698)

==== From 1700 to 1950 ====
- Bernardo di Cariñena Ipenza y Saulini, O. de M. (1699–1722)
- Giovanni Giuseppe Falletti (1726–1748)
- Giulio Cesare Gandolfi (1748–1758)
- Tommaso Natta, O.P. (1759–1763 Resigned)
- Giuseppe Agostino Delbecchi, Sch. P. (1763–1777)
- Vittorio Filippo Melano di Portula, O.P. (1778–1797)
- Diego Cadello (1798–1807)

Sede Vacante (1807–1819)

- Nicolo Navoni (1819–1836)
- Antonio Raimondo Tore (1837–1840)
- Giovanni Emanuele Marongiu Nurra (1842–1866)
- Giovanni Antonio Balma, O.M.V. (1871–1881)
- Vincenzo Gregorio Berchialla, O.M.V. (1881–1892)
- Paolo Giuseppe Maria Serci Serra (1893–1900)
- Pietro Balestra, O.F.M. Conv. (1900–1912)
- Francesco Rossi (1913–1919)
- Ernesto Maria Piovella, Obl. Rho (1920–1949)

==== Since 1949 ====
- Paolo Botto (1949–1969 Resigned)
- Sebastiano Baggio (1969–1973)
- Giuseppe Bonfigioli (1973–1984 Resigned)
- Giovanni Canestri (1984–1987)
- Ottorino Pietro Alberti (1987–2003 Retired)
- Giuseppe Mani (2003–2012 Retired)
- Arrigo Miglio (2012–2019 Retired)
- Giuseppe Baturi (2019-)

== Suffragan sees ==
- Iglesias
- Lanusei (until 1998 "Ogliastra")
- Nuoro

== See also ==
- History of Cagliari
- Timeline of Cagliari

== Sources ==
=== Lists of bishops ===
- Eubel, Conradus, ed. (1913). Hierarchia catholica (in Latin). Vol. 1 (Tomus 1) (second ed.). Münster: Libreria Regensbergiana. pp. 156–157.. Archived.
- Eubel, Conradus, ed. (1914). Hierarchia catholica (in Latin). Vol. 2 (Tomus 2) (second ed.). Münster: Libreria Regensbergiana. p. 114.. Archived.
- Eubel, Conradus, ed. (1923). Hierarchia catholica (in Latin). Vol. 3 (Tomus 3) (second ed.). Münster: Libreria Regensbergiana. p. 146.. Archived.
- Gams, Pius Bonifatius (1873). Series episcoporum Ecclesiae catholicae: quotquot innotuerunt a beato Petro apostolo. Ratisbon: Typis et Sumptibus Georgii Josephi Manz. pp. 834–835. (Use with caution; obsolete)
- Gauchat, Patritius (Patrice) (1935). Hierarchia catholica (in Latin). Vol. IV (1592-1667). Münster: Libraria Regensbergiana. p. 87.
- Ritzler, Remigius; Sefrin, Pirminus (1952). Hierarchia catholica medii et recentis aevi (in Latin). Vol. V (1667-1730). Patavii: Messagero di S. Antonio.
- Ritzler, Remigius; Sefrin, Pirminus (1958). Hierarchia catholica medii et recentis aevi (in Latin). Vol. 6 (1730-1799). Patavii: Messagero di S. Antonio.
- Ritzler, Remigius; Sefrin, Pirminus (1968). Hierarchia Catholica medii et recentioris aevi (in Latin). Vol. 7 (1800–1846). Monasterii: Libr. Regensburgiana.
- Ritzler, Remigius; Sefrin, Pirminus (1978). Hierarchia catholica Medii et recentioris aevi (in Latin). Vol. 8 (1846–1903). Il Messaggero di S. Antonio.
- Pięta, Zenon (2002). Hierarchia catholica medii et recentioris aevi (in Latin). Vol. 9 (1903–1922). Padua: Messagero di San Antonio. ISBN 978-88-250-1000-8.

=== Studies ===
- Cappelletti, Giuseppe (1857). Le chiese d'Italia dalla loro origine sino ai nostri giorni (in Italian). Vol. decimoterzo (13). Venezia: Antonelli. pp. 47–73..
- Kehr, Paul Fridolin. Italia Pontificia (in Latin), Vol. X: Calabria – Insulae (Turici: Weidmann 1975). (pp. 391–414).
- Lanzoni, Francesco (1927). Le diocesi d'Italia dalle origini al principio del secolo VII (an. 604), vol. II, Faenza 1927, pp. 658–667.
- Martini, Pietro (1841). Storia ecclesiastica di Sardegna. Volume 3 Cagliari: Stamperia Reale, 1841. (pp. 315-322)
- Mattei, Antonio Felice (1758). Sardinia sacra seu De episcopis Sardis historia nunc primò confecta a F. Antonio Felice Matthaejo. (in Latin). Romae: ex typographia Joannis Zempel apud Montem Jordanum, 1758. Pp. 66-110.
- Pintus, S. (1904). Sardinia sacra. Nuovo elenco storico-critico degli arcivescovi e vescovi di Sardegna con copiose notizie storiche biografiche. Vol. I. Provincia ecclesiastica di Cagliari. (in Italian). Iglesias 1904.
- Saba, A. (1929). Il pontificato romano e la Sardegna medioevale. (in Italian). Vol. I. Roma 1929.
- Serra, G. (1996). Il capitolo metropolitano di Cagliari: sua nascita, suo corso storico. (in Italian). Cagliari 1996.
- Sulis, Francesco (1881). Brevi cenni sulla istituzione, antichita ed eccellenza dell'archidiocesi di Cagliari. (in Italian). Cagliari 1881.
- Viridis, Francesco (2008). Gli arcivescovi di Cagliari: dal Concilio di Trento alla fine del dominio spagnolo. (in Italian). Ortacesus: Nuove Grafiche Puddu, 2008.
