= Giuseppe Baturi =

Italian Catholic bishop (b. 1964)

- Archbishop of Cagliari
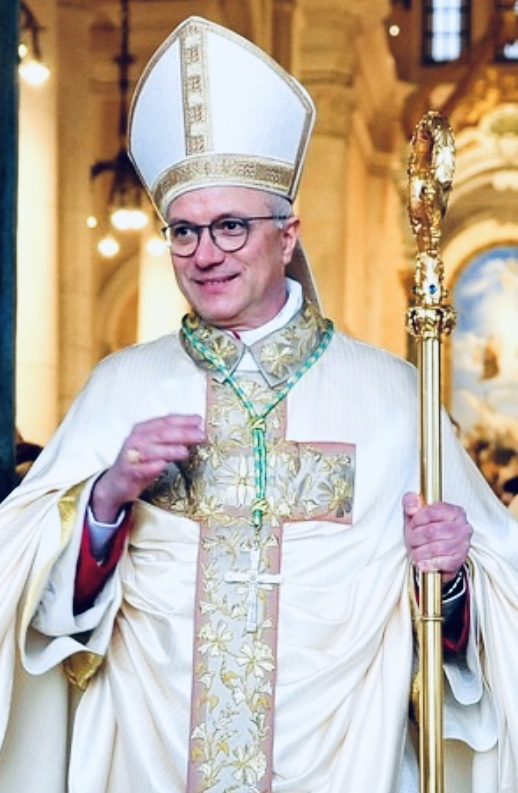
- Church: Catholic Church
- Archdiocese: Cagliari
- In office: 5 January 2020 – present
- Other posts: Secretary of the Episcopal Conference of Italy (2022–present); Grand Prior of the Italia Sardegna Lieutenancy of the Equestrian Order of the Holy Sepulchre

Orders
- Ordination: 2 January 1993 by Luigi Bommarito
- Consecration: 5 January 2020 by Gualtiero Bassetti

Personal details
- Born: Giuseppe Andrea Salvatore Baturi; 21 March 1964 (age 62) Catania, Italy
- Denomination: Catholic
- Education: University of Catania; Pontifical Gregorian University

Giuseppe Baturi (born 21 March 1964) is an Italian Catholic prelate who has served Archbishop of Cagliari since 2020 and as secretary of the Episcopal Conference of Italy since 2022.

== Biography ==
Giuseppe Andrea Salvatore Baturi was born in Catania on 21 March 1964. After completing high school, he obtained a law degree from the University of Catania. As a student of the Archepiscopal Seminary he earned a bachelor's degree in theology at the Theological Studio of San Paolo in Catania. He completed a licentiate in canon law at the Pontifical Gregorian University. He was ordained a priest of the Diocese of Catania on 2 January 1993 by Luigi Bommarito, Archbishop of Catania.

Baturi was parish priest of Valcorrente, a hamlet of Belpasso, from 1993 to 2002 and Diocesan Treasurer from 1999 to 2008. He was also the Episcopal Vicar for Economic Affairs, a member of the Presbyteral Council, General Procurator of the Archbishop, vice-president of the Catanese Opera for Worship and Religion, a member of the boards of directors of the Pious Work of Poor Clerics, of the Pious San Benedetto Educational Institute, and of the Regina Pacis Committee Association of Belpasso, and a member of the steering committee of the Michelangelo Virgilito Foundation of Palermo. He was also head of Communion and Liberation for Sicily. He became Canon Major of the Cathedral Chapter of Catania in 2012.

From 2012 to April 2019, he was director of the National Office for Legal Problems and secretary of the Council for Legal Affairs of the CEI. He became under-secretary of the CEI in 2015.

On 16 November 2019, Pope Francis appointed him archbishop of Cagliari. He received his episcopal consecration in the Shrine of Our Lady of Bonaria on 5 January 2020 from Cardinal Gualtiero Bassetti, Archbishop of Perugia. He was installed as bishop of Cagliari that same day. He received the pallium, the symbol of his status as a metropolitan, on 20 September from Archbishop Emil Paul Tscherrig, apostolic nuncio to Italy, in front of the cathedral on the Piazza Palazzo.

On 25 May 2021, he was elected vice president of the CEI for central Italy.

In March 2022 he met with the head of the Ukrainian community in Cagliari and in April 2022, he visited Ukraine to express his solidarity with his former schoolmate, Archbishop Mieczysław Mokrzycki of Lviv.

On 5 July 2022, Pope Francis named him secretary of the CEI. Baturi said he would continue to serve as archbishop of Cagliari.

Baturi is the Grand Prior of the Italia Sardegna Lieutenancy of the Equestrian Order of the Holy Sepulchre of Jerusalem.
