= List of cathedrals in Italy =

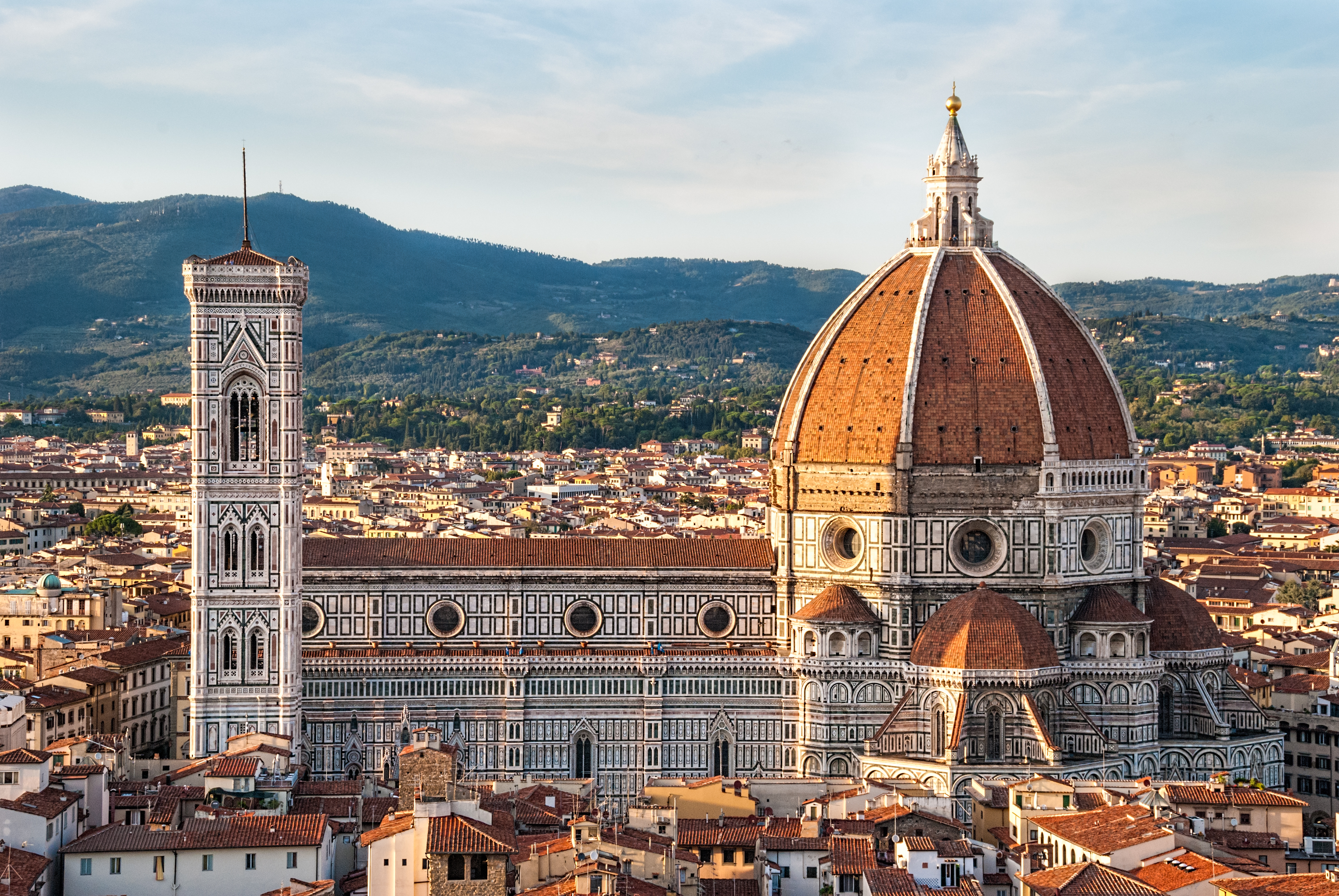
Florence Cathedral (Santa Maria del Fiore) by Filippo Brunelleschi, which has the largest brick dome in the world, and is considered a masterpiece of world architecture.

This is a list of cathedrals in Italy, including also Vatican City and San Marino. This is intended to be a complete list of extant cathedrals – i.e., churches that are the seats of bishops – and co-cathedrals. Many former cathedrals and proto-cathedrals are also included, but many more are yet to be added.

Almost all cathedrals in Italy are Latin Catholic, but any that are not are also listed here.

There are many churches in Italy commonly known as Duomo. This is often translated as "cathedral", but not entirely accurately: "duomo" refers to the principal church of a town or city, whatever its status. Clearly, when a cathedral exists, that will often also be a town's principal church, and many cathedrals are thus also "duomi", and vice versa. This is not always so, however: there are places where the cathedral and the principal church are not the same (Bologna, for example); and very many places which are not the seats of bishops have a non-episcopal "duomo" and no cathedral at all. In this list, churches known as "duomo" are only included if they are, or have been, episcopal seats, as above.

There is a very small number of churches, such as that at Monza, which have such exceptional distinction or status that they are comparable in importance to cathedrals without having ever been the seats of bishops, and are commonly known in English as cathedrals. There is a separate (incomplete) list for this small group of churches.

== List of cathedrals in Italy ==
Cathedral	Present Archdiocese or Diocese	Location	Dedication	Status	Notes
Acerenza Cathedral; Cattedrale dell’Assunzione della B. Maria Vergine e San Canio	Acerenza	Acerenza, Potenza, Basilicata	Assumption of the Blessed Virgin Mary and Saint Canius	cathedral, minor basilica	
Acerno Cathedral; Cattedrale di S. Donato	Salerno-Campagna-Acerno	Acerno, Salerno, Campania	Saint Donatus	co-cathedral	
Acerra Cathedral; Cattedrale di S. Maria Assunta	Acerra	Acerra, Naples, Campania	Assumption of the Blessed Virgin Mary	cathedral	
Acireale Cathedral; Cattedrale di Maria SS. Annunziata	Acireale	Acireale, Catania, Sicily	Annunciation of the Blessed Virgin Mary	cathedral, minor basilica	
Acquapendente Cathedral; Basilica Cattedrale di S. Sepolcro	Viterbo	Acquapendente, Viterbo, Lazio	Holy Sepulchre	co-cathedral, immemorial minor basilica	succeeded Castro Cathedral, destroyed 1649
Acquaviva Cathedral; Concattedrale di S. Eustachio	Altamura-Gravina-Acquaviva delle Fonti	Acquaviva delle Fonti, Bari, Apulia	Saint Eustace	co-cathedral	
Acqui Cathedral; Cattedrale di Nostra Signora Assunta	Acqui	Acqui Terme, Alessandria, Piedmont	Assumption of the Blessed Virgin Mary	cathedral	
Adria Cathedral (New Cathedral); Cattedrale di SS. Pietro e Paolo	Adria-Rovigo	Adria, Rovigo, Veneto	Saint Peter and Saint Paul	cathedral	built as new cathedral in early 19th century
Adria Old Cathedral; Cattedrale Vecchia di San Giovanni	Adria-Rovigo	Adria, Rovigo, Veneto	Saint John	former cathedral, parish church	cathedral to the early 19th century
Agrigento Cathedral; Cattedrale di S. Gerlando	Agrigento	Agrigento, Sicily	Assumption of the Blessed Virgin Mary; Saint Gerland	cathedral, minor basilica	
Alatri Cathedral; Basilica Concattedrale di S. Paolo Apostolo	Anagni-Alatri	Alatri, Frosinone, Lazio	Saint Paul	co-cathedral, minor basilica	
Alba Cathedral; Cattedrale di S. Lorenzo	Alba Pompeia	Alba, Cuneo, Piedmont	Saint Lawrence	cathedral	
Albano Cathedral; Basilica Cattedrale di S. Pancrazio Martire	Albano	Albano Laziale, Rome, Lazio	Saint Pancras, Saint John the Baptist	cathedral, minor basilica	
Albenga Cathedral; Cattedrale di S. Michele Arcangelo	Albenga-Imperia	Albenga, Savona, Liguria	Saint Michael	cathedral	
Ales Cathedral; Cattedrale di Ss. Pietro e Paolo	Ales-Terralba	Ales, Oristano, Sardinia	Saint Peter and Saint Paul	cathedral	
Alessandria Cathedral; Cattedrale di S. Pietro Apostolo	Alessandria della Paglia	Alessandria, Piedmont	Saint Peter and probably also Saint Mark	cathedral	
Alghero Cathedral; Cattedrale di Beata Maria Vergine Immaculata Concezione	Alghero-Bosa	Alghero, Sassari, Sardinia	Immaculate Conception	cathedral	
Alife Cathedral; Cattedrale di S. Maria Assunta	Alife-Caiazzo	Alife, Caserta, Campania	Assumption of the Blessed Virgin Mary (previously Saint Sixtus)	cathedral	
Altamura Cathedral; Cattedrale di S. Maria Assunta	Altamura-Gravina-Acquaviva delle Fonti	Altamura, Bari, Apulia	Assumption of the Blessed Virgin Mary	cathedral	
Amalfi Cathedral; Cattedrale di S. Andrea Apostolo	Amalfi-Cava de' Tirreni	Amalfi, Salerno, Campania	Saint Andrew	cathedral	
Amelia Cathedral; Concattedrale di S. Firmina	Terni-Narni-Amelia	Amelia, Terni, Umbria	Saint Firmina	co-cathedral	
Anagni Cathedral; Basilica Cattedrale di Maria SS.ma Annunziata	Anagni-Alatri	Anagni, Frosinone, Lazio	Annunciation of the Blessed Virgin Mary	cathedral, immemorial minor basilica	
Ancona Cathedral; Basilica Cattedrale di S. Ciriaco	Ancona-Osimo	Ancona, Marche	Saint Cyriacus	cathedral, minor basilica	
Andria Cathedral; Cattedrale di S. Maria Assunta	Andria	Andria, Bari, Apulia	Assumption of the Blessed Virgin Mary	cathedral	
Aosta Cathedral; Cattedrale di S. Giovanni Battista	Aosta	Aosta, Valle d’Aosta	Saint John the Baptist	cathedral	
Aquileia Cathedral; Basilica di S. Maria Assunta in Cielo e SS. Ermagora e Fortunato	Gorizia	Aquileia, Friuli-Venezia Giulia	Assumption of the Blessed Virgin Mary; Saints Hermagoras and Fortunatus	former cathedral, immemorial minor basilica; World Heritage Site	
Aquino Cathedral; Basilica Concattedrale di Ss. Costanzo e Tommaso d’Aquino	Sora-Aquino-Pontecorvo	Aquino, Frosinone, Lazio	Saint Constantius; Saint Thomas Aquinas	co-cathedral, minor basilica	
Arezzo Cathedral; Cattedrale di Ss. Donato e Pietro	Arezzo-Cortona-Sansepolcro	Arezzo, Tuscany	Saint Donatus and Saint Peter	cathedral	
Ariano Irpino Cathedral; Cattedrale di S. Maria Assunta	Ariano Irpino-Lacedonia	Ariano Irpino, Avellino, Campania	Assumption of the Blessed Virgin Mary; Saint Ottone Frangipane	cathedral, minor basilica	
Ascoli Piceno Cathedral; Basilica Cattedrale di S. Maria Madre di Dio, S. Emidio	Ascoli Piceno	Ascoli Piceno, Marche	Mary, Mother of God; Saint Emygdius	cathedral, minor basilica	
Ascoli Satriano Cathedral; Concattedrale della Natività della Beata V. Maria	Cerignola-Ascoli Satriano	Ascoli Satriano, Foggia, Apulia	Nativity of the Blessed Virgin Mary	co-cathedral	
Assisi Cathedral; Cattedrale di S. Rufino	Assisi-Nocera Umbra-Gualdo Tadino	Assisi, Perugia, Umbria	Saint Rufinus	cathedral; World Heritage Site	
Old Assisi Cathedral, now the Church of Santa Maria Maggiore, Assisi; Chiesa di Santa Maria Maggiore	Assisi-Nocera Umbra-Gualdo Tadino	Assisi, Perugia, Umbria	Saint Mary Major	parish church; former cathedral until 1036	also known as the Sanctuary of the Spoliation (Santuario della Spogliazione)
Asti Cathedral; Cattedrale di S. Maria Assunta	Asti	Asti, Piedmont	Assumption of the Blessed Virgin Mary and Saint Gotthard	cathedral	
Atri Cathedral; Basilica Concattedrale di S. Maria Assunta	Teramo-Atri	Atri, Teramo, Abruzzo	Assumption of the Blessed Virgin Mary	co-cathedral, minor basilica	
Avellino Cathedral; Cattedrale di S. Maria Assunta (e di San Modestino)	Avellino	Avellino, Campania	Assumption of the Blessed Virgin Mary; Saint Modestinus	cathedral	
Aversa Cathedral; Cattedrale di S. Paolo Apostolo	Aversa	Aversa, Caserta, Campania	Saint Paul	cathedral	
Avezzano Cathedral; Cattedrale di S. Bartolomeo Apostolo	Avezzano	Avezzano, L’Aquila, Abruzzo	Saint Bartholomew	cathedral	
Bagnoregio Cathedral; Basilica Concattedrale di S. Bonaventura	Viterbo	Bagnoregio, Viterbo, Lazio	Saint Bonaventure	co-cathedral	
Bari Cathedral; Cattedrale di San Sabino	Bari-Bitonto	Bari, Apulia	Saint Sabinus of Canosa	cathedral, minor basilica	
Basilica of Saint Nicholas, Bari; Basilica di San Nicola	Bari-Bitonto	Bari, Apulia	Saint Nicholas of Bari	former cathedral, minor basilica	
Barletta Cathedral; Concattedrale-Basilica di S. Maria Maggiore	Trani-Barletta-Bisceglie	Barletta, Bari, Apulia	Saint Mary Major	co-cathedral, minor basilica	
Belcastro Cathedral; Ex-cattedrale di S. Michele Arcangelo	Crotone-Santa Severina	Belcastro, Crotone, Calabria	Saint Michael	former cathedral, parish church	
Belluno Cathedral; Basilica Cattedrale di S. Martino	Belluno-Feltre	Belluno, Veneto	Saint Martin	cathedral, minor basilica	
Benevento Cathedral; Cattedrale di Maria SS. Assunta in Cielo	Benevento	Benevento, Campania	Assumption of the Blessed Virgin Mary	cathedral	
Bergamo Cathedral; Basilica Cattedrale di S. Alessandro in Colonna	Bergamo	Bergamo, Lombardy	Saint Alexander of Bergamo; formerly Saint Vincent	cathedral, minor basilica, parish church	
Bertinoro Cathedral; Concattedrale di S. Caterina	Forlì-Bertinoro	Bertinoro, Forlì-Cesena, Emilia Romagna	Saint Catherine	co-cathedral	
Biella Cathedral; Cattedrale di S. Stefano	Biella	Biella, Piedmont	Saint Stephen	cathedral	
Bisaccia Cathedral; Concattedrale della Natività della Vergine Maria	Sant'Angelo dei Lombardi-Conza-Nusco-Bisaccia	Bisaccia, Avellino, Campania	Nativity of the Blessed Virgin Mary	co-cathedral	
Bisceglie Cathedral; Basilica Concattedrale di S. Pietro Apostolo	Trani-Barletta-Bisceglie	Bisceglie, Bari, Apulia	Saint Peter	co-cathedral, minor basilica	
Bisignano Cathedral; Concattedrale di S. Maria Assunta	Cosenza-Bisignano	Bisignano, Cosenza, Calabria	Assumption of the Blessed Virgin Mary	co-cathedral	
Bitonto Cathedral; Concattedrale di Maria SS. Assunta (S. Valentino)	Bari-Bitonto	Bitonto, Bari, Apulia	Saint Valentine; Assumption of the Blessed Virgin Mary	co-cathedral	
Bobbio Cathedral; Concattedrale dell’Assunzione di Nostra Signora Maria	Piacenza-Bobbio	Bobbio, Piacenza, Emilia Romagna	Assumption of the Blessed Virgin Mary	co-cathedral	
Boiano Cathedral; Concattedrale di S. Bartolomeo	Campobasso-Boiano	Boiano, Campobasso, Molise	Saint Bartholomew	co-cathedral	
Bologna Cathedral; Cattedrale Metropolitana di S. Pietro Apostolo	Bologna	Bologna, Emilia Romagna	Saint Peter	cathedral	
Bolzano Cathedral / Bozen Cathedral; Kathedrale Mariä Himmelfahrt / Cattedrale di S. Maria Assunta	Bolzano-Brixen	Bolzano, Trentino-Alto Adige/South Tyrol	Assumption of the Blessed Virgin Mary	cathedral	
Bosa Cathedral; Concattedrale di Beata Vergine Immaculata	Alghero-Bosa	Bosa, Sassari, Sardinia	Immaculate Conception	co-cathedral	
Bova Cathedral; Concattedrale della Presentazione della Beata Vergine Maria	Reggio Calabria-Bova	Bova, Reggio di Calabria, Calabria	Presentation of the Virgin Mary	co-cathedral	
Bovino Cathedral; Basilica Concattedrale di S. Maria Assunta	Foggia-Bovino	Bovino, Foggia, Apulia	Assumption of the Blessed Virgin Mary	co-cathedral, minor basilica	
Brescia Cathedral (New); Cattedrale estiva di S. Maria Assunta e Ss. Pietro e Paolo, or Duomo Nuovo	Brescia	Brescia, Lombardy	Assumption of the Blessed Virgin Mary; Saint Peter and Saint Paul	cathedral	
Brescia Cathedral (Old); Concattedrale invernale di Santa Maria Assunta, or Duomo Vecchio	Brescia	Brescia, Lombardy	Assumption of the Blessed Virgin Mary	co-cathedral	
Brindisi Cathedral; Cattedrale della Visitazione e S. Giovanni Battista	Brindisi-Ostuni	Brindisi, Apulia	Visitation of the Blessed Virgin Mary; Saint John the Baptist	cathedral, minor basilica	
Brixen Cathedral; Kathedrale Mariä Himmelfahrt und St. Kassian / Cattedrale di S. Maria Assunta e S. Cassiano	Bolzano-Brixen	Brixen, Bolzano, Trentino-Alto Adige/South Tyrol	Assumption of the Blessed Virgin Mary and Saint Cassian	co-cathedral, minor basilica	
Brugnato Cathedral; Cattedrale di S. Pietro, S. Lorenzo e S. Colombano	La Spezia-Sarzana-Brugnato	Brugnato, La Spezia, Liguria	Saint Peter, Saint Lawrence and Saint Columbanus	co-cathedral	
Cagli Cathedral; Concattedrale di S. Maria Assunta	Fano-Fossombrone-Cagli-Pergola	Cagli, Pesaro e Urbino, Marche	Assumption of the Blessed Virgin Mary	co-cathedral, minor basilica	
Cagliari Cathedral; Cattedrale di S. Maria di Castello e Santa Cecilia	Cagliari	Cagliari, Sardinia	Saint Mary (S. Maria di Castello) and Saint Cecilia	cathedral	
Caiazzo Cathedral; Concattedrale di Maria SS. Assunta	Alife-Caiazzo	Caiazzo, Caserta, Campania	Assumption of the Blessed Virgin Mary	co-cathedral	
Caltagirone Cathedral; Basilica Cattedrale di S. Giuliano	Caltagirone	Caltagirone, Catania, Sicily	Saint Julian	cathedral, minor basilica; World Heritage Site	
Caltanissetta Cathedral; Cattedrale di S. Maria La Nova	Caltanissetta	Caltanissetta, Sicily	Saint Mary (S. Maria La Nova)	cathedral	
Calvi Cathedral; Concattedrale di S. Casto V.M.	Teano-Calvi	Calvi Risorta, Caserta, Campania	Saint Castus; Assumption of the Blessed Virgin Mary	co-cathedral	
Camerino Cathedral; Cattedrale di SS. Annunziata	Camerino-San Severino Marche	Camerino, Macerata, Marche	Annunciation of the Blessed Virgin Mary	cathedral, minor basilica	
Campagna Cathedral; Concattedrale-Basilica di S. Maria della Pace	Salerno-Campagna-Acerno	Campagna, Salerno, Campania	Queen of Peace	co-cathedral, minor basilica	
Campobasso Cathedral; Cattedrale della Santissima Trinità	Campobasso-Boiano	Campobasso, Molise	Holy Trinity	cathedral	
Canosa Cathedral; Duomo di S. Sabino	Andria	Canosa di Puglia, Bari, Apulia	Saint Sabinus of Canosa	former cathedral, parish church	
Capri Cathedral; Duomo di S. Stefano	Sorrento-Castellammare di Stabia	Capri, Campania	Saint Stephen	former cathedral, parish church	
Capri Cathedral; Duomo di S. Costanzo	Sorrento-Castellammare di Stabia	Capri, Campania	Saint Constantius	former cathedral, parish church	
Capua Cathedral; Basilica Cattedrale di Maria SS. Assunta in Cielo	Capua	Capua, Caserta, Campania	Assumption of the Blessed Virgin Mary	cathedral, minor basilica	
Cariati Cathedral; Concattedrale di S. Michele Arcangelo	Rossano-Cariati	Cariati, Cosenza, Calabria	Saint Michael	co-cathedral	
Carpi Cathedral; Cattedrale di S. Maria Assunta	Carpi	Carpi, Modena, Emilia Romagna	Assumption of the Blessed Virgin Mary	cathedral, minor basilica	
Casale Monferrato Cathedral; Cattedrale di S. Evasio e S. Lorenzo	Casale Monferrato	Casale Monferrato, Alessandria, Piedmont	Saint Evasius and Saint Lawrence	cathedral	
Caserta Cathedral; Cattedrale di S. Michele Arcangelo	Caserta	Caserta, Campania	Saint Michael	cathedral	
Cassano Cathedral; Cattedrale della Natività della Beata Vergine Maria	Cassano all'Ionio	Cassano allo Ionio, Cosenza, Calabria	Nativity of the Blessed Virgin Mary	cathedral	
Castellammare Cathedral; Concattedrale di S. Maria Assunta	Sorrento-Castellammare di Stabia	Castellammare di Stabia, Naples, Campania	Assumption of the Blessed Virgin Mary	co-cathedral	
Castellaneta Cathedral; Cattedrale di S. Nicola	Castellaneta	Castellaneta, Taranto, Apulia	Saint Nicholas	cathedral	
Castelsardo Cathedral; Concattedrale di S. Antonio Abate	Tempio-Ampurias	Castelsardo, Sassari, Sardinia	Saint Anthony Abbot	co-cathedral	
Castro Cathedral; Cattedrale di San Savino	Diocese of Acquapendente (formerly Diocese of Castro del Lazio)	Castro, Lazio	Saint Savinus	former cathedral	destroyed 1649, with the diocese and the city
Catania Cathedral; Basilica Cattedrale di S. Agata	Catania	Catania, Sicily	Saint Agatha	cathedral, minor basilica; World Heritage Site	
Catanzaro Cathedral; Cattedrale di S. Maria Assunta	Catanzaro-Squillace	Catanzaro, Calabria	Assumption of the Blessed Virgin Mary	cathedral	
Cava Cathedral; Concattedrale di S. Maria della Visitazione	Amalfi-Cava de' Tirreni	Cava de' Tirreni, Salerno, Campania	Visitation of the Blessed Virgin Mary	co-cathedral	
Cava de' Tirreni Abbey; Abbazia Territoriale della Santissima Trinità di Cava de' Tirreni	Territorial Abbey of Cava de’ Tirreni	Cava de' Tirreni, Salerno, Campania	Holy Trinity	former cathedral, abbey church	territorial abbey; cathedral from 1394 to 1513, when the diocese of Cava de' Tirreni was created
Cefalù Cathedral; Basilica Cattedrale della Trasfigurazione	Cefalù	Cefalù, Palermo, Sicily	Transfiguration	cathedral, immemorial minor basilica	
Cerenzia Cathedral; Cattedrale di San Teodoro	Crotone-Santa Severina	Cerenzia Vecchia, Crotone, Calabria	Saint Theodore of Amasea	former cathedral	in ruins
Cerignola Cathedral; Cattedrale di S. Pietro Apostolo	Cerignola–Ascoli Satriano	Cerignola, Foggia, Apulia	Saint Peter	cathedral, minor basilica	
Cerreto Cathedral; Cattedrale di SS. Trinità e Beata Vergine Maria Madre della Chiesa	Cerreto Sannita-Telese-Sant’Agata de’ Goti	Cerreto Sannita, Benevento, Campania	Holy Trinity and the Blessed Virgin Mary, Mother of the Church	cathedral	
Cerveteri Cathedral; Chiesa di S. Maria Maggiore	Porto-Santa Rufina	Cerveteri, Lazio	Saint Mary Major	former cathedral, archipresbyteral church	
Cervia Cathedral; Cattedrale di S. Maria Assunta	Ravenna-Cervia	Cervia, Ravenna, Emilia Romagna	Assumption of the Blessed Virgin Mary	co-cathedral	
Cesena Cathedral; Basilica Cattedrale di S. Giovanni Battista	Cesena-Sarsina	Cesena, Forlì-Cesena, Emilia Romagna	Saint John the Baptist	cathedral, minor basilica	
Chiavari Cathedral; Cattedrale di Nostra Signora dell’Orto e di Montallegro	Chiavari	Chiavari, Genoa, Liguria	Blessed Virgin Mary (Nostra Signora dell’Orto e di Montallegro)	cathedral, minor basilica	
Chieti Cathedral; Cattedrale di S. Tomaso Apostolo (S. Giustino)	Chieti-Vasto	Chieti, Abruzzo	Saint Thomas; Saint Justin	cathedral	
Chioggia Cathedral; Cattedrale di S. Maria Assunta	Chioggia	Chioggia, Venice, Veneto	Assumption of the Blessed Virgin Mary	cathedral	
Chiusi Cathedral; Concattedrale di S. Secondiano	Montepulciano-Chiusi-Pienza	Chiusi, Siena, Tuscany	Saint Secundianus	co-cathedral	
Cingoli Cathedral; Concattedrale di S. Maria Assunta	Macerata-Tolentino-Recanati-Cingoli-Treia	Cingoli, Macerata, Marche	Assumption of the Blessed Virgin Mary	co-cathedral	
Città della Pieve Cathedral; Concattedrale di Ss. Gervasio e Protasio	Perugia-Città della Pieve	Città della Pieve, Perugia, Umbria	Saints Gervasius and Protasius	co-cathedral	
Città di Castello Cathedral; Basilica Cattedrale di Ss. Florido e Amanzio	Città di Castello	Città di Castello, Perugia, Umbria	Saint Floridus and Saint Amantius	cathedral, minor basilica	
Civita Castellana Cathedral; Basilica Cattedrale di S. Maria Maggiore	Civita Castellana	Civita Castellana, Viterbo, Lazio	Saint Mary Major	cathedral, immemorial minor basilica	
Civitavecchia Cathedral; Cattedrale di S. Francesco d’Assisi	Civitavecchia-Tarquinia	Civitavecchia, Rome, Lazio	Saint Francis of Assisi	cathedral	
Colle di Val d'Elsa Cathedral; Concattedrale di Ss. Marziale e Alberto	Siena-Colle di Val d'Elsa-Montalcino	Colle di Val d'Elsa, Siena, Tuscany	Saint Martial and Saint Albert	co-cathedral	
Comacchio Cathedral; Concattedrale di S. Cassiano Martire	Ferrara-Comacchio	Comacchio, Ferrara, Emilia Romagna	Saint Cassian	co-cathedral, minor basilica	
Como Cathedral; Cattedrale di S. Maria Assunta	Como	Como, Lombardy	Assumption of the Blessed Virgin Mary	cathedral, minor basilica	
Concordia Cathedral; Cattedrale di S. Stefano Protomartire	Concordia-Pordenone	Concordia Sagittaria, Venice, Veneto	Saint Stephen	cathedral	
Conversano Cathedral; Cattedrale di S. Maria Assunta	Conversano-Monopoli	Conversano, Bari, Apulia	Assumption of the Blessed Virgin Mary	cathedral, minor basilica	
Conza Cathedral; Concattedrale di S. Maria Assunta	Sant'Angelo dei Lombardi-Conza-Nusco-Bisaccia	Conza della Campania, Avellino, Campania	Assumption of the Blessed Virgin Mary	co-cathedral	
Corfinio Cathedral; Concattedrale di S. Pelino	Sulmona-Valva	Corfinio, L’Aquila, Abruzzo	Saint Pelinus	co-cathedral	
Cortona Cathedral; Concattedrale di S. Maria Assunta	Arezzo-Cortona-Sansepolcro	Cortona, Arezzo, Tuscany	Assumption of the Blessed Virgin Mary	co-cathedral	
Cosenza Cathedral; Cattedrale di S. Maria Assunta	Cosenza-Bisignano	Cosenza, Calabria	Assumption of the Blessed Virgin Mary	cathedral	
Crema Cathedral; Cattedrale di S. Maria Assunta	Crema	Crema, Cremona, Lombardy	Assumption of the Blessed Virgin Mary	cathedral	
Cremona Cathedral; Cattedrale di S. Maria Assunta	Cremona	Cremona, Lombardy	Assumption of the Blessed Virgin Mary	cathedral	
Crotone Cathedral; Basilica Cattedrale di S. Maria Assunta	Crotone-Santa Severina	Crotone, Calabria	Assumption of the Blessed Virgin Mary	cathedral, minor basilica	
Cuneo Cathedral; Cattedrale di S. Maria del Bosco	Cuneo	Cuneo, Piedmont	Saint Mary (S. Maria del Bosco)	cathedral	
Dolianova Cathedral; Cattedrale di San Pantaleo	Cagliari	Dolianova, Sardinia	Saint Pantaleon	co-cathedral	
Fabriano Cathedral; Basilica Cattedrale di S. Venanzio Martire	Fabriano-Matelica	Fabriano, Ancona, Marche	Saint Venantius	cathedral, minor basilica	
Faenza Cathedral; Basilica Cattedrale di S. Pietro Apostolo	Faenza-Modigliana	Faenza, Ravenna, Emilia Romagna	Saint Peter	cathedral, minor basilica	
Fano Cathedral; Basilica Cattedrale di S. Maria Maggiore	Fano-Fossombrone-Cagli-Pergola	Fano, Pesaro e Urbino, Marche	Saint Mary Major	cathedral, minor basilica	
Feltre Cathedral; Concattedrale di S. Pietro Apostolo	Belluno-Feltre	Feltre, Belluno, Veneto	Saint Peter and Saint Prosdocimus	co-cathedral	
Ferentino Cathedral; Concattedrale di Ss. Giovanni e Paolo (S. Pietro Ap.)	Frosinone-Veroli-Ferentino	Ferentino, Frosinone, Lazio	Saints John and Paul; Saint Peter	co-cathedral	
Fermo Cathedral; Basilica Cattedrale di Maria SS. Assunta in Cielo	Fermo	Fermo, Marche	Assumption of the Blessed Virgin Mary	cathedral, minor basilica	
Ferrara Cathedral; Basilica Cattedrale di S. Giorgio	Ferrara-Comacchio	Ferrara, Emilia Romagna	Saint George	cathedral, minor basilica	consecrated 1135
St. George's Basilica Without the Walls; Basilica di S. Giorgio fuori le mura	Ferrara-Comacchio	Ferrara, Emilia Romagna	Saint George	former cathedral, minor basilica	replaced in 1135
Fidenza Cathedral; Cattedrale di S. Donnino M.	Fidenza	Fidenza, Parma, Emilia Romagna	Saint Domninus	cathedral	
Fiesole Cathedral; Cattedrale di S. Romolo	Fiesole	Fiesole, Florence, Tuscany	Saint Romulus	cathedral	
Florence Cathedral; Basilica Cattedrale di S. Maria del Fiore	Florence	Florence, Tuscany	Saint Mary (S. Maria del Fiore)	cathedral, immemorial minor basilica; World Heritage Site	
Foggia Cathedral; Cattedrale di S. Maria Assunta in Cielo, otherwise di Santa Maria Icona Vetere or di Santa Maria in Fovea	Foggia-Bovino	Foggia, Apulia	Assumption of the Blessed Virgin Mary	cathedral, minor basilica	
Foligno Cathedral; Cattedrale di S. Feliciano V.M.	Foligno	Foligno, Perugia, Umbria	Saint Felician	cathedral	
Fondi Cathedral; Ex-cattedrale di S. Pietro Apostolo	Gaeta	Fondi, Latina, Lazio	Saint Peter	former cathedral, parish church	
Forlì Cathedral; Cattedrale di S. Croce	Forlì-Bertinoro	Forlì, Forlì-Cesena, Emilia Romagna	Holy Cross	cathedral	
Fossano Cathedral; Cattedrale-Basilica di S. Maria e S. Giovenale	Fossano	Fossano, Cuneo, Piedmont	Blessed Virgin Mary and Saint Juvenal	cathedral, immemorial minor basilica	
Fossombrone Cathedral; Concattedrale di Ss. Aldebrando e Agostino	Fano-Fossombrone-Cagli-Pergola	Fossombrone, Pesaro e Urbino, Marche	Saint Augustine and Saint Aldebrandus	co-cathedral	
Frascati Cathedral; Basilica Cattedrale di S. Pietro Apostolo	Frascati	Frascati, Rome, Lazio	Saint Peter	cathedral, minor basilica	
Frosinone Cathedral; Cattedrale di S. Andrea Apostolo	Frosinone-Veroli-Ferentino	Frosinone, Lazio	Saint Andrew	cathedral	
Gaeta Cathedral; Cattedrale-Basilica di Maria SS. Assunta	Gaeta	Gaeta, Latina, Lazio	Assumption of the Blessed Virgin Mary	cathedral, minor basilica	
Gallese Cathedral; Concattedrale di S. Maria Assunta	Civita Castellana	Gallese, Viterbo, Lazio	Assumption of the Blessed Virgin Mary	co-cathedral	
Gallipoli Cathedral; Basilica Concattedrale di S. Agata Vergine	Nardò-Gallipoli	Gallipoli, Lecce, Apulia	Saint Agatha	co-cathedral, minor basilica	
Genoa Cathedral; Cattedrale di S. Lorenzo	Genoa	Genoa, Liguria	Saint Lawrence	cathedral; World Heritage Site	
Gerace Cathedral; Concattedrale di S. Maria Assunta	Locri-Gerace	Gerace, Reggio Calabria, Calabria	Assumption of the Blessed Virgin Mary	co-cathedral	
Giovinazzo Cathedral; Concattedrale di S. Maria Assunta	Molfetta-Ruvo-Giovinazzo-Terlizzi	Giovinazzo, Bari, Apulia	Assumption of the Blessed Virgin Mary	co-cathedral	
Gorizia Cathedral; Cattedrale di Ss. Ilario e Taziano	Gorizia	Gorizia, Friuli-Venezia Giulia	Saints Hilarius and Tatianus	cathedral	
Grado Cathedral; Basilica di S. Eufemia	Gorizia	Grado, Friuli-Venezia Giulia	Saint Euphemia	former cathedral, immemorial minor basilica, parish church	cathedral 568–700
Gravina Cathedral; Basilica Concattedrale di Maria SS. Assunta	Altamura-Gravina-Acquaviva delle Fonti	Gravina in Puglia, Bari, Apulia	Assumption of the Blessed Virgin Mary	co-cathedral, minor basilica	
Grosseto Cathedral; Cattedrale di S. Lorenzo	Grosseto	Grosseto, Tuscany	Saint Lawrence	cathedral	
Grottaferrata Abbey; Abbazia di S. Maria di Grottaferrata	Territorial Abbey of Grottaferrata	Grottaferrata, Rome, Lazio	Saint Mary (S. Maria di Grottaferrata)	abbey church	territorial abbey; Italo-Albanian Catholic Church
Gualdo Tadino Cathedral; Basilica Concattedrale di S. Benedetto	Assisi-Nocera Umbra-Gualdo Tadino	Gualdo Tadino, Perugia, Umbria	Saint Benedict	co-cathedral, minor basilica	
Guastalla Cathedral; Concattedrale di Ss. Pietro e Paolo	Reggio Emilia-Guastalla	Guastalla, Reggio Emilia, Emilia Romagna	Saint Peter and Saint Paul	co-cathedral	
Gubbio Cathedral; Cattedrale di Ss. Mariano e Giacomo Mm.	Gubbio	Gubbio, Perugia, Umbria	Saints Marianus and James	cathedral	
Jesi Cathedral; Basilica Cattedrale di S. Settimio	Iesi	Jesi, Ancona, Marche	Saint Septimius	cathedral, minor basilica	
Iglesias Cathedral; Cattedrale di S. Chiara d’Assisi	Iglesias	Iglesias, Carbonia-Iglesias, Sardinia	Saint Clare	cathedral	from 1503, succeeding Tratalias Cathedral
Imola Cathedral; Basilica Cattedrale di S. Cassiano Martire	Imola	Imola, Bologna, Emilia Romagna	Saint Cassian	cathedral, minor basilica	
Imperia Cathedral; Concattedrale di Ss. Maurizio e Compagni Martiri	Albenga-Imperia	Imperia, Liguria	Saint Maurice and the Theban Legion	co-cathedral	
Irsina Cathedral; Concattedrale di S. Maria Assunta	Matera-Irsina	Irsina, Matera, Basilicata	Assumption of the Blessed Virgin Mary	co-cathedral	
Ischia Cathedral; Cattedrale di S. Maria Assunta	Ischia	Ischia, Naples, Campania	Assumption of the Blessed Virgin Mary	cathedral	
Isernia Cathedral; Cattedrale di S. Pietro Apostolo	Isernia-Venafro	Isernia, Molise	Saint Peter	cathedral	
Isola Cathedral; Ex-cattedrale di S. Maria Assunta	Crotone-Santa Severina	Isola di Capo Rizzuto, Crotone, Calabria	Assumption of the Blessed Virgin Mary	former cathedral, parish church	
Ivrea Cathedral; Cattedrale di S. Maria Assunta	Ivrea	Ivrea, Turin, Piedmont	Assumption of the Blessed Virgin Mary	cathedral	
L'Aquila Cathedral; Cattedrale di SS. Massimo e Giorgio	L'Aquila	L'Aquila, Abruzzo	Saint Maximus and Saint George	cathedral	from 1256
La Spezia Cathedral; Cattedrale di Cristo Re	La Spezia-Sarzana-Brugnato	La Spezia, Liguria	Christ the King	cathedral	
Lacedonia Cathedral; Concattedrale di S. Maria Assunta	Ariano Irpino-Lacedonia	Lacedonia, Avellino, Campania	Assumption of the Blessed Virgin Mary	co-cathedral	
Lagonegro Cathedral; Concattedrale della Trinità	Tursi-Lagonegro	Lagonegro, Potenza, Basilicata	Holy Trinity	co-cathedral	
Lanciano Cathedral; Basilica Cattedrale della Madonna del Ponte	Lanciano-Ortona	Lanciano, Chieti, Abruzzo	Blessed Virgin Mary (Madonna del Ponte)	cathedral, minor basilica	
Lanusei Cathedral; Cattedrale di S. Maria Maddalena	Lanusei	Lanusei, Ogliastra, Sardinia	Saint Mary Magdalene	cathedral	
Larino Cathedral; Concattedrale di S. Pardo	Termoli-Larino	Larino, Campobasso, Molise	Assumption of the Blessed Virgin Mary; Saint Pardus	co-cathedral, minor basilica	
Latina Cathedral; Cattedrale di S. Marco	Latina-Terracina-Sezze-Priverno	Latina, Lazio	Saint Mark	cathedral	
Lecce Cathedral; Cattedrale di Maria SS. Assunta	Lecce	Lecce, Apulia	Assumption of the Blessed Virgin Mary	cathedral	
Lesina Cathedral; Cattedrale di San Primiano	Termoli-Larino	Lesina, Apulia	Saint Primianus	former cathedral, parish church	
Lipari Cathedral; Concattedrale di S. Bartolomeo	Messina-Lipari-Santa Lucia del Mela	Lipari, Messina, Sicily	Saint Bartholomew	co-cathedral	
Livorno Cathedral; Cattedrale di S. Francesco	Livorno	Livorno, Tuscany	Saint Francis of Assisi	cathedral	
Locri Cathedral; Cattedrale di S. Maria del Mastro	Locri-Gerace	Locri, Reggio Calabria, Calabria	Saint Mary (S. Maria del Mastro)	cathedral	
Lodi Cathedral; Basilica Cattedrale di S. Bassiano	Lodi	Lodi, Lombardy	Saint Bassianus	cathedral, minor basilica	
Pontifical Basilica of the Holy House of Loreto; Santuario Basilica Pontificia di S. Casa	Territorial Prelature of Loreto	Loreto, Ancona, Marche	Nativity of the Blessed Virgin Mary	cathedral, pontifical minor basilica, pontifical church, shrine	
Lucca Cathedral; Cattedrale di S. Martino	Lucca	Lucca, Tuscany	Saint Martin	cathedral	
Lucera Cathedral; Basilica Cattedrale di Maria SS. Assunta in Cielo (also Santa Maria della Vittoria)	Lucera-Troia	Lucera, Foggia, Apulia	Assumption of the Blessed Virgin Mary (popularly Santa Maria della Vittoria: Saint Mary of Victory)	cathedral, minor basilica	
Lungro Cathedral; Cattedrale di S. Nicola di Mira	Lungro	Lungro, Cosenza, Calabria	Saint Nicholas	cathedral	Italo-Albanian Catholic Church
Luni Cathedral; Cattedrale di Santa Maria	La Spezia-Sarzana-Brugnato	Luni in Ortonovo, La Spezia, Liguria	Saint Mary	former cathedral	abandoned in the early 13th century for Sarzana; no visible remains
Macerata Cathedral; Cattedrale di S. Giuliano	Macerata-Tolentino-Recanati-Cingoli-Treia	Macerata, Marche	Saint Julian the Hospitaller	cathedral	
Manfredonia Cathedral; Cattedrale di S. Lorenzo Maiorano	Manfredonia-Vieste-San Giovanni Rotondo	Manfredonia, Foggia, Apulia	Saint Laurence of Siponto	cathedral	
Mantua Cathedral; Cattedrale di S. Pietro Apostolo	Mantua	Mantua, Lombardy	Saint Peter	cathedral; World Heritage Site	
Basilica of St. Andrew, Mantua; Basilica di S. Andrea Apostolo	Mantua	Mantua, Lombardy	Saint Andrew	co-cathedral, immemorial minor basilica; World Heritage Site	
Marsico Nuovo Cathedral; Concattedrale di S. Maria Assunta o S. Giorgio	Potenza-Muro Lucano-Marsico Nuovo	Marsico Nuovo, Potenza, Basilicata	Assumption of the Blessed Virgin Mary and Saint George	co-cathedral	
Martirano Cathedral; Ex-cattedrale di S. Maria Assunta	Lamezia Terme	Martirano, Catanzaro, Calabria	Assumption of the Blessed Virgin Mary	former cathedral	
Massa Cathedral; Basilica Cattedrale di S. Pietro Apostolo e S. Francesco d’Assisi	Massa Carrara-Pontremoli	Massa, Massa-Carrara, Tuscany	Saint Peter and Saint Francis of Assisi	cathedral, minor basilica	
Massa Marittima Cathedral; Basilica Cattedrale di Cerbone Vescovo	Massa Marittima-Piombino	Massa Marittima, Grosseto, Tuscany	Saint Cerbonius	cathedral, minor basilica	
Matelica Cathedral; Concattedrale di S. Maria Assunta	Fabriano-Matelica	Matelica, Ancona, Marche	Assumption of the Blessed Virgin Mary	co-cathedral	
Matera Cathedral; Basilica Cattedrale di S. Maria Assunta della Bruna	Matera-Irsina	Matera, Basilicata	Assumption of the Blessed Virgin Mary; Saint Eustace	cathedral, minor basilica	
Mazara Cathedral; Basilica Cattedrale di SS. Salvatore	Mazara del Vallo	Mazara del Vallo, Trapani, Sicily	Holy Saviour	cathedral, minor basilica	
Melfi Cathedral; Basilica Cattedrale di S. Maria Assunta	Melfi-Rapolla-Venosa	Melfi, Potenza, Basilicata	Assumption of the Blessed Virgin Mary	cathedral, minor basilica	
Messina Cathedral; Basilica Cattedrale di S. Maria SS. Assunta	Messina-Lipari-Santa Lucia del Mela	Messina, Sicily	Assumption of the Blessed Virgin Mary	cathedral, minor basilica	
Co-Cathedral of the Most Holy Saviour, Messina; Concattedrale Archimandritato del Santissimo Salvatore	Messina-Lipari-Santa Lucia del Mela	Messina, Sicily	Holy Saviour	co-cathedral	
Milan Cathedral; Cattedrale di S. Maria Nascente	Milan	Milan, Lombardy	Nativity of the Blessed Virgin Mary	cathedral	
Mileto Cathedral; Cattedrale di Maria SS. Assunta in Cielo	Mileto-Nicotera-Tropea	Mileto, Vibo Valentia, Calabria	Assumption of the Blessed Virgin Mary	cathedral	
Minturno Cathedral; Ex-cattedrale di S. Pietro Apostolo	Gaeta	Minturno, Latina, Lazio	Saint Peter	former cathedral, parish church	
Modena Cathedral; Cattedrale di S. Maria Assunta	Modena-Nonantola	Modena, Emilia Romagna	Assumption of the Blessed Virgin Mary	cathedral, minor basilica, priory church; World Heritage Site	
Modigliana Cathedral; Concattedrale di S. Stefano papa	Faenza-Modigliana	Modigliana, Forlì-Cesena, Emilia Romagna	Saint Stephen I	co-cathedral	
Molfetta Cathedral; Cattedrale di S. Maria Assunta e Sant'Ignazio di Loyola	Molfetta-Ruvo-Giovinazzo-Terlizzi	Molfetta, Bari, Apulia	Assumption of the Blessed Virgin Mary and Saint Ignatius Loyola	cathedral	
Old Molfetta Cathedral; Chiesa di San Corrado, also Duomo vecchio	Molfetta-Ruvo-Giovinazzo-Terlizzi	Molfetta, Bari, Apulia	Saint Conrad of Bavaria	former cathedral, now parish church	
Mondovì Cathedral; Cattedrale di S. Donato	Mondovì	Mondovì, Cuneo, Piedmont	Saint Donatus	cathedral	
Monopoli Cathedral; Basilica Cattedrale di Maria SS. della Madia	Conversano-Monopoli	Monopoli, Bari, Apulia	Saint Mary (Santa Maria della Madia)	co-cathedral, minor basilica	
Monreale Cathedral; Basilica Cattedrale di S. Maria La Nuova	Monreale	Monreale, Palermo, Sicily	Saint Mary (S. Maria La Nuova)	cathedral, minor basilica	
Montalcino Cathedral; Concattedrale di S. Salvatore	Siena-Colle di Val d'Elsa-Montalcino	Montalcino, Siena, Tuscany	Holy Saviour	co-cathedral	
Montalto Cathedral; Basilica Concattedrale di S. Maria Assunta	San Benedetto del Tronto-Ripatransone-Montalto	Montalto delle Marche, Ascoli Piceno, Marche	Assumption of the Blessed Virgin Mary	co-cathedral, minor basilica	
Monte Oliveto Maggiore (Abbey of Monte Oliveto Maggiore); Abbazia di Monte Oliveto Maggiore	Territorial Abbey of Monte Oliveto Maggiore	Chiusure in Asciano, Siena, Tuscany	Saint Mary (Santa Maria di Monte Oliveto)	abbey church	territorial abbey
Monte Cassino (Abbey of Monte Cassino); Basilica Cattedrale Maria di SS. Assunta e S. Benedetto Abate	Territorial Abbey of Monte Cassino	Cassino, Frosinone, Lazio	Assumption of the Blessed Virgin Mary and Saint Benedict	cathedral, abbey church, immemorial minor basilica	territorial abbey; cathedral from 1321
Montefiascone Cathedral; Basilica Cattedrale di S. Margherita d’Antiochia	Viterbo	Montefiascone, Viterbo, Lazio	Saint Margaret of Antioch	former cathedral, minor basilica	
Montepulciano Cathedral; Cattedrale di S. Maria Assunta	Montepulciano-Chiusi-Pienza	Montepulciano, Siena, Tuscany	Assumption of the Blessed Virgin Mary	cathedral	
Montevergine Abbey; Santuario di S. Maria di Montevergine	Territorial Abbey of Montevergine	Montevergine in Mercogliano, Avellino, Campania	Saint Mary (S. Maria di Montevergine)	cathedral, abbey church, shrine	territorial abbey; cathedral from 1879
Muro Cathedral; Concattedrale di S. Nicola	Potenza-Muro Lucano-Marsico Nuovo	Muro Lucano, Potenza, Basilicata	Saint Nicholas	co-cathedral	
Naples Cathedral; Cattedrale di Maria SS. Assunta; Cattedrale di San Gennaro	Naples	Naples, Campania	Assumption of the Blessed Virgin Mary; Saint Januarius	cathedral; World Heritage Site	
Nardò Cathedral; Basilica Cattedrale di S. Maria Assunta	Nardò-Gallipoli	Nardò, Lecce, Apulia	Assumption of the Blessed Virgin Mary	cathedral, minor basilica	
Narni Cathedral; Concattedrale di S. Giovenale	Terni-Narni-Amelia	Narni, Terni, Umbria	Saint Juvenal	co-cathedral	
Nepi Cathedral; Concattedrale di S. Maria Assunta e S. Anastasia	Civita Castellana	Nepi, Viterbo, Lazio	Assumption of the Blessed Virgin Mary; Saint Anastasia	co-cathedral	
Nicastro Cathedral; Cattedrale di Ss. Pietro e Paolo	Lamezia Terme	Nicastro, Catanzaro, Calabria	Saint Peter and Saint Paul	cathedral	
Nicosia Cathedral; Cattedrale di S. Nicola di Bari	Nicosia	Nicosia, Enna, Sicily	Saint Nicholas of Bari	cathedral, minor basilica	
Nicotera Cathedral; Concattedrale di S. Maria Assunta	Mileto-Nicotera-Tropea	Nicotera, Vibo Valentia, Calabria	Assumption of the Blessed Virgin Mary	co-cathedral	
Nocera Cathedral; Cattedrale di S. Marco	Nocera Inferiore-Sarno	Nocera Inferiore, Salerno, Campania	Saint Mark	cathedral	
Nocera Umbra Cathedral; Concattedrale di S. Maria Assunta	Assisi-Nocera Umbra-Gualdo Tadino	Nocera Umbra, Perugia, Umbria	Assumption of the Blessed Virgin Mary	co-cathedral	
Nola Cathedral; Basilica Cattedrale di Maria SS. Assunta	Nola	Nola, Naples, Campania	Assumption of the Blessed Virgin Mary	cathedral, minor basilica	
Noli Cathedral; Concattedrale di S. Pietro	Savona-Noli	Noli, Savona, Liguria	Saint Peter	co-cathedral	
Nonantola Abbey; Abbazia di Nonantola	Modena-Nonantola	Nonantola, Modena, Emilia Romagna	Saint Sylvester	co-cathedral, former territorial abbey, immemorial minor basilica, abbey church	
Norcia Cathedral; Concattedrale di S. Maria Argentea	Spoleto-Norcia	Norcia, Perugia, Umbria	Saint Mary (S. Maria Argentea)	co-cathedral	
Noto Cathedral; Cattedrale di S. Nicolò	Noto	Noto, Syracuse, Sicily	Saint Nicholas	cathedral; World Heritage Site	rebuilt 2007
Novara Cathedral; Cattedrale di S. Maria Assunta	Novara	Novara, Piedmont	Assumption of the Blessed Virgin Mary	cathedral	
Nuoro Cathedral; Cattedrale di S. Maria delle Neve	Nuoro	Nuoro, Sardinia	Our Lady of the Snows	cathedral	
Nuoro Old Cathedral; Duomo di S. Nicola	Nuoro	Ottana, Nuoro, Sardinia	Saint Nicholas	former cathedral, parish church	
Nusco Cathedral; Concattedrale di S. Stefano	Sant'Angelo dei Lombardi-Conza-Nusco-Bisaccia	Nusco, Avellino, Campania	Saint Stephen	co-cathedral	
Oppido Mamertina Cathedral; Cattedrale di Maria SS. Assunta	Oppido Mamertina-Palmi	Oppido Mamertina, Reggio Calabria, Calabria	Assumption of the Blessed Virgin Mary	cathedral	
Prelatial Church of Santa Maria della Pace; Chiesa Prelatizia di Santa Maria della Pace	Opus Dei	Viale Bruno Buozzi, 75, Rome, Lazio	Our Lady of Peace	cathedral	
Orbetello Cathedral; Concattedrale di S. Maria Assunta (S. Biagio)	Pitigliano-Sovana-Orbetello	Orbetello, Grosseto, Tuscany	Assumption of the Blessed Virgin Mary; Saint Blaise	co-cathedral	
Santa Caterina a Magnanapoli (also the seat of the Ordinariato Militare in Italia); Chiesa Principale di Santa Catarina da Siena a Magnanapoli	Military Ordinariate in Italy; Ordinariato Militare in Italia	Rome, Lazio	Saint Catherine of Siena	cathedral	
Oria Cathedral; Basilica Cattedrale di S. Maria Assunta in Cielo	Oria	Oria, Brindisi, Apulia	Assumption of the Blessed Virgin Mary	cathedral, minor basilica	
Oristano Cathedral; Cattedrale di S. Maria Assunta	Oristano	Oristano, Sardinia	Assumption of the Blessed Virgin Mary	cathedral	
Orte Cathedral; Concattedrale di S. Maria Assunta	Civita Castellana	Orte, Viterbo, Lazio	Assumption of the Blessed Virgin Mary	co-cathedral	
Ortona Cathedral; Basilica Concattedrale di S. Tommaso Apostolo	Lanciano-Ortona	Ortona, Chieti, Abruzzo	Saint Thomas	co-cathedral, minor basilica	
Orvieto Cathedral; Cattedrale di S. Maria Assunta	Orvieto-Todi	Orvieto, Terni, Umbria	Assumption of the Blessed Virgin Mary	cathedral, minor basilica	
Osimo Cathedral; Basilica Concattedrale di S. Leopardo	Ancona-Osimo	Osimo, Ancona, Marche	Saint Leopardus	co-cathedral, minor basilica	
Ostia Cathedral; Cattedrale di S. Aurea	Ostia	Borgo di Ostia Antica, Rome, Lazio	Saint Aurea	cathedral	from 1928
Ostuni Cathedral; Concattedrale di S. Maria Assunta	Brindisi-Ostuni	Ostuni, Brindisi, Apulia	Assumption of the Blessed Virgin Mary	co-cathedral	
Otranto Cathedral; Cattedrale di Maria SS. Annunziata	Otranto	Otranto, Lecce, Apulia	Annunciation of the Blessed Virgin Mary	cathedral, minor basilica	
Ozieri Cathedral; Cattedrale della Immacolata Concezione	Ozieri	Ozieri, Sassari, Sardinia	Immaculate Conception	cathedral	
Padua Cathedral; Basilica Cattedrale di S. Maria	Padua	Padua, Veneto	Saint Mary	cathedral, immemorial minor basilica	
Palermo Cathedral; Cattedrale di l’Assunzione di Maria	Palermo	Palermo, Sicily	Assumption of the Blessed Virgin Mary	cathedral	
Palestrina Cathedral; Basilica Cattedrale di S. Agapito Martire	Palestrina	Palestrina, Rome, Lazio	Saint Agapitus	cathedral, immemorial minor basilica	
Palmi Cathedral; Concattedrale di S. Nicola	Oppido Mamertina-Palmi	Palmi, Reggio Calabria, Calabria	Saint Nicholas	co-cathedral	
Parma Cathedral; Basilica Cattedrale della Assunzione di Maria Virgine	Parma	Parma, Emilia Romagna	Assumption of the Blessed Virgin Mary	cathedral, minor basilica	from 1106
Patti Cathedral; Cattedrale di S. Bartolomeo	Patti	Patti, Messina, Sicily	Saint Bartholomew	cathedral	
Pavia Cathedral; Cattedrale di S. Maria Assunta e S. Stefano Prot.	Pavia	Pavia, Lombardy	Assumption of the Blessed Virgin Mary and Saint Stephen	cathedral	
Pennabilli Cathedral (Collegiate Church of St. Bartholomew); Cattedrale Collegiata di S. Bartolomeo	San Marino-Montefeltro	Pennabilli, Rimini, Marche	Saint Bartholomew	cathedral	collegiate church 1555; cathedral from 1572, consecrated 1588; re-consecrated 17 June 2000
Penne Cathedral; Concattedrale di S. Massimo	Pescara-Penne	Penne, Pescara, Abruzzo	Saint Maximus	co-cathedral	
Pergola Cathedral; Concattedrale di S. Andrea	Fano-Fossombrone-Cagli-Pergola	Pergola, Pesaro e Urbino, Marche	Saint Andrew	co-cathedral	
Perugia Cathedral; Cattedrale di S. Lorenzo (Ss. Andrea e Lucia)	Perugia-Città della Pieve	Perugia, Umbria	Saint Lawrence, Saint Andrew and Saint Lucy	cathedral	
Pesaro Cathedral; Cattedrale di S. Maria Assunta	Pesaro	Pesaro, Pesaro e Urbino, Marche	Assumption of the Blessed Virgin Mary	cathedral, immemorial minor basilica	
Pescara Cathedral; Cattedrale di S. Cetteo Vescovo e Martire	Pescara-Penne	Pescara, Abruzzo	Saint Cetteus	cathedral	
Pescia Cathedral; Cattedrale di Maria SS. Assunta e S. Giovanni Battista	Pescia	Pescia, Pistoia, Tuscany	Assumption of the Blessed Virgin Mary and Saint John the Baptist	cathedral	
Pescina Cathedral; Concattedrale di S. Maria delle Grazie	Avezzano	Pescina, L’Aquila, Abruzzo	Saint Mary (S. Maria delle Grazie)	co-cathedral	
Piacenza Cathedral; Basilica Cattedrale di S. Giustina e S. Maria Assunta	Piacenza-Bobbio	Piacenza, Emilia Romagna	Assumption of the Blessed Virgin Mary and Saint Justina	cathedral, immemorial minor basilica	
Piana degli Albanesi Cathedral; Cattedrale di S. Demetrio Megalomartire	Piana degli Albanesi	Piana degli Albanesi, Palermo, Sicily	Saint Demetrius the Great Martyr	cathedral)	Italo-Albanese rite
Piazza Armerina Cathedral; Cattedrale di Maria SS. delle Vittorie	Piazza Armerina	Piazza Armerina, Enna, Sicily	Saint Mary (Maria SS. delle Vittorie)	cathedral, minor basilica	
Pienza Cathedral; Concattedrale di Maria SS. Assunta	Montepulciano-Chiusi-Pienza	Pienza, Siena, Tuscany	Assumption of the Blessed Virgin Mary	co-cathedral; World Heritage Site	
Pinerolo Cathedral; Cattedrale di S. Donato	Pinerolo	Pinerolo, Turin, Piedmont	Saint Donatus	cathedral	
Piombino Cathedral; Chiesa Abbaziale di S. Antimo M.	Massa Marittima-Piombino	Piombino, Livorno, Tuscany	Saint Anthimus	co-cathedral, abbey church	
Pisa Cathedral; Cattedrale di S. Maria Assunta	Pisa	Pisa, Tuscany	Assumption of the Blessed Virgin Mary	cathedral; World Heritage Site	
Pistoia Cathedral; Basilica Cattedrale di S. Zenone	Pistoia	Pistoia, Tuscany	Saint Zeno	cathedral, minor basilica	
Pitigliano Cathedral; Cattedrale di Ss. Pietro e Paolo	Pitigliano-Sovana-Orbetello	Pitigliano, Grosseto, Tuscany	Saint Peter and Saint Paul	cathedral	
Poggio Cathedral; Cattedrale di S. Maria Assunta	Sabina-Poggio Mirteto	Poggio Mirteto, Rieti, Lazio	Assumption of the Blessed Virgin Mary	cathedral	from 1962
Policastro Cathedral; Concattedrale di S. Maria Assunta	Teggiano-Policastro	Policastro Bussentino in Santa Marina, Salerno, Campania	Assumption of the Blessed Virgin Mary	co-cathedral	
Pontifical Basilica of Our Lady of the Rosary of Pompei; Santuario Basilica Pontificia della Madonna del Rosario	Territorial Prelature of Pompei	Pompei, Naples, Campania	Our Lady of the Rosary	cathedral, pontifical minor basilica, pontifical church, shrine	
Pontecorvo Cathedral; Concattedrale di S. Bartolomeo Apostolo	Sora-Aquino-Pontecorvo	Pontecorvo, Frosinone, Lazio	Saint Bartholomew	co-cathedral, minor basilica	
Pontremoli Cathedral; Concattedrale di S. Maria Assunta	Massa Carrara-Pontremoli	Pontremoli, Massa-Carrara, Tuscany	Assumption of the Blessed Virgin Mary	co-cathedral	
Pordenone Cathedral; Concattedrale di S. Marco	Concordia-Pordenone	Pordenone, Friuli-Venezia Giulia, Veneto	Saint Mark	co-cathedral	
Porto Cathedral; Cattedrale dei Sacri Cuori di Gesù e Maria	Porto-Santa Rufina	La Storta, Rome, Lazio	Sacred Hearts of Jesus and Mary	cathedral	
Porto Cathedral; Chiesa di SS. Ippolito e Lucia	Porto-Santa Rufina	Porto di Traiano, Lazio	Saint Hippolytus and Saint Lucy	co-cathedral	
Potenza Cathedral; Basilica Cattedrale di S. Maria Assunta e S. Gerardo Vescovo	Potenza-Muro Lucano-Marsico Nuovo	Potenza, Basilicata	Assumption of the Blessed Virgin Mary and Saint Gerard	cathedral, minor basilica	
Pozzuoli Cathedral; Basilica Cattedrale di S. Procolo M.	Pozzuoli	Pozzuoli, Naples, Campania	Saint Proculus	cathedral, minor basilica	
St. Paul's Cathedral, Pozzuoli; Concattedrale di S. Paolo Apostolo	Pozzuoli	Monterusciello di Pozzuoli, Pozzuoli, Naples, Campania	Saint Paul	co-cathedral	
Prato Cathedral; Basilica Cattedrale di S. Stefano	Prato	Prato, Tuscany	Saint Stephen	cathedral, minor basilica	
Priverno Cathedral; Concattedrale di S. Maria	Latina-Terracina-Sezze-Priverno	Priverno, Latina, Lazio	Saint Mary	co-cathedral	
Ragusa Cathedral; Cattedrale di S. Giovanni Battista	Ragusa	Ragusa, Sicily	Saint John the Baptist	cathedral; World Heritage Site	
Rapolla Cathedral; Concattedrale di S. Michele Arcangelo	Melfi-Rapolla-Venosa	Rapolla, Potenza, Basilicata	Saint Michael	co-cathedral	
Ravello Cathedral; Basilica di S. Maria Assunta e S. Pantaleone	Amalfi-Cava de' Tirreni	Ravello, Salerno, Campania	Assumption of the Blessed Virgin Mary and Saint Pantaleon	former cathedral, minor basilica	
Ravenna Cathedral; Cattedrale di Risurrezione di N.S. Gesù Cristo or Basilica Ursiana	Ravenna-Cervia	Ravenna, Emilia Romagna	Resurrection of Our Lord	cathedral, minor basilica	cathedral from 5th century, minor basilica from 1733
Recanati Cathedral; Basilica Cattedrale di S. Flaviano	Macerata-Tolentino-Recanati-Cingoli-Treia	Recanati, Macerata, Marche	Saint Flavian of Ricina	co-cathedral, minor basilica	
Reggio Calabria Cathedral; Basilica Cattedrale di Maria SS. Assunta in Cielo	Reggio Calabria-Bova	Reggio Calabria, Calabria	Assumption of the Blessed Virgin Mary	cathedral, minor basilica	
Reggio Emilia Cathedral; Cattedrale di Beata Vergine Assunta	Reggio Emilia-Guastalla	Reggio Emilia, Reggio nell’Emilia, Emilia Romagna	Assumption of the Blessed Virgin Mary	cathedral	
Rieti Cathedral; Cattedrale-Basilica di S. Maria	Rieti	Rieti, Lazio	Saint Mary; Saint Gregory	cathedral, minor basilica	
Rimini Cathedral or Tempio Malatestiano; Tempio Malatestiano	Rimini	Rimini, Emilia Romagna	Saint Francis of Assisi	cathedral, minor basilica	
Ripatransone Cathedral; Basilica Concattedrale di S. Gregorio Magno	San Benedetto del Tronto-Ripatransone-Montalto	Ripatransone, Ascoli Piceno, Marche	Saint Gregory I	co-cathedral, minor basilica	
St. John Lateran (Papal Archbasilica of St. John Lateran); Arcibasilica Papale di Santissimo Salvatore e Santi Giovanni Battista ed Evangelista al Laterano	Rome; cathedral of the Bishop of Rome	Piazza San Giovanni in Laterano 4, Rome, Lazio	Saint John the Evangelist and Saint John the Baptist	patriarchal basilica cathedral, major/papal basilica, pontifical church, parish church; World Heritage Site	
Rossano Cathedral; Cattedrale di Maria SS. Achiropita	Rossano-Cariati	Rossano, Cosenza, Calabria	Saint Mary (Maria SS. Achiropita)	cathedral	
Rovigo Cathedral; Concattedrale di S. Stefano Papa e. M.	Adria-Rovigo	Rovigo, Veneto	Saint Stephen	co-cathedral	
Ruvo Cathedral; Concattedrale di S. Maria Assunta	Molfetta-Ruvo-Giovinazzo-Terlizzi	Ruvo di Puglia, Bari, Apulia	Assumption of the Blessed Virgin Mary	co-cathedral	
Sabina Cathedral; Concattedrale di S. Liberatore Vescovo e Martire	Sabina-Poggio Mirteto	Magliano Sabina, Rieti, Lazio	Saint Liberator	co-cathedral	from 1962
Sala Consilina Cathedral; Duomo di S. Pietro	Teggiano-Policastro	Sala Consilina, Salerno, Campania	Saint Peter	former cathedral, parish church	
Salerno Cathedral; Basilica di S. Matteo (Duomo superiore e Duomo inferiore)	Salerno-Campagna-Acerno	Salerno, Campania	Saint Matthew	cathedral, immemorial minor basilica	
Saluzzo Cathedral; Cattedrale di Maria V. Assunta	Saluzzo	Saluzzo, Cuneo, Piedmont	Assumption of the Blessed Virgin Mary	cathedral	
San Benedetto del Tronto Cathedral; Basilica Cattedrale di S. Maria della Marina	San Benedetto del Tronto-Ripatransone-Montalto	San Benedetto del Tronto, Ascoli Piceno, Marche	Saint Mary (S. Maria della Marina)	cathedral, minor basilica	
Basilica of San Gavino, formerly Porto Torres Cathedral	Sassari	Porto Torres, Sardinia	Saint Gabinus	former cathedral, minor basilica	
San Leo Cathedral; Concattedrale di S. Leo	San Marino-Montefeltro	San Leo, Pesaro e Urbino, Marche	Saint Leo	co-cathedral	
San Leone Cathedral; Cattedrale di San Leone	Crotone-Santa Severina	Scandale, Crotone, Calabria	Saint Leo	former cathedral	destroyed, no visible remains
San Marco Argentano Cathedral; Cattedrale di S. Marco	San Marco Argentano-Scalea	San Marco Argentano, Cosenza, Calabria	Saint Mark	cathedral	
San Marino Cathedral; Basilica Concattedrale di S. Marino	San Marino-Montefeltro	San Marino	Saint Marinus	co-cathedral, minor basilica, parish church; World Heritage Site	co-cathedral from 1855
San Miniato Cathedral; Cattedrale di Ss. Maria Assunta e Genesio	San Miniato	San Miniato, Pisa, Tuscany	Assumption of the Blessed Virgin Mary and Saint Genesius	cathedral	from 1622
San Remo Cathedral; Concattedrale di S. Siro	Ventimiglia-San Remo	San Remo, Imperia, Liguria	Saint Syrus of Pavia	co-cathedral	
Sansepolcro Cathedral; Concattedrale di S. Giovanni Evangelista	Arezzo-Cortona-Sansepolcro	Sansepolcro, Arezzo, Tuscany	Saint John the Evangelist	co-cathedral, minor basilica	
San Severino Cathedral; Concattedrale di S. Agostino; Duomo nuovo	Camerino-San Severino Marche	San Severino Marche, Macerata, Marche	Saint Augustine	co-cathedral; cathedral of the then Diocese of San Severino from 1827	
Old San Severino Cathedral; Chiesa di S. Severino; Duomo vecchio	Camerino-San Severino Marche	San Severino Marche, Macerata, Marche	Saint Severinus	former cathedral, parish church; cathedral of the then Diocese of San Severino until 1827	
San Severo Cathedral; Cattedrale di S. Maria Assunta	San Severo	San Severo, Foggia, Apulia	Assumption of the Blessed Virgin Mary	cathedral	
Sant'Agata de' Goti Cathedral; Concattedrale di S. Maria Assunta	Cerreto Sannita-Telese-Sant'Agata de' Goti	Sant'Agata de' Goti, Benevento, Campania	Assumption of the Blessed Virgin Mary	co-cathedral	
Sant'Angelo Cathedral; Cattedrale di S. Michele Arcangelo	Sant'Angelo dei Lombardi-Conza-Nusco-Bisaccia	Sant'Angelo dei Lombardi, Avellino, Campania	Saint Michael	cathedral	
Sant'Angelo in Vado Cathedral; Basilica Concattedrale di S. Michele Arcangelo	Urbino-Urbania-Sant'Angelo in Vado	Sant'Angelo in Vado, Pesaro e Urbino, Marche	Saint Michael	co-cathedral, minor basilica, shrine	
Santa Giusta Cathedral; Duomo di S. Giusta	Oristano	Santa Giusta, Oristano, Sardinia	Saint Justa	former cathedral, minor basilica	
Santa Lucia del Mela Cathedral; Concattedrale di S. Maria Assunta	Messina-Lipari-Santa Lucia del Mela	Santa Lucia del Mela, Messina, Sicily	Assumption of the Blessed Virgin Mary	co-cathedral	
Santa Severina Cathedral; Concattedrale di S. Maria Maggiore	Crotone-Santa Severina	Santa Severina, Crotone, Calabria	Saint Mary Major	co-cathedral	
Sarno Cathedral; Concattedrale di S. Michele Arcangelo	Nocera Inferiore-Sarno	Sarno, Salerno, Campania	Saint Michael	co-cathedral	
Sarsina Cathedral; Concattedrale di SS. Annunziata, S. Vicinio	Cesena-Sarsina	Sarsina, Forlì-Cesena, Emilia Romagna	Annunciation of the Blessed Virgin Mary and Saint Vicinius	co-cathedral, minor basilica	
Sarzana Cathedral; Concattedrale Basilica di S. Maria Assunta	La Spezia-Sarzana-Brugnato	Sarzana, La Spezia, Liguria	Assumption of the Blessed Virgin Mary	co-cathedral, minor basilica	from early 13th century, replacing Luni
Sassari Cathedral; Cattedrale di S. Nicola di Bari	Sassari	Sassari, Sardinia	Saint Nicholas of Bari	cathedral	
Savona Cathedral; Cattedrale di Nostra Signora Assunta	Savona-Noli	Savona, Liguria	Assumption of the Blessed Virgin Mary	cathedral, minor basilica	
Scala Cathedral; Duomo di S. Lorenzo	Amalfi-Cava de' Tirreni	Scala, Salerno, Campania	Saint Lawrence	former cathedral, parish church	
Segni Cathedral; Concattedrale di S. Maria Assunta	Velletri-Segni	Segni, Rome, Lazio	Assumption of the Blessed Virgin Mary	co-cathedral	
Senigallia Cathedral; Basilica Cattedrale di S. Pietro Apostolo	Senigallia	Senigallia, Ancona, Marche	Saint Peter	cathedral, minor basilica	
Sessa Arunca Cathedral; Cattedrale di Ss. Pietro e Paolo	Sessa Aurunca	Sessa Aurunca, Caserta, Campania	Saint Peter and Saint Paul	cathedral	
Sezze Cathedral; Concattedrale di S. Maria	Latina-Terracina-Sezze-Priverno	Sezze, Latina, Lazio	Saint Mary	co-cathedral	
Siena Cathedral; Cattedrale di S. Maria Assunta	Siena-Colle di Val d'Elsa-Montalcino	Siena, Tuscany	Assumption of the Blessed Virgin Mary	cathedral; World Heritage Site	
Siponto Cathedral, now the Basilica of Santa Maria Maggiore di Siponto; Cattedrale di Siponto, Basilica di Santa Maria Maggiore di Siponto	Manfredonia-Vieste-San Giovanni Rotondo	Siponto, Foggia, Apulia	Saint Mary Major (Madonna of Siponto) (Maria Santissima di Siponto)	former cathedral, minor basilica	
Sora Cathedral; Cattedrale di S. Maria Assunta	Sora-Aquino-Pontecorvo	Sora, Frosinone, Lazio	Assumption of the Blessed Virgin Mary	cathedral	
Sorrento Cathedral; Cattedrale di Ss. Filippo e Giacomo	Sorrento-Castellammare di Stabia	Sorrento, Naples, Campania	Saint Philip and Saint James	cathedral	
Sorres Cathedral, now the Abbey of San Pietro di Sorres; Cattedrale di San Pietro di Sorres	Sassari	Borutta, Sardinia	Saint Peter	former cathedral; abbey church	
Sovana Cathedral; Concattedrale di S. Pietro Apostolo	Pitigliano-Sovana-Orbetello	Sovana in Sorano, Grosseto, Tuscany	Saint Peter	co-cathedral	
Spello Cathedral; Duomo di S. Maria Maggiore	Foligno	Spello, Perugia, Umbria	Saint Mary Major	former cathedral, collegiate church	
Spoleto Cathedral; Cattedrale di S. Maria Assunta	Spoleto-Norcia	Spoleto, Perugia, Umbria	Assumption of the Blessed Virgin Mary; previously to Saint Primianus	cathedral	
Squillace Cathedral; Concattedrale di S. Maria Assunta	Catanzaro-Squillace	Squillace, Catanzaro, Calabria	Assumption of the Blessed Virgin Mary	co-cathedral	
Strongoli Cathedral; Ex-cattedrale di Ss. Pietro e Paolo	Crotone-Santa Severina	Strongoli, Crotone, Calabria	Saint Peter and Saint Paul	former cathedral, collegiate church	
Subiaco Abbey; Basilica Cattedrale di S. Scolastica	Territorial Abbey of Subiaco	Subiaco, Rome, Lazio	Saint Scholastica	abbey church, immemorial minor basilica	territorial abbey
Suelli Cathedral; Duomo di SS. Pietro e Giorgio	Cagliari	Suelli, Cagliari, Sardinia	Saint Peter and Saint George of Suelli	former cathedral, parish church	
Sulci Cathedral, now the Basilica of Sant'Antioco	Iglesias	Sant'Antioco, Sardinia	Saint Antiochus of Sulcis	former cathedral, minor basilica	cathedral of the Diocese of Sulcis from the 5th to the early 13th century, when seat moved to Tratalias
Sulmona Cathedral; Basilica Cattedrale di S. Panfilo Vescovo	Sulmona-Valva	Sulmona, L’Aquila, Abruzzo	Saint Pamphilus	cathedral, minor basilica	
Susa Cathedral; Cattedrale di S. Giusto	Susa	Susa, Turin, Piedmont	Saint Justus of Novalesa	cathedral	
Sutri Cathedral; Concattedrale di S. Maria Assunta in Cielo	Civita Castellana	Sutri, Viterbo, Lazio	Assumption of the Blessed Virgin Mary	co-cathedral	
Syracuse Cathedral; Cattedrale della Natività di Maria Santissima	Syracuse	Syracuse, Sicily	Nativity of the Blessed Virgin Mary	cathedral	
Taormina Cathedral, now the Basilica of San Nicolò di Bari, Taormina; Basilica S. Nicolò di Bari	Messina-Lipari-Santa Lucia del Mela	Taormina, Messina, Sicily	Saint Nicholas of Bari	former cathedral, minor basilica	
Taranto Cathedral; Basilica Cattedrale di S. Cataldo	Taranto	Taranto, Apulia	Saint Catald	cathedral, minor basilica	
Tarquinia Cathedral; Concattedrale di Ss. Margherita e Martino	Civitavecchia-Tarquinia	Tarquinia, Viterbo, Lazio	Saint Margaret and Saint Martin	co-cathedral	
Teano Cathedral; Cattedrale di S. Clemente	Teano-Calvi	Teano, Caserta, Campania	Saint Clement	cathedral	
Church of San Paride ad Fontem; Chiesa di S. Paride ad fontem	Teano-Calvi	Teano, Caserta, Campania	Saint Paris	former cathedral, parish church	
Teggiano Cathedral; Cattedrale di S. Maria Maggiore e S. Michele Arcangelo	Teggiano-Policastro	Teggiano, Salerno, Campania	Saint Mary Major and Saint Michael	cathedral	
Telese Cathedral; Cattedrale della Santa Croce	Cerreto Sannita-Telese-Sant'Agata de' Goti	Telese Terme, Benevento, Campania	Holy Cross	former cathedral	in ruins
Tempio Cathedral; Cattedrale di S. Pietro Apostolo	Tempio-Ampurias	Tempio Pausania, Olbia-Tempio, Sardinia	Saint Peter	cathedral	
Teramo Cathedral; Basilica Cattedrale di S. Maria Assunta	Teramo-Atri	Teramo, Abruzzo	Assumption of the Blessed Virgin Mary	cathedral, minor basilica	
Terlizzi Cathedral; Concattedrale di S. Michele Arcangelo	Molfetta-Ruvo-Giovinazzo-Terlizzi	Terlizzi, Bari, Apulia	Saint Michael	co-cathedral	
Termoli Cathedral; Basilica Cattedrale di Santa Maria della Purificazione or di S. Basso e S. Timoteo	Termoli-Larino	Termoli, Campobasso, Molise	Purification of the Blessed Virgin Mary; commonly ascribed to Saints Bassus and Timothy	cathedral, minor basilica	
Terni Cathedral; Cattedrale di S. Maria Assunta	Terni-Narni-Amelia	Terni, Umbria	Assumption of the Blessed Virgin Mary	cathedral	
Terracina Cathedral; Concattedrale dei SS. Cesareo e Pietro	Latina-Terracina-Sezze-Priverno	Terracina, Latina, Lazio	Saint Caesarius of Terracina and Saint Peter	co-cathedral	
Terralba Cathedral; Concattedrale di S. Pietro Apostolo	Ales-Terralba	Terralba, Oristano, Sardinia	Saint Peter	co-cathedral	
Tivoli Cathedral; Insigne Basilica Cattedrale di S. Lorenzo M.	Tivoli	Tivoli, Roma, Lazio	Saint Lawrence	cathedral	
Todi Cathedral; Basilica Concattedrale di S. Maria Annunziata	Orvieto-Todi	Todi, Perugia, Umbria	Annunciation of the Blessed Virgin Mary	co-cathedral, minor basilica	
Tolentino Cathedral; Basilica Concattedrale di S. Catervo	Macerata-Tolentino-Recanati-Cingoli-Treia	Tolentino, Macerata, Marche	Saint Catervus (possibly also Assumption of the Blessed Virgin Mary)	co-cathedral, minor basilica	
Basilica of St. Nicholas, Tolentino; Basilica S. Nicola di Tolentino	Macerata-Tolentino-Recanati-Cingoli-Treia	Tolentino, Macerata, Marche	Saint Nicholas	former cathedral, minor basilica, shrine	
Church of San Andrea Apostolo, Tortolì, formerly Tortolì Cathedral; Chiesa di Sant'Andrea Apostolo, Tortolì	Ogliastra	Tortolì, Sardinia	Saint Andrew	former cathedral, parish church	bishop's seat transferred to Lanusei in 1927
Tortona Cathedral; Cattedrale di S. Maria Assunta e. S. Lorenzo	Tortona	Tortona, Alessandria, Piedmont	Assumption of the Blessed Virgin Mary and Saint Lawrence	cathedral	
Trani Cathedral; Cattedrale di S. Nicola Pellegrino	Trani-Barletta-Bisceglie	Trani, Barletta-Andria-Trani, Apulia	Saint Nicholas the Pilgrim	cathedral, minor basilica	
Trapani Cathedral; Basilica Cattedrale di S. Lorenzo Martire	Trapani	Trapani, Sicily	Saint Lawrence	cathedral, immemorial minor basilica	
Tratalias Cathedral; Cattedrale di Santa Maria di Monserrato	Iglesias	Tratalias, Sardinia	Saint Mary of Montserrat	former cathedral, parish church	cathedral of the Diocese of Sulcis from the early 13th century to 1503, when replaced by Iglesias
Treia Cathedral; Concattedrale di SS. Annunziata	Macerata-Tolentino-Recanati-Cingoli-Treia	Treia, Macerata, Marche	Annunciation of the Blessed Virgin Mary	co-cathedral	
Trento Cathedral; Basilica Cattedrale di S. Vigilio Vescovo	Trento	Trento, Trentino-Alto Adige/South Tyrol	Saint Vigilius	cathedral, minor basilica	
Trevi Cathedral; Duomo di S. Emiliano	Perugia-Città della Pieve	Trevi, Umbria	Saint Emilianus	former cathedral, parish church	
Treviso Cathedral; Cattedrale di S. Pietro Apostolo	Treviso	Treviso, Veneto	Saint Peter	cathedral	
Tricarico Cathedral; Cattedrale di S. Maria Assunta	Tricarico	Tricarico, Matera, Basilicata	Assumption of the Blessed Virgin Mary	cathedral	
Trieste Cathedral; Basilica Cattedrale di S. Giusto Martire	Trieste	Trieste, Friuli-Venezia Giulia	Saint Justus	cathedral, minor basilica	
Trivento Cathedral; Cattedrale di Ss. Nazaro, Celso e Vittore	Trivento	Trivento, Campobasso, Molise	Saints Nazarius, Celsus and Victor	cathedral	
Troia Cathedral; Concattedrale di Maria SS. Assunta	Lucera-Troia	Troia, Foggia, Apulia	Assumption of the Blessed Virgin Mary	co-cathedral, minor basilica	
Tropea Cathedral; Concattedrale di Maria SS. di Romania	Mileto-Nicotera-Tropea	Tropea, Vibo Valentia, Calabria	Saint Mary (Maria SS. di Romania)	co-cathedral	
Turin Cathedral; Cattedrale Metropolitana di S. Giovanni Battista	Turin	Turin, Piedmont	Saint John the Baptist	cathedral, shrine	
Tursi Cathedral; Cattedrale di Maria SS. Annunziata	Tursi-Lagonegro	Tursi, Matera, Basilicata	Annunciation of the Blessed Virgin Mary	cathedral	
Basilica of Santa Maria Maggiore, Tuscania; Basilica di Santa Maria Maggiore	Viterbo	Tuscania, Viterbo, Lazio	Saint Mary Major	former cathedral, co-cathedral	
Tuscania Cathedral or Church of San Giacomo; Cattedrale di San Giacomo Maggiore	Viterbo	Tuscania, Viterbo, Lazio	Saint James the Great	co-cathedral	
Church of Santa Maria della Rosa, Tuscania; Chiesa di Santa Maria della Rosa	Viterbo	Tuscania, Viterbo, Lazio	Saint Mary	former co-cathedral	
Church of San Pietro, Tuscania; Chiesa di San Pietro	Viterbo	Tuscania, Viterbo, Lazio	Saint Peter	former cathedral, parish church	
Udine Cathedral; Cattedrale di S. Maria Annunziata nella Chiesa Metropolitana	Udine	Udine, Friuli-Venezia Giulia	Annunciation of the Blessed Virgin Mary	cathedral	
Ugento Cathedral; Cattedrale di Maria SS. Assunta in Cielo	Ugento-Santa Maria di Leuca	Ugento, Lecce, Apulia	Assumption of the Blessed Virgin Mary	cathedral	
Umbriatico Cathedral, now the Basilica of St Donatus of Evorea; Basilica di S. Donato Vescovo	Crotone-Santa Severina	Umbriatico, Crotone, Calabria	Saint Donatus, Bishop of Evorea	former cathedral, minor basilica	
Urbania Cathedral; Concattedrale di S. Cristoforo Martire	Urbino-Urbania-Sant'Angelo in Vado	Urbania, Pesaro e Urbino, Marche	Saint Christopher	co-cathedral	
Urbino Cathedral; Basilica Cattedrale di S. Maria Assunta	Urbino-Urbania-Sant'Angelo in Vado	Urbino, Pesaro e Urbino, Marche	Assumption of the Blessed Virgin Mary	cathedral, minor basilica; World Heritage Site	
Vallo Cathedral; Cattedrale di S. Pantaleone	Vallo della Lucania	Vallo della Lucania, Salerno, Campania	Saint Pantaleon	cathedral	
Vasto Cathedral; Concattedrale di S. Giuseppe	Chieti-Vasto	Vasto, Chieti, Abruzzo	Saint Joseph	co-cathedral	
Velletri Cathedral; Basilica Cattedrale di S. Clemente I	Velletri-Segni	Velletri, Rome, Lazio	Saint Clement I	cathedral, minor basilica	
Venafro Cathedral; Concattedrale di S. Maria Assunta	Isernia-Venafro	Venafro, Isernia, Molise	Assumption of the Blessed Virgin Mary	co-cathedral	
St. Mark's Basilica; Basilica Cattedrale Patriachale di S. Marco	Venice	Piazza San Marco, Venice, Veneto	Saint Mark	cathedral, immemorial minor basilica; World Heritage Site	cathedral from 1807
Basilica of San Pietro di Castello; Basilica Concattedrale di S. Pietro di Castello	Venice	San Pietro di Castello, Venice, Veneto	Saint Peter	co-cathedral, immemorial minor basilica; World Heritage Site	cathedral 1451–1807, co-cathedral from 1807
Greek Orthodox Cathedral, Venice; San Giorgio dei Greci	Greek Orthodox Archdiocese of Italy	Castello, Venice, Veneto	Saint George	cathedral	Greek Orthodox, from 1991
Torcello Cathedral; Basilica Cattedrale di S. Maria Assunta	Venice	Torcello, Venice, Veneto	Assumption of the Blessed Virgin Mary	former cathedral, immemorial minor basilica, parish church; World Heritage Site	
Venosa Cathedral; Concattedrale di S. Andrea	Melfi-Rapolla-Venosa	Venosa, Potenza, Basilicata	Saint Andrew	co-cathedral	
Ventimiglia Cathedral; Cattedrale di Nostra Signora Assunta	Ventimiglia-San Remo	Ventimiglia, Imperia, Liguria	Assumption of the Blessed Virgin Mary	cathedral	
Vercelli Cathedral; Cattedrale-Basilica di S. Eusebio	Vercelli	Vercelli, Piedmont	Saint Eusebius	cathedral, minor basilica	
Veroli Cathedral; Concattedrale di S. Andrea Apostolo	Frosinone-Veroli-Ferentino	Veroli, Frosinone, Lazio	Saint Andrew	co-cathedral	
Verona Cathedral; Cattedrale di S. Maria Assunta	Verona	Verona, Veneto	Assumption of the Blessed Virgin Mary	cathedral; World Heritage Site	
Vicenza Cathedral; Cattedrale di S. Maria Annunziata	Vicenza	Vicenza, Veneto	Annunciation of the Blessed Virgin Mary	cathedral; World Heritage Site	
Vieste Cathedral; Basilica Cattedrale di Maria Santissima Assunta in cielo	Manfredonia-Vieste-San Giovanni Rotondo	Vieste, Foggia, Apulia	Assumption of the Blessed Virgin Mary	co-cathedral, minor basilica	
Vigevano Cathedral; Cattedrale di Sant'Ambrogio	Vigevano	Vigevano, Pavia, Lombardy	Saint Ambrose	cathedral	
Viterbo Cathedral; Basilica Cattedrale di S. Lorenzo Martire	Viterbo	Viterbo, Lazio	Saint Lawrence	cathedral, minor basilica	
Vittorio Veneto Cathedral; Cattedrale di S. Maria Assunta	Vittorio Veneto	Vittorio Veneto, Treviso, Veneto	Assumption of the Blessed Virgin Mary	cathedral	
Volterra Cathedral; Basilica Cattedrale di S. Maria Assunta	Volterra	Volterra, Pisa, Tuscany	Assumption of the Blessed Virgin Mary	cathedral, minor basilica	

== Non-diocesan churches commonly referred to as cathedrals ==
Carrara Cathedral; Duomo di Carrara, Collegiata Abbazia Mitrata di Sant'Andrea Apostolo	Massa Carrara-Pontremoli	Carrara, Tuscany	Saint Andrew	collegiate church
Monza Cathedral; Duomo di Monza, Basilica di San Giovanni Battista	Milan	Monza, Milan, Lombardy	Saint John the Baptist	immemorial minor basilica
Pietrasanta Cathedral; Duomo di Pietrasanta, Collegiata di San Martino	Lucca	Pietrasanta, Lucca, Tuscany	Saint Martin	collegiate church
Ripacandida Cathedral; Chiesa Madre; Cattedrale or Chiesa di Santa Maria del Sepolcro	Melfi-Rapolla-Venosa	Ripacandida, Potenza, Basilicata	Saint Mary of the Tomb; Santa Maria del Sepolcro	parish church
Sermoneta Cathedral or Collegiate Church of Santa Maria Assunta, Sermoneta; Cattedrale or Collegiata di Santa Maria Assunta	Latina-Terracina-Sezze-Priverno	Sermoneta, Latina, Lazio	Assumption of the Virgin Mary; Santa Maria Assunta	collegiate church

== See also ==
- Cathedral
- List of cathedrals
- List of Catholic dioceses in Italy
- List of basilicas in Italy

== Sources and external links ==
- GCatholic.org.com: Cathedrals in Italy
