= Persio =

Persio is a surname. Notable people with the surname include:

- Altobello Persio (1507–1593), Italian sculptor, father of Antonio
- Antonio Persio (1542–1612), Italian philosopher
- Pietro Persio (died 1578), Italian Roman Catholic prelate
