= Antonello Eustachi =

Most Reverend Antonello Eustachi
- Bishop of Lesina
- Church: Catholic Church
- Diocese: Diocese of Lesina
- Predecessor: Guglielmo Adeodato
- Successor: Baldassare Marachi

Personal details
- Died: 1544 Lesina, Italy

Antonello Eustachi (died 1544) was a Roman Catholic prelate who served as Bishop of Lesina (1540–1544).

== Biography ==
On 16 April 1540, Antonello Eustachi was appointed during the papacy of Pope Paul III as Bishop of Lesina. He served as Bishop of Lesina until his death in 1544.

== See also ==
- Catholic Church in Italy

Catholic Church titles
| Preceded by Guglielmo Adeodato | Bishop of Lesina; 1540–1544 | Succeeded by Baldassare Marachi |
