= Francesco Nomicisi =

Most Reverend Francesco Nomicisi
- Bishop of Lesina
- Church: Catholic Church
- Diocese: Diocese of Lesina
- In office: 1504–1507
- Successor: Luca Matteo Caracciolo

Personal details
- Died: 1507 Lesina, Italy

Francesco Nomicisi (died 1507) was a Roman Catholic prelate who served as Bishop of Lesina (1504–1507).

== Biography ==
On 29 April 1504, Francesco Nomicisi was appointed during the papacy of Pope Julius II as Bishop of Lesina. He served as Bishop of Lesina until his death in 1507.

Catholic Church titles
Preceded by	Bishop of Lesina; 1504–1507	Succeeded by Luca Matteo Caracciolo
