= Guglielmo Adeodato =

Most Reverend Guglielmo Adeodato
- Bishop of Lesina
- Church: Catholic Church
- Diocese: Diocese of Lesina
- In office: 1539–1540
- Predecessor: Vincenzo Torelli
- Successor: Antonello Eustachi

Personal details
- Died: 1540 Lesina, Italy

Guglielmo Adeodato (died 1540) was a Roman Catholic prelate who served as Bishop of Lesina (1539–1540).

== Biography ==
On 17 October 1539, Guglielmo Adeodato was appointed during the papacy of Paul III as Bishop of Lesina. He served as Bishop of Lesina until his death in 1540.

Catholic Church titles
Preceded by Vincenzo Torelli	Bishop of Lesina; 1539–1540	Succeeded by Antonello Eustachi
