= Vincenzo Torelli =

Roman Catholic prelate (died 1539)

Most Reverend Vincenzo Torelli
- Bishop of Lesina
- Church: Catholic Church
- Diocese: Diocese of Lesina
- In office: 1538–1539
- Predecessor: Antonio Pandella
- Successor: Guglielmo Adeodato

Personal details
- Died: 1539 Lesina, Italy

Vincenzo Torelli (died 1539) was a Roman Catholic prelate who served as Bishop of Lesina (1538–1539).

On 7 October 1538, Vincenzo Torelli was appointed during the papacy of Pope Paul III as Bishop of Lesina. He served as Bishop of Lesina until his death in 1539.

Catholic Church titles
| Preceded by Antonio Pandella | Bishop of Lesina; 1538–1539 | Succeeded by Guglielmo Adeodato |
