= Baldassare Marachi =

Roman Catholic prelate (died 1540)

Most Reverend Guglielmo Adeodato
- Bishop of Lesina
- Church: Catholic Church
- Diocese: Diocese of Lesina
- In office: 1539–1540
- Predecessor: Antonello Eustachi
- Successor: Orazio Greco

Personal details
- Died: 1540 Lesina, Italy

Guglielmo Adeodato, O.E.S.A. or Baldassare Monaco (died 1540) was a Roman Catholic prelate who served as Bishop of Lesina (1539–1540).

== Biography ==
Guglielmo Adeodato was ordained a priest in the Order of Hermits of St. Augustine. On 17 October 1539, he was appointed during the papacy of Pope Paul III as Bishop of Lesina. He served as Bishop of Lesina until his death in 1540.

Catholic Church titles
Preceded by Antonello Eustachi	Bishop of Lesina; 1539–1540	Succeeded by Orazio Greco
