= Giacomo da Mantova =

Most Reverend Giacomo da Mantova
- Bishop of Lesina
- Church: Catholic Church
- Diocese: Diocese of Lesina
- In office: 1526–1528
- Predecessor: Luca Matteo Caracciolo
- Successor: Antonio Pandella

Personal details
- Died: 1528 Lesina, Italy

Giacomo da Mantova, O.P. or Giacomo de Mantova (died 1528) was a Roman Catholic prelate who served as Bishop of Lesina (1526–1528).

== Biography ==
Giacomo da Mantova was ordained a priest in the Order of Preachers. On 27 April 1526, he was appointed during the papacy of Pope Clement VII as Bishop of Lesina. He served as Bishop of Lesina until his death in 1528.

Catholic Church titles
| Preceded by Luca Matteo Caracciolo | Bishop of Lesina; 1526–1528 | Succeeded by Antonio Pandella |
