= Antonio Pandella =

Most Reverend Antonio Pandella
- Bishop of Lesina
- Church: Catholic Church
- Diocese: Diocese of Lesina
- In office: 1528–1538
- Predecessor: Giacomo de Mantova
- Successor: Vincenzo Torelli

Personal details
- Died: 1538 Lesina, Italy

Antonio Pandella (died 1538) was a Roman Catholic prelate who served as Bishop of Lesina (1528–1538).

== Biography ==
On 11 December 1528, Antonio Pandella was appointed during the papacy of Pope Clement VII as Bishop of Lesina. He served as Bishop of Lesina until his death in 1538.

Catholic Church titles
Preceded by Giacomo de Mantova	Bishop of Lesina; 1528–1538	Succeeded by Vincenzo Torelli
