= Luca Matteo Caracciolo =

Roman Catholic bishop

Most Reverend Luca Matteo Caracciolo
- Bishop of Lesina
- Church: Catholic Church
- Diocese: Diocese of Lesina
- In office: 1507–1526
- Predecessor: Francesco Nomicisi
- Successor: Giacomo de Mantova

Personal details
- Died: 1526 Lesina, Italy

Luca Matteo Caracciolo (died 1526) was a Roman Catholic prelate who served as Bishop of Lesina (1507–1526).

== Biography ==
On 4 August 1507, Luca Matteo Caracciolo was appointed during the papacy of Pope Julius II as Bishop of Lesina. He served as Bishop of Lesina until his death in 1526.

Catholic Church titles
Preceded by Francesco Nomicisi	Bishop of Lesina; 1507–1526	Succeeded by Giacomo de Mantova
