= Altobello Persio =

Italian sculptor

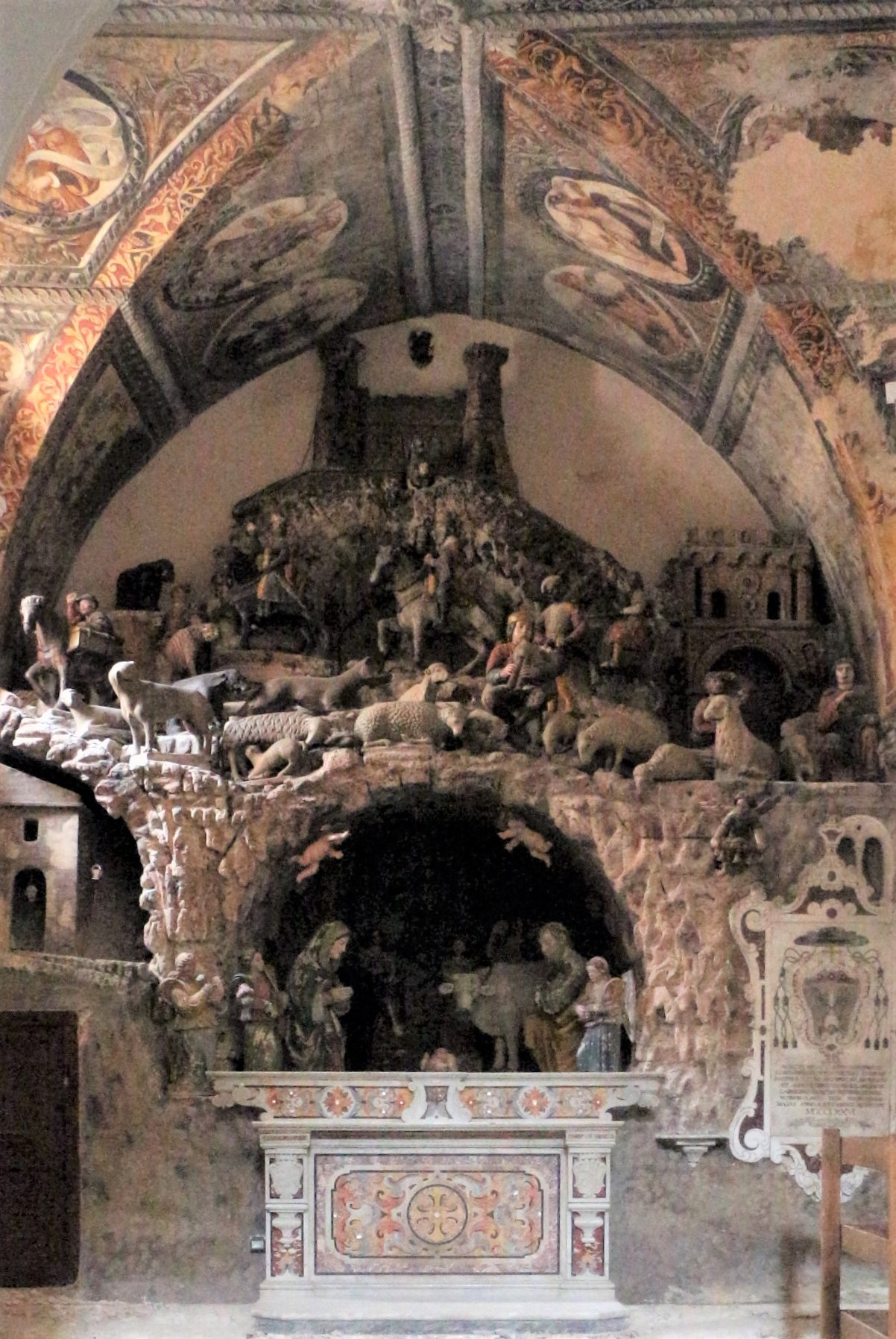
The stone nativity scene in the Cathedral of Matera.

Altobello Persio (1507-1593) was an Italian sculptor. He was the father of Antonio, a philosopher, Ascanio, a humanist, Domizio, a painter, and Giulio Persio, a sculptor.

== Biography ==
Persio was born at Montescaglioso. His first known works were sculptures in the local Abbey of San Michele Arcangelo, such as the Renaissance-style portal. After marrying Beatrice Goffredo, a noblewoman from Matera, he moved to the latter city, where he executed some of his most important works: these include the stone nativity scene and a frontal altar in the Cathedral.

Among his other works are a "Crucifix" and a "Virgin with St. John" in the church of San Nicola at Lagonegro, a "St. Joseph" and "Pietà" in the lunette of the portal of Mother Church of Santa Maria Maggiore at Miglionico (also attributed to his son Giulio), "St. Peter and Paul" in the Mother Church of Oppido Lucano, Isabella and Frederick of Aragon in the Mother church of Ferrandina, and a stone nativity scene in the crypt of della chiesa di Santa Maria Maggiore in the quarter of Rabatana at Tursi.

== Sources ==
- Gelao, Clara (2004). Scultura del Rinascimento in Puglia. Bari: Edipuglia. pp. 36–39.
