= Santa Maria della Manna d'Oro, Spoleto =

Church in Spoleto, Italy

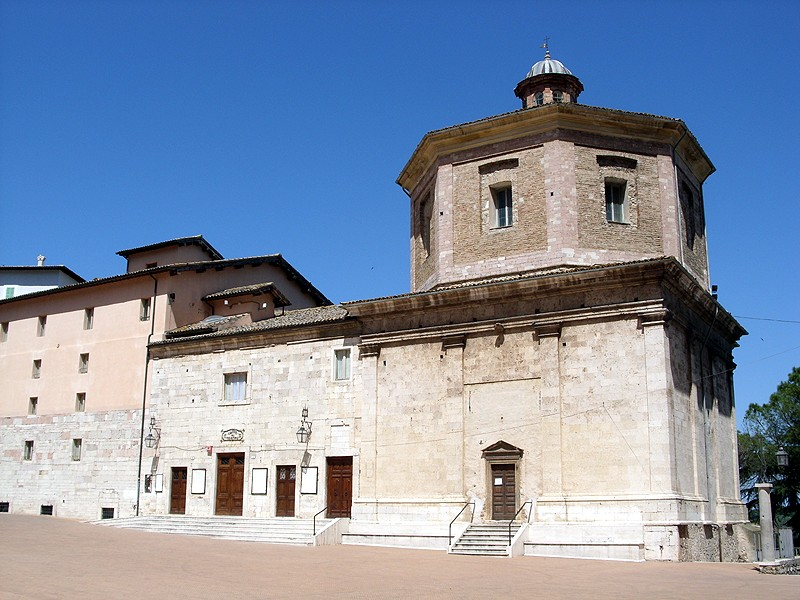
Church of S. Maria della Manna d'Oro

Santa Maria della Manna d'Oro is a renaissance-style, former sanctuary-church located in the center of Spoleto, Province of Perugia, region of Umbria, Italy. The church faces the piazza del Duomo.

A sanctuary dedicated to the Vergine della Misericordia existed at the site, but because it was dilapidated and because the city had escaped sacking by the Imperial troops in 1527, the merchants in the commune decided to refurbish the church. It is also said that Spoleto merchants profited from trading with the imperial forces, hence the surname manna of gold. It was built with an octagonal dome above a plain square base, and the interior space reflects the octagonal layout.

Construction began in 1527, but was not complete until the early 17th century. The interior is now used for exhibition space and houses an elaborate baptismal font originally from the cathedral, and some canvases by Sebastiano Conca. AA.VV.,
