= Orazio Greco =

Most Reverend Orazio Greco
- Bishop of Lesina
- Church: Catholic Church
- Diocese: Diocese of Lesina
- In office: 1551–1567
- Predecessor: Baldassare Marachi
- Successor: None

Orazio Greco was a Roman Catholic prelate who served as Bishop of Lesina (1551–1567).

== Biography ==
On 18 February 1551, Orazio Greco was appointed during the papacy of Pope Julius III as Bishop of Lesina. In 1562 he took part in the Council of Trento and in 1567 at the Provincial Council celebrated in Benevento. The diocese was suppressed in 1567. While bishop, he was the principal co-consecrator of: Giuseppe Pamphilj, Bishop of Segni (1570).

Catholic Church titles
Preceded by Baldassare Marachi	Bishop of Lesina; 1551–1567	Succeeded by None
