= Lagonegro Cathedral =

Roman Catholic cathedral in Basilicata, Italy

Coordinates: 40.1240°N 15.7653°E

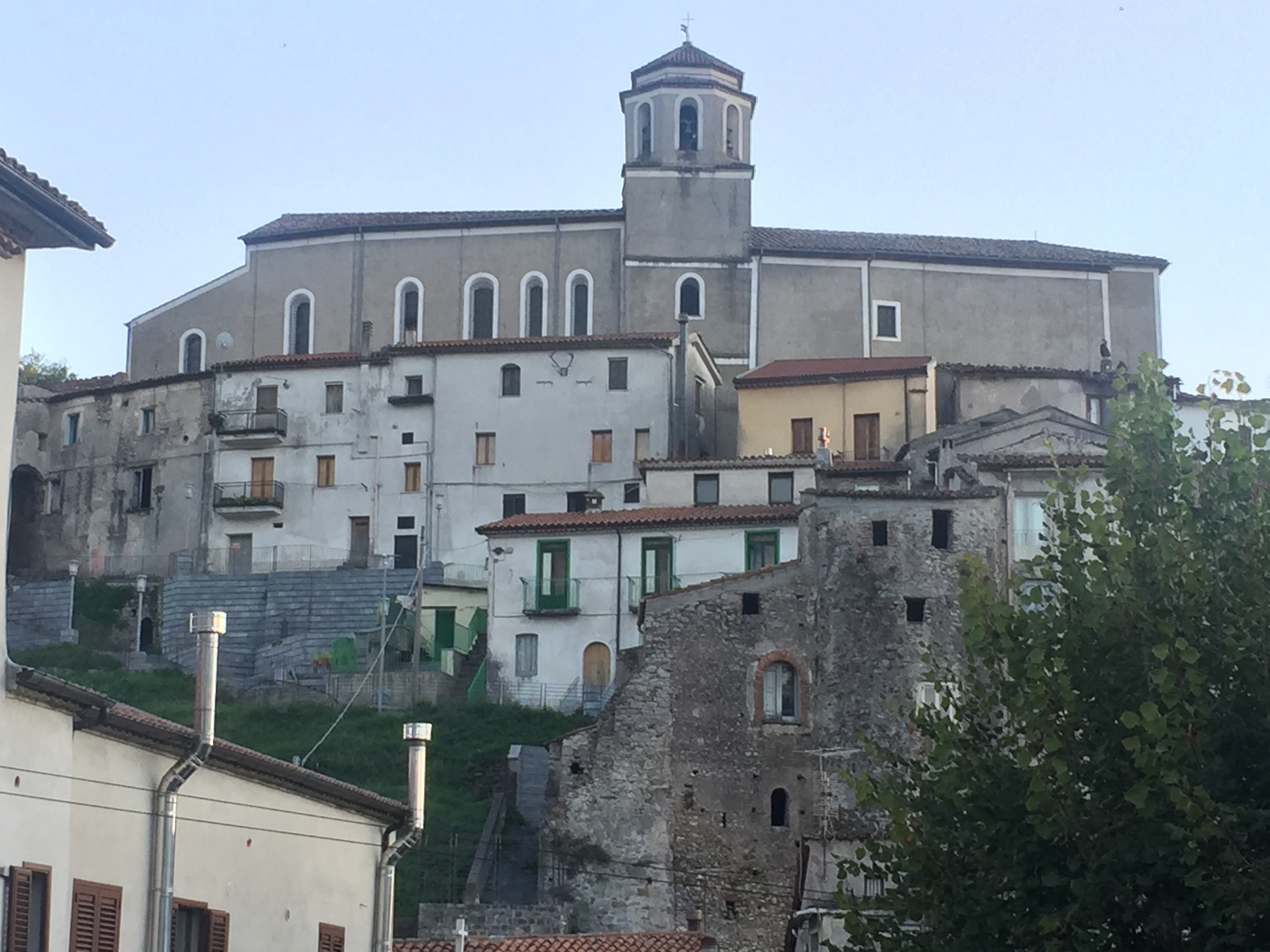
Concathedral of Lagonero.

Lagonegro Cathedral (Italian: Duomo di Lagonegro; Concattedrale di San Nicola di Bari) is a Roman Catholic cathedral dedicated to Saint Nicholas located in the comune of Lagonegro in Basilicata, southern Italy. Since 1976 it has been a co-cathedral of the Roman Catholic Diocese of Tursi-Lagonegro.

== History ==
The church was built in the 9th and 10th centuries, but has been renovated many times since. The interior is very spacious and heterogeneous, owing to several expansions. Treasures include a crucifix by Altobello Persio, a depiction of Mary and the saints by Giovanni Bernardino Azzolini and the main altar, which dates from the 18th century.

Legend has it that the church contains the tomb of Lisa del Giocondo, the subject of the Mona Lisa, who died at Lagonegro in 1506.

== See also ==
- List of cathedrals in Italy
