= Primianus of Larino =

Saint Primianus or Primianus of Larino (Italian: San Primiano or Primiano Martire) (d. 15 May 303 or 304) is the patron saint of Lesina, Apulia, in Italy. He is also joint patron saint, with Saint Pardus, of Larino in the province of Campobasso. His feast day is celebrated in both places on 15 May with fireworks and music, but 28 April is the date elsewhere.

== Life ==
The tradition is that three Christian brothers, Primianus, Firmianus and Castus, were persecuted and put to death during the Persecution of Diocletian on 15 May 303 in the amphitheatre of Larino. Firmianus and Castus were devoured by lions, but Primianus tamed them and was spared. He was later decapitated near the Temple of Mars in Larino.

There is a further legend that in 842 Larino was invaded by Saracens and mostly destroyed. Its citizens were dispersed across the surrounding countryside, and the inhabitants of the city of Lesina were able to take from the ruined church the relics of Primianus, Firmianus and Castus. The citizens of Larino, once it was restored, declared war on Lesina and stormed it to regain the relics. In the confusion they broke into the tomb of Saint Pardus, patron saint of Lesina, and took his relics instead, removing them in a farm cart decorated with flowers.

The former Lesina Cathedral was dedicated to Primianus, and is now a church, containing the Sanctuary of Primianus.

A notable reliquary of some of Primianus's relics is preserved in Acquaviva Collecroce.

== Sources and external links ==
- Santebeati.it: San Primiano (in Italian)
