= Cerignola Cathedral =

Cathedral in Cerignola, Apulia, Italy

Cerignola Cathedral Cattedrale di San Pietro Apostolo (Duomo Tonti)
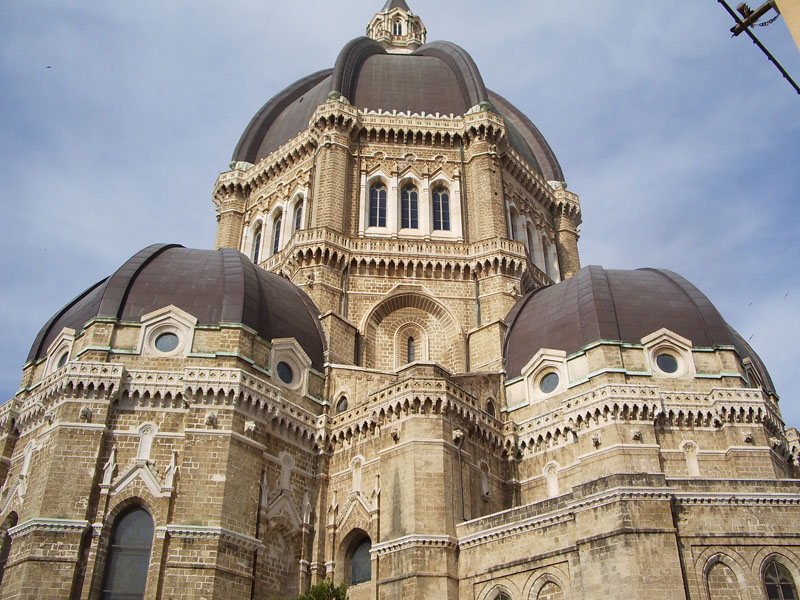

Religion
- Affiliation: Roman Catholic
- Diocese: Diocese of Cerignola-Ascoli Satriano
- Province: Ecclesiastical province of Foggia-Bovino
- Rite: Roman
- Ecclesiastical or organizational status: Cathedral
- Year consecrated: 1934

Location
- Location: Cerignola, Italy
- Interactive map of Cerignola Cathedral; Cattedrale di San Pietro Apostolo (Duomo Tonti)
- Coordinates: 41.264384°N 15.899585°E

Architecture
- Type: Church
- Style: Neogothic
- Groundbreaking: 1912
- Completed: 1934

The Cerignola Cathedral is a Cathedral in Cerignola, Apulia, Italy. While it was funded in the early 19th century, a series of delays pushed the project back by fifty years.

== History ==
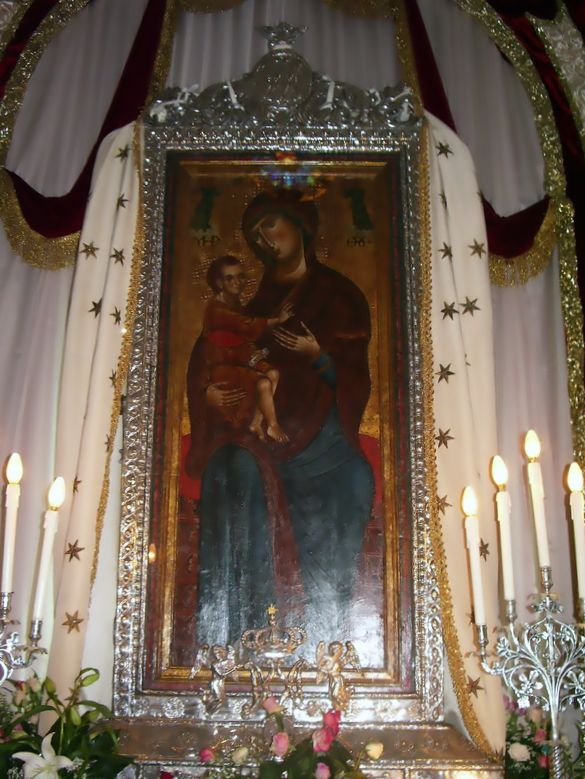
The Byzantine icon of the Madonna of Ripalta.

As the mother church, formerly the cathedral, had become inadequate for the growing population of Cerignola, the need arose to design and construct a new religious building capable of accommodating the city's principal liturgical functions, particularly during major religious celebrations. In 1820 the municipal administration commissioned an initial project estimated at a cost of 70,000 ducats. This was followed in 1845 by a second proposal drafted by the architect Francesco Saponieri. Both projects were rejected for economic reasons. A decisive turning point occurred in 1855, when, upon his death, the wealthy local citizen Paolo Tonti bequeathed to the city the income derived from his estates, expressly for the construction of a new cathedral. The project was once again entrusted to Saponieri, who presented a design costing 190,000 ducats; this, however, was deemed excessively expensive. The commission was then assigned to the engineer Errico Alvino, whose first proposal was likewise considered beyond the city's financial means. Alvino subsequently submitted a second, more modest design, which was approved by the municipal council but opposed by the local population, as its dimensions were only slightly larger than those of the former mother church. Finally, in 1870, after further modifications, Alvino's project was approved with an estimated cost of 127,000 ducats.

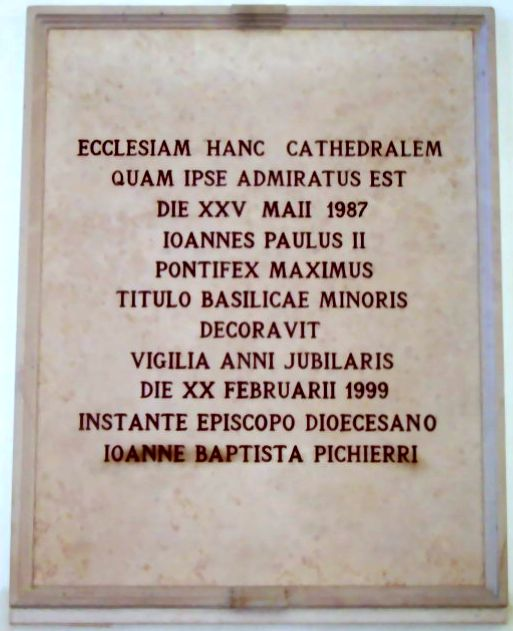
Inscription commemorating the elevation to the rank of Minor basilica.

Construction began on 29 June 1873 with the laying of the foundation stone. Following the death of Errico Alvino in 1876, the direction of the works passed to one of his pupils, the engineer Giuseppe Pisanti, who prepared the definitive executive project. A series of setbacks significantly delayed completion, and the building was inaugurated on 14 September 1934, despite not yet being fully completed. The new church inherited the titles of cathedral and parish of Saint Peter the Apostle from the ancient mother church. The cathedral was closed after the earthquake that struck the city on 23 November 1980. Restoration works, initiated in 1982, included structural consolidation, the reconstruction of the lantern, the replacement of the copper cladding of the domes, and interventions on both the interior and exterior finishes, including the organ. Since 30 September 1986, the church has served as the cathedral of the Roman Catholic Diocese of Cerignola-Ascoli Satriano. On 22 February 1999, following a request submitted on 13 April 1998 by Bishop Giovan Battista Pichierri, it was elevated to the rank of minor basilica"Basilicas in Italy". and dedicated to Saint Peter the Apostle. From the first Saturday after Easter until the second Monday of October, the cathedral houses the icon of the Madonna of Ripalta, the city's principal patron saint.
