= Ascoli Satriano Cathedral =

Cathedral in Ascoli Satriano, Italy

Coordinates: 41.2062°N 15.5610°E

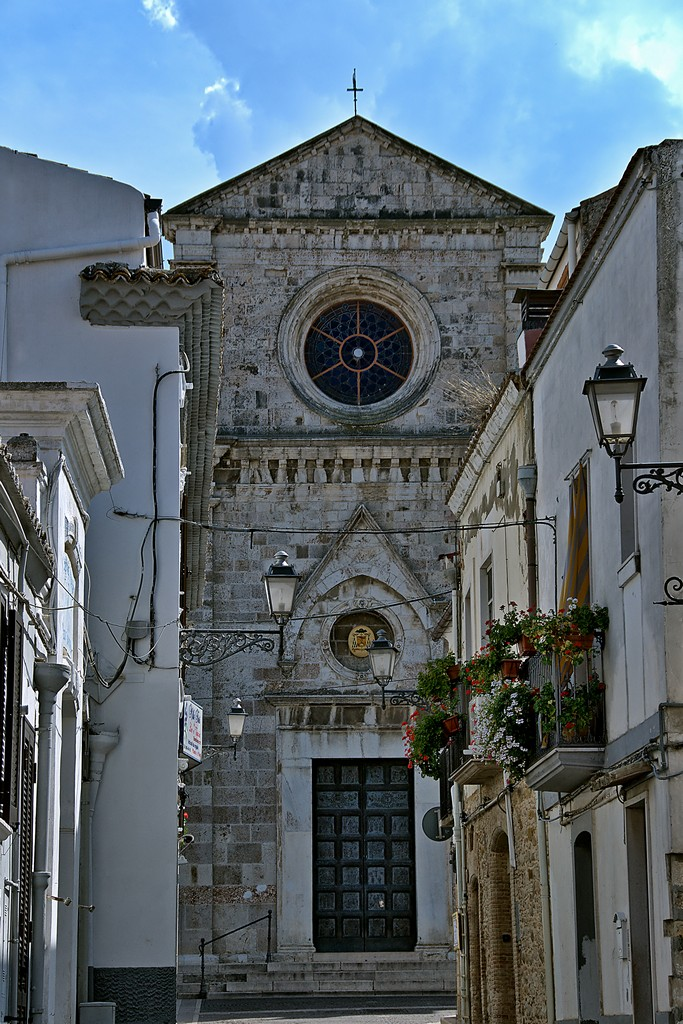
Ascoli Satriano Cathedral

Ascoli Satriano Cathedral (Italian: Duomo di Ascoli Satriano; Concattedrale della Natività della Beata Vergine Maria) is a Roman Catholic cathedral in Ascoli Satriano, Apulia, Italy, dedicated to the Nativity of the Virgin Mary. Formerly the episcopal seat of the Diocese of Ascoli Satriano, it has been since 1986 a co-cathedral in the Diocese of Cerignola-Ascoli Satriano.

== See also ==
- Catholic Church in Italy
