= Nicastro Cathedral =

Church building in Lamezia Terme, Italy

Coordinates: 38.9763°N 16.3205°E

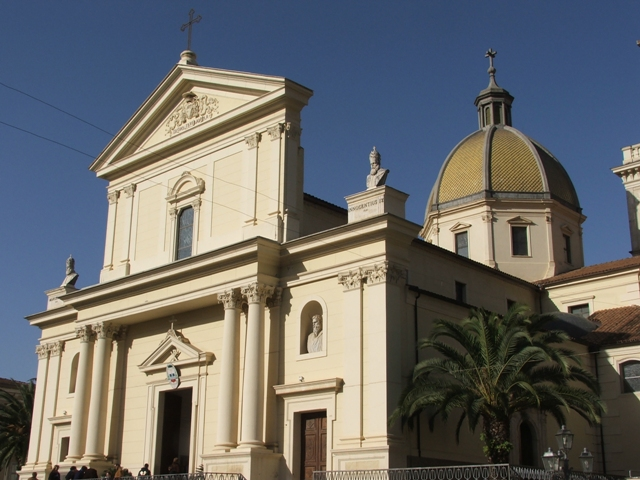
West front

Nicastro Cathedral (Italian: Duomo di Nicastro; Cattedrale dei Santi Pietro e Paolo) is a Roman Catholic cathedral dedicated to Saints Peter and Paul in the town of Nicastro, now part of the city of Lamezia Terme, in the province of Catanzaro, in the Calabria region of southern Italy. It was previously the episcopal seat of the Diocese of Nicastro and when the diocese changed its name to the Diocese of Lamezia Terme, remained its cathedral.

The first church on the site probably dated from the Byzantine era, and was destroyed during Saracen raids prior to the year 1000. The Normans in 1094 erected a church following Latin rites. This cathedral was destroyed by an earthquake on March 7, 1683. A new cathedral was raised from the ruins and completed in 1675. The façade was redone in 1925 in a Neoclassical style. The cupola was completed in 1935. On the façade are busts depicting the titular saints and popes Marcello II (Marcello Cervini; 1539–40) and Innocent IX (Giovanni Maria Facchinetti; 1560–75) who were bishops of Nicastro. The wooden choir stalls of the early 18th century are still present.
