= Roman Catholic Diocese of Lesina =

The Diocese of Lesina (Latin: Dioecesis Lesinensis) was a Roman Catholic diocese located in the town of Lesina on the northern side of Monte Gargano in the province of Foggia, in the Apulia region of southeast Italy. Erected in the 13th century, it was suppressed in 1567 to the Diocese of Larino. It was restored as a titular see in 1968.

== Bishops ==
Suffragan Bishops of Lesina

(all Roman Rite)

- Francesco Titignano, O. Cist. (1400–1408 Died)
- Bartolomeo de Sperella, O.F.M. (1408 – 1409.06.20), later Bishop of Tortiboli (1409.06.20 – 1425.08.31), Bishop of Bovino (Italy) (1425.08.31 – death 1427)
- Nicola Tartagli, O. Cist. (1409.06.20 – death 1459), also Apostolic Administrator of Dragonara (1438.08.01 – ?)
- Nicolò delle Croci (1463.02.10 – death 1473?), previously Bishop of Chioggia (Italy) (1457.10.21 – 1463.02.10)
- Tommaso da Bitonto, O.F.M. (1473.07.09 – death 1482)
- Masello d’Oria (1482.03.11 – ?)
- Leonardo (1488.07.30 – ?), previously Bishop of Balecio (? – 1488.07.30)
- Francesco Nomicisi (1504.04.29 – death 1507)
- Luca Matteo Caracciolo (1507.08.04 – death 1526)
- Giacomo da Mantova, O.P. (1526.04.17 – 1528)
- Antonio Pandella (1528.12.11 – death 1538)
- Vincenzo Torelli (1538.10.09 – death 1538)
- Guglielmo Adeodato (1539.10.17 – 1542)
- Antonello Eustachi (1542.04.16 – death 1544)
- Baldassare Marachi (Baldassare Monaco), O.E.S.A. (1544.06.25 – death 1550)
- Orazio Greco (1551.02.18 – 1567)

=== Titular see ===
In 1968 the diocese was nominally restored as Titular bishopric.

It has had the following incumbents, of the fitting episcopal (lowest) rank :

- Joseph Mary Marling, Holy Ghost Fathers (C.PP.S.) (1969.07.02 – 1976.01.16)
- Emilio Bianchi di Cárcano (1976.02.24 – 1982.04.14)
- João d’Ávila Moreira Lima (1982.06.21 – 2011.09.30)
- Sampathawaduge Maxwell Grenville Silva (2011.11.28 – ...), Auxiliary Bishop of Colombo (Sri Lanka)

== See also ==
- Catholic Church in Italy
