= Antonio Persio =

Italian philosopher

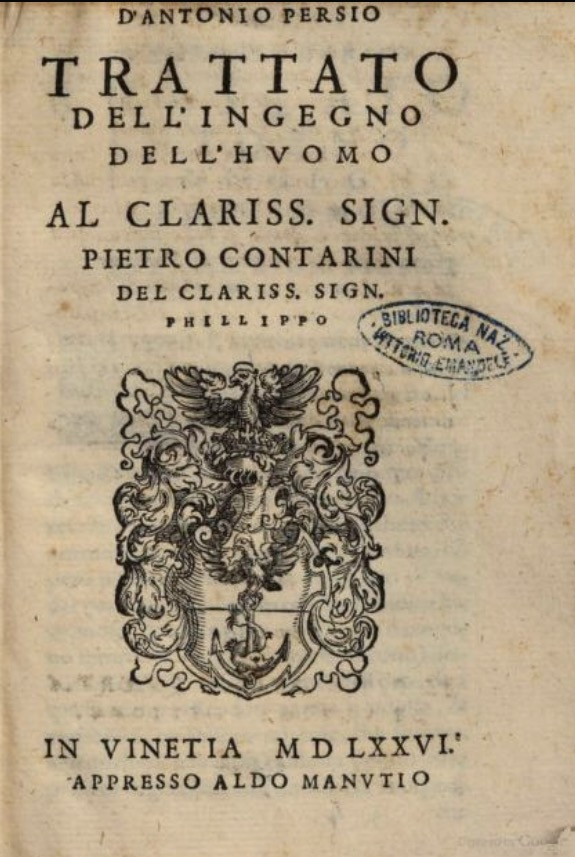
Frontespiece of Antonio Persio's 'Trattato dell'ingegno dell'huomo'

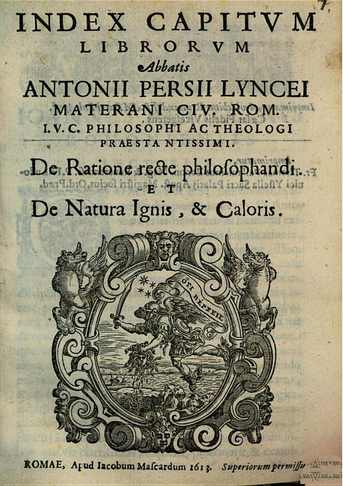
Frontespiece of a collection of Antonio Persio's works

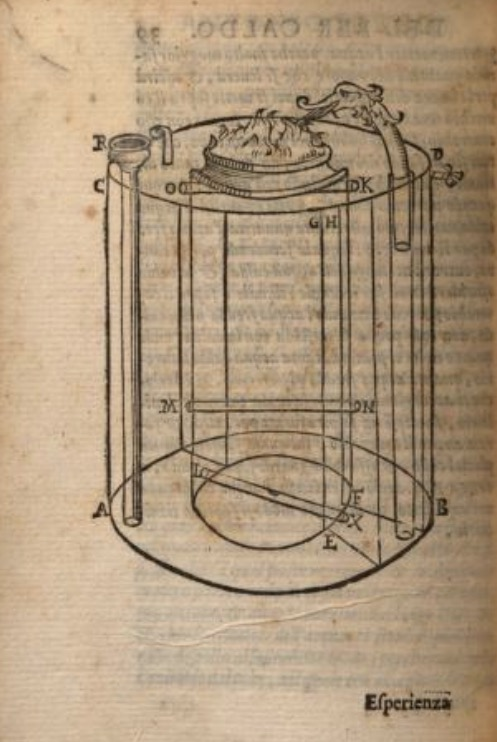
Diagram from Antonio Persio's 'Del bever caldo'

Antonio Persio (17 May 1542 – 11 February 1612) was an Italian philosopher of the Platonic school who opposed the Aristotelianism which predominated in the universities of his time. He was a member of the Accademia dei Lincei and an associate of Galileo Galilei.

== Life ==
Antonio Persio was born at Matera, the oldest of five sons of the sculptor Altobello Persio. As a child he suffered from a serious illness which caused a temporary paralysis of all his limbs. His maternal uncle the humanist Leonardo Goffredo was in charge of the boys' education in Matera, and with the exception of the second son Giovanni Battista, all were later prominent in their chosen field - Antonio in philosophy, Giulio as a sculptor, Domizio in holy orders and in painting, and Ascanio in the humanities and philology.

After taking minor orders, Antonio moved to Naples in 1560 where he became a presbyter and was appointed as tutor to Lelio and Pietro Orsini, younger brothers of Ferdinando Orsini, Duke of Gravina and Count of Matera. He met Bernardino Telesio whose follower he became, and wrote a number of works defending and expounding on the views of his master. After Telesio's death he arranged for the publication of a number of his writings under the title Varii de rebus naturalibus libelli.

At the end of 1570, after a short stay in Rome, he moved to Perugia, as the tutor of the Orsini brothers, who wanted to study civil and canon law. There he developed links with the Caetani brothers; Camillo Caetani introduced him to Paolo Manuzio and Manuzio's son Aldo. In 1572 he moved to the Republic of Venice and entered the service of the patrician Giorgio Correr as tutor to his son Andrea. At the same time he published an important commentary on the Pandects in 1575. In 1576 became a parish priest in Padua, where he published Trattato dell'ingegno dell'huomo, (Note: Digital version of Trattato dell'ingegno dell'huomo) in which he developed Telesio's theories about the spiritus, inspiration, movement, life and intelligence.

In 1590 he moved to Rome, where he met Tommaso Campanella and Galileo Galilei. Here he published a medical tract, Del bever caldo, (Note: Digital version of Del Bever Caldo) in which he pursued a number of ideas discussed in his previous work about the spirit, with advice on how to preserve it.

Persio died in Rome on 22 January 1612 in the Palazzo Cesi-Armellini and was buried in the church of Sant'Onofrio. He was admitted posthumously to the Accademia dei Lincei.

== Works ==
- Digestum vetus seu Pandectarum iuris civilis: commentarijs Accursii ... praecipue autem Antonii Persii philosophiae, ... illustratus, Venezia, Francesco De Franceschi, Gaspare Bindoni, Nicolò Bevilacqua, Damiano Zenaro, 1574.
- Liber nouarum positionum, in Rhetoricis Dialecticis Ethicis Iure ciuili Iure pontificio Physicis, Venezia, Iacopo Simbeni, 1575.
- Trattato dell'ingegno dell'huomo, Venezia, Aldo Manuzio, 1576.
- Digestum vetus, seu Pandectarum iuris civilis tomus primus: cum pandectis florentini, Venezia, De Franceschi, Francesco; Bindoni, Gaspare, il vecchio; Bevilacqua, Niccolò; Zenaro, Damiano, 1575.
- Disputationes libri novarum positionum Antonii Persii, triduo habitae Venetiis anno MDLXXV, mense maio. Edidit Andreas Alethinus, Firenze, Marescotti, 1576.
- B. Telesio, Varii de naturalibus rebus libelli ab Antonio Persio editi, Venezia, Felice Valgrisio, 1590.
- Del bever caldo, costumato da gli antichi Romani, Venezia, Ciotti, 1593.
