= Locri Cathedral =

Roman Catholic cathedral in Calabria, Italy

Coordinates: 38°14′12″N 16°15′40″E

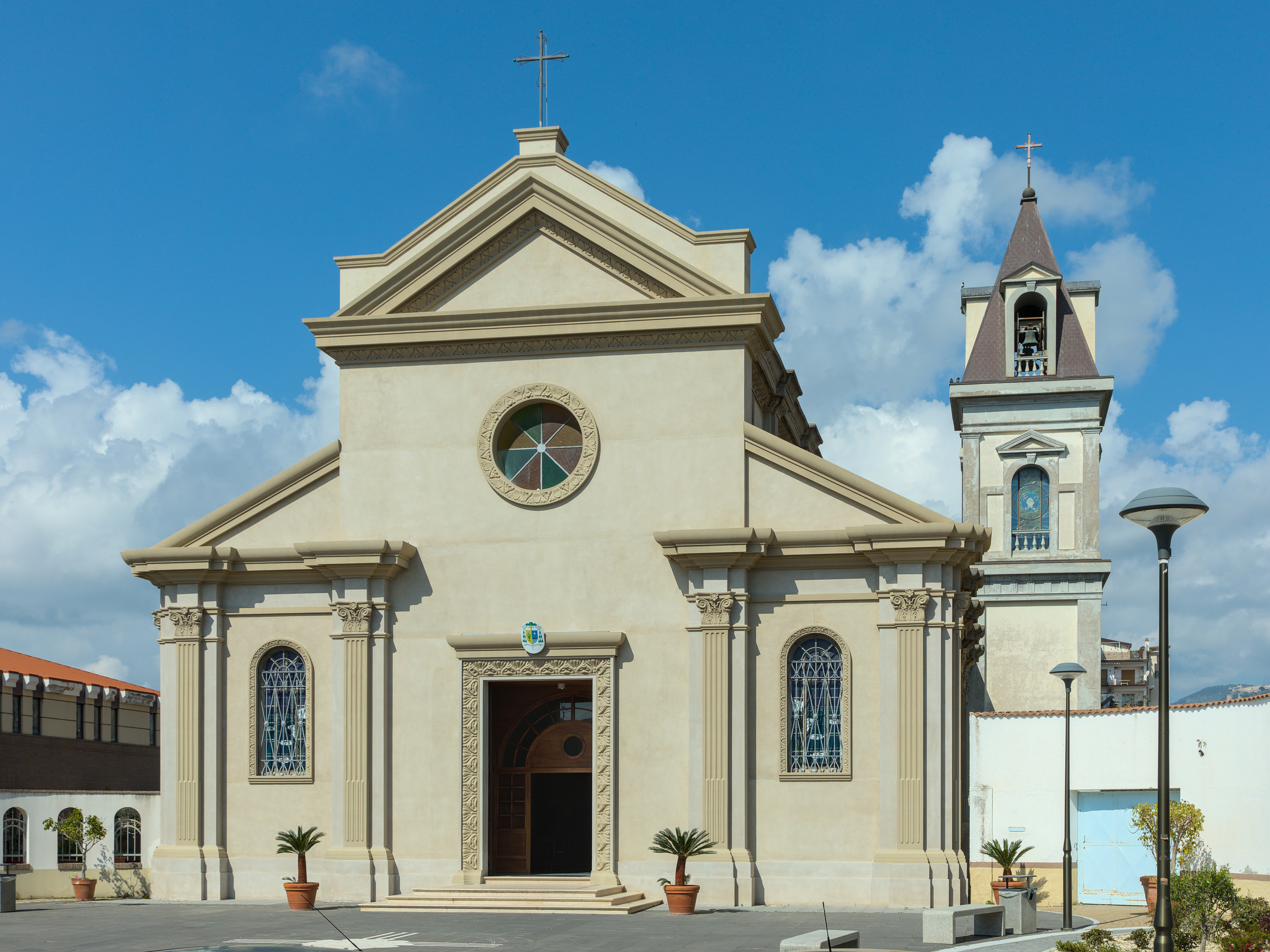
The façade and church tower

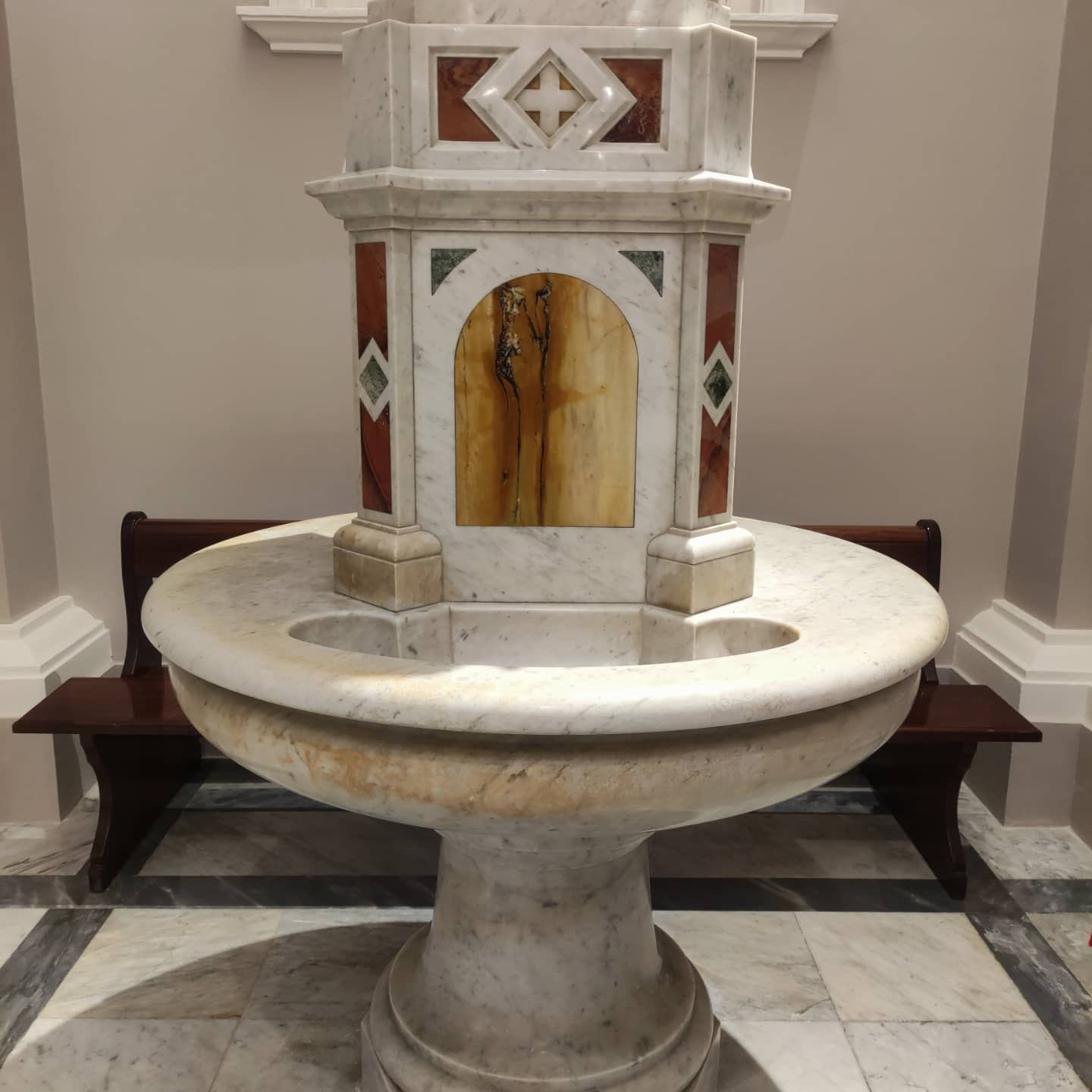
Baptismal font

Locri Cathedral (Italian: Cattedrale di Santa Maria del Mastro; Duomo di Locri) is a Roman Catholic cathedral dedicated to the Virgin Mary in the city of Locri, in Calabria, Italy. Since 1954 it has been the seat of the bishops of Gerace-Locri, now the bishops of Locri-Gerace.

The church building, in the Lombard Romanesque style, was built in 1933 by order of Mgr. Giorgio Delrio, bishop of Gerace (1906–1920).

The interior, on a Latin cross groundplan, has three aisles: the two side aisles terminate in small chapels. The central part of the north aisle contains a marble sculpture depicting Bishop Francesco Saverio Mangeruva (1872-1905) and the sarcophagus of Bishop Michele Alberto Arduino (1962–1972).

== See also ==
- Catholic Church in Italy
