= Lesina Cathedral =

Italian Roman Catholic Church in Lesina, Apulia

Lesina Cathedral (Italian: Cattedrale della Santissima Annunziata) is a Roman Catholic church and former cathedral dedicated to the Annunciation of the Virgin Mary located in Lesina, in the region of Apulia, Italy.

There was a church on this site from c. 600 which served as the cathedral of the former Diocese of Lesina until it was suppressed in favour of the Diocese of Larino in 1567. Rebuilt over the centuries, the building was destroyed by an earthquake in 1630. By the 1650s, another church had been built, dedicated to the Annunciation and consecrated in 1691, which was replaced in its turn in 1828–1837. In 1922 the roof fell in, and was not rebuilt until the 1950s.

The church has a single nave with two side chapels. The interior has frescoes depicting the Life of Christ by Bocchetti Gaetano.
