= Lagonegro =

Town in the province of Potenza

- Comune
- Comune di Lagonegro
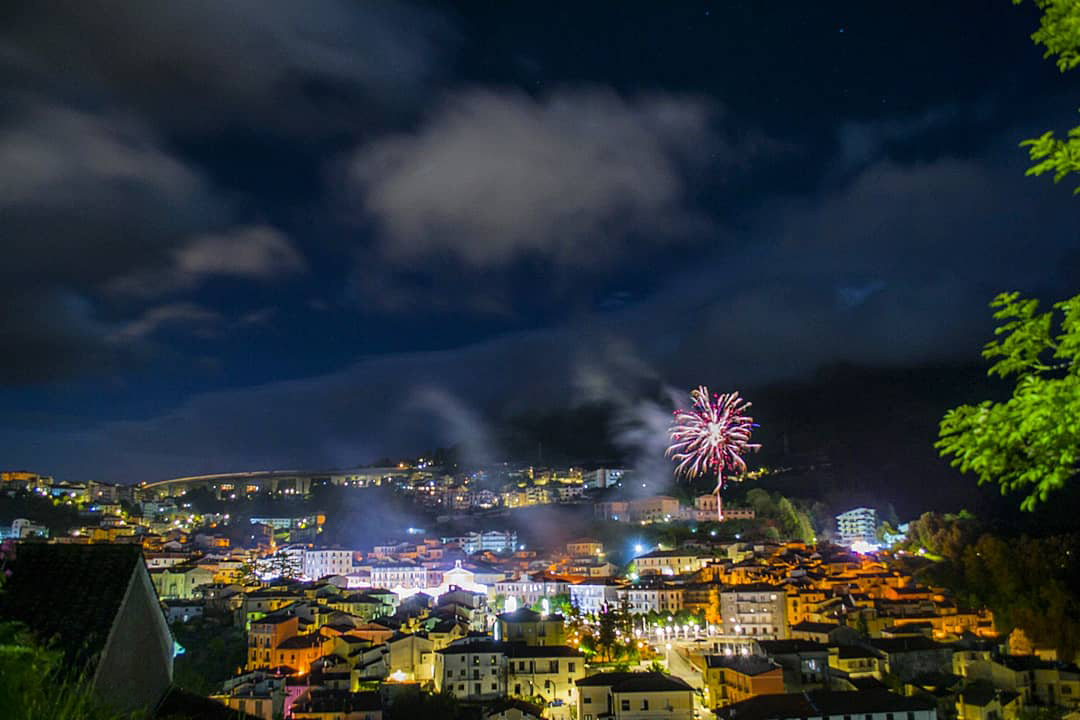
- View of Lagonegro

- Coat of arms

- Lagonegro within the Province of Potenza

- Location of Lagonegro in Italy Lagonegro (Basilicata)
- Coordinates: 40°8′N 15°46′E
- Country: Italy
- Region: Basilicata
- Province: Potenza (PZ)
- Frazioni: Casale Serino, Cervaro, Farno, Fecìla, Fortino, Malpignata, Pennarone, Strette

Government
  - Mayor: Maria Rita Cocciufa (commissar§)

Area
  - Total: 113.07 km^{2} (43.66 sq mi)
- Elevation: 666 m (2,185 ft)

Population (31 December 2017)
  - Total: 5,442
  - Density: 48.13/km^{2} (124.7/sq mi)
- Demonym: Lagonegresi
- Time zone: UTC+1 (CET)
  - Summer (DST): UTC+2 (CEST)
- Postal code: 85042
- Dialing code: 0973
- ISTAT code: 076039
- Patron saint: St. Nicholas of Bari
- Saint day: 6 December
- Website: Official website

Lagonegro (Lucano: Launìvere) is a town and comune in the province of Potenza, in the Southern Italy region of Basilicata. It is part of the Valle del Noce and has (2017) a population of 5,471.

== Geography ==
The municipality, located southwest of its province, near the borders of Basilicata with Cilento, a subregion of Campania, is bordered by the municipalities of Casalbuono, Casaletto Spartano, Lauria, Moliterno, Montesano sulla Marcellana, Nemoli, Rivello and Tortorella. It counts the hamlets (frazioni) of Casale Serino, Cervaro, Farno, Fecìla, Fortino, Malpignata, Pennarone and Strette.

== Transport ==
The town is served by two exits ("Lagonegro Nord" and "Lagonegro Sud") of the A2 motorway, linking Naples and Salerno to Cosenza, Lamezia and Reggio Calabria. Its railway station is the terminus of 2 abandoned lines using two different gauges: the standard gauge line Sicignano–Lagonegro, and the narrow gauge line Lagonegro–Castrovillari–Spezzano Albanese.

== People ==
- Tiziana Alagia (born 1973), long-distance runner
- Giuseppe Mango (1954–2014), singer
- Angelina Mango (born 2001), singer and Sanremo Festival winner

== See also ==
- Lagonegro Cathedral
