= Lesina, Apulia =

Lesina
- Comune
- Comune di Lesina
- Coat of arms

- Location within Italy Location within Apulia
- Coordinates: 41°51′45″N 15°21′10″E
- Country: Italy
- Region: Apulia
- Province: Foggia (FG)
- Frazioni: Ripalta

Government
  - Mayor: Pasquale Tucci

Area
  - Total: 159 km^{2} (61 sq mi)

Population (28 February 2017)
  - Total: 6,346
  - Density: 39.9/km^{2} (103/sq mi)
- Demonym: Lesinesi
- Time zone: UTC+1 (CET)
  - Summer (DST): UTC+2 (CEST)
- Postal code: 71010
- Dialing code: 0882
- Patron saint: St. Primianus, St. Roch, Annunciation of Mary
- Saint day: May 15
- Website: Official website

Lesina (Italian pronunciation: [ˈleːzina, ˈlɛːzina]) is a town and comune, former bishopric and Latin Catholic titular see on the northern side of Monte Gargano in the province of Foggia, in the Apulia region of southeast Italy.

== Geography ==
Lake Lesina and town

Lesina lies on the northern side of Gargano and on the shores of the lake with the same name. It is a maritime village known for the production of (female) eels. The site, populated since the Neolithic era, is on the south side of the lake, with a narrow strip of land covered with sandy dunes and little woods separating the lake from the sea, which creeps into its waters through two canals (Aquarotta and Schiapparo).

Devio hill, only 252 metres (827 ft) high, divides the two lakes, Lesina and Varano, and some findings of the Neolithic era have been found there. Lesina, built after the immigration of Dalmatian fishers, and known to Romans as Alexina, was often afflicted by earthquakes and sea flooding, and its population was decimated by malaria.

The hot waters of Caldoli stream, not very far and near San Nazario Sanctuary, testify to its volcanic activities. The first patron saint of the town is San Primiano Martire, celebrated on 15 May.

== Diocese of Lesina ==
Lesina became a bishopric in the thirteenth century until it was suppressed into the diocese of Larino around the year 1567. It was restored as a titular see in 1968.

== Main sights ==
- Lesina Cathedral
- Episcopal Palace (13th century)
- Natural Museum of the Lake Lesina
