= Marco Copula =

Most Reverend Marco Copula
- Bishop of Montepeloso
- Church: Catholic Church
- Diocese: Diocese of Montepeloso
- In office: 1498–1527
- Predecessor: Leonardo Carmini
- Successor: Agostino Landolfi

Personal details
- Died: 1527 Montepeloso, Italy

Bishop Marco Copula, O.S.B. (Latin: Marcus Copula) (died 1527) was a Roman Catholic prelate who served as Bishop of Montepeloso (1498–1527).

== Biography ==
Marco Copula was ordained a priest in the Order of Saint Benedict. On 26 November 1498, he was appointed during the papacy of Pope Alexander VI as Bishop of Montepeloso. He served as Bishop of Montepeloso until his death in 1527.

== External links and additional sources ==
- Cheney, David M. "Diocese of Montepeloso". Catholic-Hierarchy.org. (Chronology of Bishops) ^{[self-published]}
- Chow, Gabriel. "Diocese of Irsina (Italy)". GCatholic.org. (Chronology of Bishops) ^{[self-published]}

Catholic Church titles
Preceded by Leonardo Carmini	Bishop of Montepeloso; 1498–1527	Succeeded by Agostino Landolfi
