= Irsina Cathedral =

Roman Catholic Cathedral in Irsina, Italy

Coordinates: 40°44′30″N 16°14′37″E

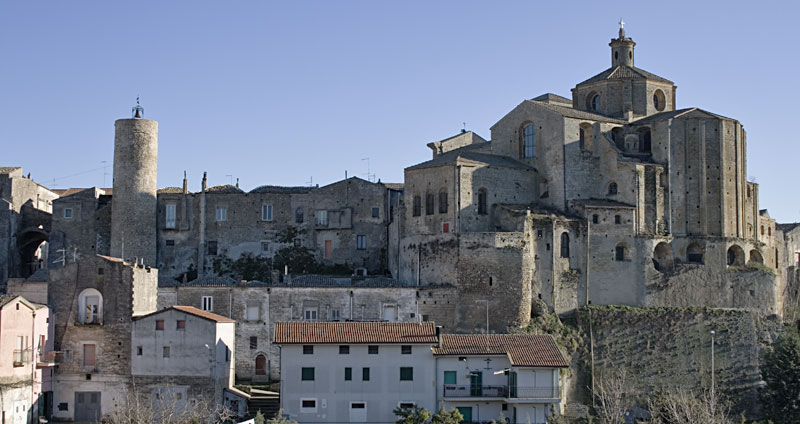
Irsina Cathedral

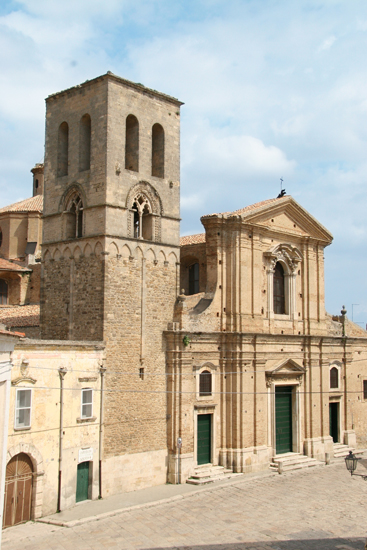
Façade

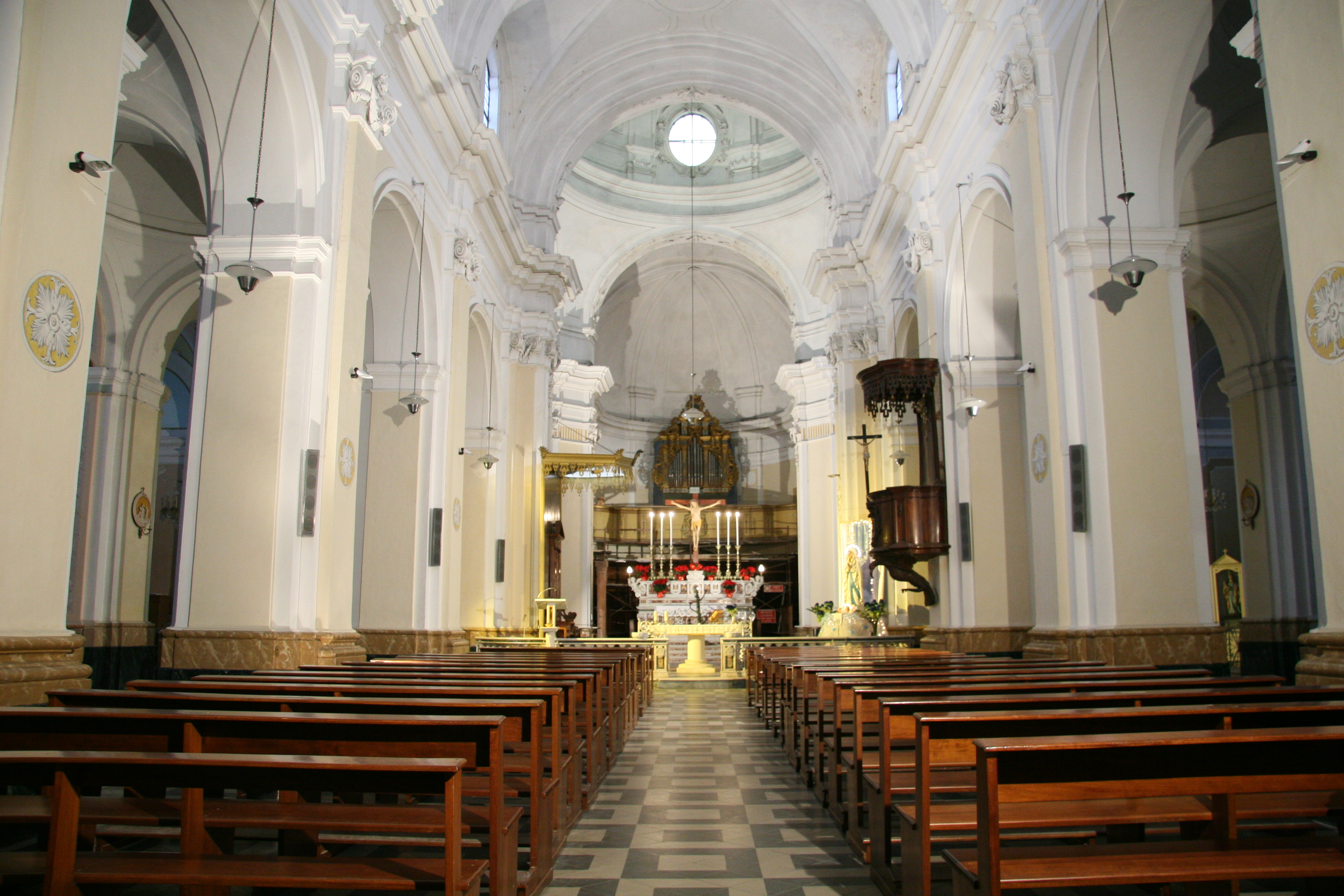
Inside Cathedral

Irsina Cathedral (Italian: Cattedrale di Santa Maria Assunta, Duomo di Irsina), formerly Montepeloso Cathedral, is a Roman Catholic cathedral dedicated to the Assumption of the Blessed Virgin Mary, located in Irsina in the region of Basilicata, Italy. Since 1977 it has been a co-cathedral of the Archdiocese of Matera-Irsina, and was previously, from 1818, a co-cathedral of the Diocese of Gravina-Irsina. Before that it was the seat of the Diocese of Montepeloso. The present building was constructed in the 13th century and remodelled in 1777. It has a Baroque façade and a Gothic campanile. It contains a baptismal font of red marble and a number of 18th-century paintings of the Neapolitan School.

The cathedral also contains a well-known marble statue of Saint Euphemia. This has been attributed by some critics to Mantegna, and was exhibited as his at Mantua in 2009. Others however, including Giovanni Agosti, curator of the Mantegna exhibition at the Louvre, attribute it to Pietro Lombardo. The discussion continues.

The festival of Saint Euphemia, patron of Irsina, takes place on 14–17 September. On 16 September the keys of the city are offered to the archbishop on the altar of the cathedral, and by him to Saint Euphemia. A long procession then takes place through the streets of the town carrying the statue of the saint, the reliquary containing her arm and the icon of Our Lady of Divine Providence.

== Sources ==
- Catholic Hierarchy: Archdiocese of Matera-Irsina
- Comune di Irsina official website: Cattedrale (in Italian)
