= Agostino Landolfi =

Most Reverend Agostino Landolfi
- Bishop of Montepeloso
- Church: Catholic Church
- Diocese: Diocese of Montepeloso
- In office: 1528–1532
- Predecessor: Marco Copula
- Successor: Giovanni Domenico de Cupis

Personal details
- Died: 1532 Montepeloso, Italy

Agostino Landolfi, O.S.A. (Latin: Augustinus Landulfus) (died 1532) was a Roman Catholic prelate who served as Bishop of Montepeloso (1528–1532).

== Biography ==
Agostino Landolfi was ordained a priest in the Order of Saint Augustine. On 23 March 1528, he was appointed during the papacy of Pope Clement VII as Bishop of Montepeloso. He served as Bishop of Montepeloso until his death in 1532.

== External links and additional sources ==
- Cheney, David M. "Diocese of Montepeloso". Catholic-Hierarchy.org. (Chronology of Bishops) ^{[self-published]}
- Chow, Gabriel. "Diocese of Irsina (Italy)". GCatholic.org. (Chronology of Bishops) ^{[self-published]}

Catholic Church titles
Preceded by Marco Copula	Bishop of Montepeloso; 1528–1532	Succeeded by Giovanni Domenico de Cupis
