= Diocese of Montepeloso =

Former Roman Catholic Diocese

The Diocese of Montepeloso (also Diocese of Irsina) (Latin: Dioecesis Montis Pelusii) was a Roman Catholic diocese located in the town of Montepeloso in the province of Matera in the Southern Italian region of Basilicata. It was united with the Diocese of Gravina (di Puglia) to form the Diocese of Gravina e Irsina (Montepeloso) in 1818. The name "Irsina" was given to the town of Montepeloso by vote of the council of the commune on 6 February 1895.

== History ==
The town of Montepeloso had been fortified by the Byzantines as a north-west outpost against the Lombards. There is no notice of its existence before 988.

In the privilege granted by the Patriarch of Constantinople to the Metropolitan of Otranto in the 960s, the Metropolitan was granted the right to consecrate the bishops of Acerenza, Tursi, Gravina, Matera, and Tricarico. Montepeloso, though it was a frontier town in Byzantine territory like these bishoprics, is not mentioned in the privilege. The Diocese of Montepeloso, nevertheless, is said to have been established by the Byzantines in the late 10th or early 11th century. In 1011, the Byzantine garrison of Montepeloso was attacked by Saracen raiders, under the leadership of Ismael.

In 1041, a revolt of the Lombards against the Byzantines was restarted by Ardoin, who recruited several hundred Norman knights and footsoldiers from Salerno under the leadership of William "Ironarm" Hauteville. A definitive clash took place in a day-long pitched battle at Montepeloso in September 1041, after the Normans had stolen all their cattle and cut their supply line to the coast. The Lombard and Norman victory resulted in the expulsion of the Byzantines from Montepeloso and from the hill country, and the capture of their newly appointed katapan Bojoannes, who had to be ransomed. In 1042, the Norman Tancred became the Count of Montepeloso.

In 1059, an unnamed bishop of Montepelosi was deposed, by order of Pope Nicholas II at the Council of Melfi.

=== Restoration, directly dependent on Holy See ===
On 11 September 1123, Pope Calixtus II wrote from Benevento to Bishop Leo of Montepeloso, remarking that the diocese of Montepeloso had been appropriated by the archdiocese of Acerenzo without papal sanction, and handed it over to the diocese of Tricarico. The pope had been approached, when he visited Montepeloso and again at his palace in Benevento, by the bishop-elect Leo and the people of Montepeloso, begging to be granted their own bishop. After wide consultation, he restored the Diocese of Montepeloso and consecrated Leo. Leo had been Prior of the Benedictine monastery of S. Maria in Montepeloso. The diocese of Montepeloso was made directly dependent upon the Holy See.

=== Destruction ===
In 1133, King Roger II of Sicily completely destroyed the town of Montepeloso, which was a center of resistance to his rule. All the inhabitants left in the town, including the women and children, were slaughtered. The entire county fell under the control of the county of Andria and the Diocese of Andria Another revolt broke out in the spring of 1555, after William I came to the throne and appeared to be weak. The Byzantine emperor Manuel I Komnenos sent aid, and his agents Michael Paleologus and John Doukas raised a rebellion in Apulia. Bari, Trani, Giovinazzo, Ruvo, Andria, Montepeloso, Gravina, and numerous other towns and villages submitted to the Greeks. In William's counterstrike in 1156, climaxing in the battle of 28 May 1156, the Byzantine forces were overwhelmed.

Pope Celestine III (1191–1198) was repeatedly petitioned by the clergy of Montepeloso to restore the bishopric of Montepeloso, which they had long had (quam habuerunt antiquitus). He ordered the petitioners to drop the subject, permanently.

In 1195, the abbess of the church of S. Thomas at Barletta complained to the pope that the Prior of Montepeloso and the vicar of Barletta had broken into the church with an armed force, and attempted to strangle the abbess. On 15 December 1195, Pope Celestine III ordered that the perpetrators be excommunicated.

=== Restoration, and independence ===
In 1460, the Diocese of Montepeloso was united, aeque personaliter, to the Diocese of Andria, though not by papal action or with papal approval. Its bishops were actually the bishops of Andria.

In 1479, the clergy and people of the diocese of Montepeloso, repeatedly given short shrift by the Duke and Bishop of Andria, sent a petition to Pope Sixtus IV carried by their Archdeacon, Antonio Maffei. The pope was impressed by the simple honesty of the archdeacon, and the justice of the complaints he brought in his petition. On 25 June 1479, Pope Sixtus issued the bull "Romanus Pontifex", in which he pronounced the union of the dioceses of Andria and Montepeloso null and void, returning the diocese of Montepeloso and the Priory of S. Maria to the status quo ante. Antonio Maffei was appointed bishop of Montepeloso.

Pope Sixtus IV made the diocese of Montepelosi directly dependent upon the Holy See.

=== Reorganization ===
Following the expulsion of the French occupying forces in 1816, and the restoration of the Papal States and the Kingdom of Naples, a new concordat was signed on 16 February 1818, and ratified by Pius VII on 25 February 1818. Ferdinand I of the Two Sicilies issued the concordat as a law on 21 March 1818. The re-erection of the dioceses of the kingdom and the ecclesiastical provinces took more than three years. The right of the king to nominate the candidate for a vacant bishopric was recognized, as in the Concordat of 1741, subject to papal confirmation (preconisation). On 27 June 1818, Pius VII issued the bull De Ulteriore, in which he joined the diocese of Gravina to the diocese of Montepeluso in perpetual union, as the Diocese of Gravina e Montepeloso, one bishop to preside over both dioceses. Montepelosi was the dominant partner.

=== Diocesan restructuring of 1986 ===
The Second Vatican Council (1962–1965), in order to ensure that all Catholics received proper spiritual attention, decreed the reorganization of the diocesan structure of Italy and the consolidation of small and struggling dioceses. It also recommended the abolition of anomalous units such as exempt territorial prelatures.

On 11 October 1976, the Roman Catholic Diocese of Gravina-Montepeloso was dismembered. Montepeloso was moved, to join the diocese of Matera, as the Diocese of Matera e Irsina (Montepeloso), two dioceses united in having one and the same bishop. The diocese of Gravina became a suffragan of the archdiocese of Bari-Bitonto.

On 18 February 1984, the Vatican and the Italian State signed a new and revised concordat. Based on the revisions, a set of Normae was issued on 15 November 1984, which was accompanied in the next year, on 3 June 1985, by enabling legislation. According to the agreement, the practice of having one bishop govern two separate dioceses at the same time, aeque personaliter, as was the case with Montepeloso and Gravina, was to be abolished. Instead, the Vatican continued consultations which had begun under Pope John XXIII for the merging of small dioceses, especially those with personnel and financial problems, into one combined diocese.

On 30 September 1986, Pope John Paul II ordered that the diocese of Gravina be suppressed, and that its territory be incorporated along with the Prelature of Altamura and the Prelature of Aquaviva into a new diocese, the "Dioecesis Altamurensis-Gravinensis-Aquavivensis." At the same time, the diocese of Montepeloso (Irpina) was suppressed, and its territory became part of the "Archidioecesis Materanensis-Montis Pelusii".

== Bishops of Montepeloso ==
Antonellus, O.S.F. (1452–1463)

- Antonius de Joannocto, O.P. (1460–1463)
- Rogerius da Atella (1463–1465) Bishop of Andria
- Franciscus Bertini (1465–1469) Bishop of Andria
- Martinus Sotomajor (1469–1477) Bishop of Andria
- Donatus, Bishop of Andria
- Antonio Maffei (1479–1482 Died)
- Julius Caesar Cantelmi (1482–1491 Resigned)
- Leonardo Carmini (1491–1498)
- Marco Copula, O.S.B. (1498–1527)
- Agostino Landolfi, O.S.A. (1528–1532 Resigned)

Giovanni Domenico de Cupis (1532–1537 Resigned) Administrator

- Bernardino Tempestino (1537–1540)
- Martino Santacroce (1540–1546)
- Paolo de Cupis (1546–1548)
- Ascanio Ferrari (1548–1550 Resigned)
- Vincenzo Ferrari (1550–1561)
- Giovanni Ludovico da Campania (1561–1566)
- Vincenzo Ferrari (1564–1578)
- Lucio Maranta (1578–1592 Died)
- Gioia Dragomani (1592–1596 Resigned)
- Camillo de Scribani (1596–1600)
- Hippolytus Manari, O.S.M. (1600–1604)
- Francesco Persico (1605–1615 Died)
- Tommaso Sanfelice, C.R. (1615–1620)
- Honorius Griffagni, O.S.B. (1621–1623)
- Diego Merino, O. Carm. (1623–1626)
- Theodorus Pelleoni, O.F.M. Conv. (1627–1636)
- Gaudius Castelli (1637)
- Attilio Orsini (1638–1655?)
- Filippo Cesarini (1655–1674)
- Raffaele Riario Di Saono, O.S.B. (1674–1683 Died)

Raffaele Parrillo (1683)

- Fabrizio Susanna (1684–1705)
- Antonio Aiello (1706–1714)
- Domenico Potenza (1718–1739)
- Cesare Rossi (1739–1750)
- Bartolomeo Coccoli (1750–1761)
- Francesco Paolo Carelli (1761–1763)
- Tommaso Agostino de Simone (1763–1781)
- Francesco Saverio Saggese (1792–1794)
- Archangelo Lupoli (1797–1818)

27 June 1818: United with the Diocese of Gravina (di Puglia) to form the Diocese of Gravina e Montepeloso

== See also ==
- Roman Catholic Diocese of Gravina-Montepeloso
- Roman Catholic Archdiocese of Matera-Irsina
- Catholic Church in Italy
- List of Catholic dioceses in Italy

== Books ==
- Eubel, Conradus (1890), "Die Bischöfe, Cardinale und Päpste aus dem Minoritenorden," (in German), in: Römische Quartalschrift für Christliche Altertumskunde 4 (1890), pp. 185–258.
- Eubel, Conradus, ed. (1913). Hierarchia catholica (in Latin). Vol. Tomus 1 (second ed.). Münster: Libreria Regensbergiana.
- Eubel, Conradus, ed. (1914). Hierarchia catholica (in Latin). Vol. Tomus 2 (second ed.). Münster: Libreria Regensbergiana.
- Eubel, Conradus; Gulik, Guilelmus (1923). Hierarchia catholica (in Latin). Vol. 3 (second ed.). Münster: Libreria Regensbergiana.
- Gams, Pius Bonifatius (1873). Series episcoporum Ecclesiae catholicae: quotquot innotuerunt a beato Petro apostolo (in Latin). Ratisbon: Typis et Sumptibus Georgii Josephi Manz. pp. 908–909.
- Gauchat, Patritius (Patrice) (1935). Hierarchia catholica (in Latin). Vol. IV (1592-1667). Münster: Libraria Regensbergiana.
- Ritzler, Remigius; Sefrin, Pirminus (1952). Hierarchia catholica medii et recentis aevi (in Latin). Vol. V (1667-1730). Patavii: Messagero di S. Antonio.
- Ritzler, Remigius; Sefrin, Pirminus (1958). Hierarchia catholica medii et recentis aevi (in Latin). Vol. VI (1730-1799). Patavii: Messagero di S. Antonio.
- Ritzler, Remigius; Sefrin, Pirminus (1968). Hierarchia Catholica medii et recentioris aevi (in Latin). Vol. VII (1800–1846). Monasterii: Libr. Regensburgiana.

=== Studies ===
- Cappelletti, Giuseppe (1870). Le chiese d'Italia dalla loro origine sino ai nostri giorni (in Italian). Vol. vigesimoprimo (21). Venezia: Antonelli. pp. 371–375.
- D'Avino, Vincenzio (1848). Cenni storici sulle chiese arcivescovili, vescovili, e prelatizie (nullius) del regno delle due Sicilie (in Italian). Naples: dalle stampe di Ranucci. pp. 408–411.
- Duchesne, Louis (1903). "L'eveché de Montepeloso," (in French), in: Mélanges d'archéologie et d'histoire XXIII (1903), pp. 363–373.
- Ianora (Janora), Michele (1901). Memorie storiche, critiche e diplomatiche della città di Montepeloso (oggi Irsina). (in Italian). Matera: Tip. F. Conti, 1901.
- Kehr, Paul Fridolin (1962). Italia pontificia. Vol. IX: Samnium — Apulia — Lucania. Berlin: Weidmann. (in Latin) pp. 476–480.
- Ughelli, Ferdinando; Coleti, Niccolò (1717). Italia sacra, sive De Episcopis Italiae (in Latin). Vol. Tomus primus (secunda ed.). Venice: apud Sebastianum Coleti. pp. 998–1002.
