= Antonio Maffei =

Most Reverend Antonio Maffei
- Bishop of Montepeloso
- Church: Catholic Church
- Diocese: Diocese of Montepeloso
- In office: 1479–1482
- Successor: Julius Caesar Cantelmi

Personal details
- Died: 1482 Montepeloso, Italy

Antonio Maffei or Antonius de Maffeis (died 1482) was a Roman Catholic prelate who served as Bishop of Montepeloso from 1479 until his death.

On 25 June 1479, Antonio Maffei was appointed Bishop of Montepeloso during the papacy of Pope Sixtus IV. He held that position until his death in 1482.

== External links and additional sources ==
- Cheney, David M. "Diocese of Montepeloso". Catholic-Hierarchy.org. (Chronology of Bishops) ^{[self-published]}
- Chow, Gabriel. "Diocese of Irsina (Italy)". GCatholic.org. (Chronology of Bishops) ^{[self-published]}

Catholic Church titles
Preceded by	Bishop of Montepeloso; 1479–1482	Succeeded by Julius Caesar Cantelmi
