= Raffaele Calabro =

Italian Roman Catholic bishop

- Bishop of Andria
- Church: Catholic Church
- Diocese: Diocese of Andria
- In office: 19 November 1988 – 29 January 2016
- Predecessor: Giuseppe Lanave
- Successor: Luigi Mansi

Orders
- Ordination: 15 March 1964 by Gaetano Pollio
- Consecration: 6 January 1989 by Pope John Paul II

Personal details
- Born: 10 July 1940 Minervino di Lecce, Province of Lecce, Kingdom of Italy
- Died: 4 August 2017 (aged 77) Andria, Apulia, Italy

Raffaele Calabro (10 July 1940 – 4 August 2017) was a Roman Catholic bishop.

Ordained to the priesthood in 1964, Calabro served as bishop of the Roman Catholic Diocese of Andria, Italy, from 1989 to 2016.
