= Archdiocese of Matera-Irsina =

Catholic archdiocese in Italy

Coordinates: 40.6667°N 16.6000°E

Archdiocese of Matera-Irsina Archidioecesis Materanensis-Montis Pelusii

Catholic
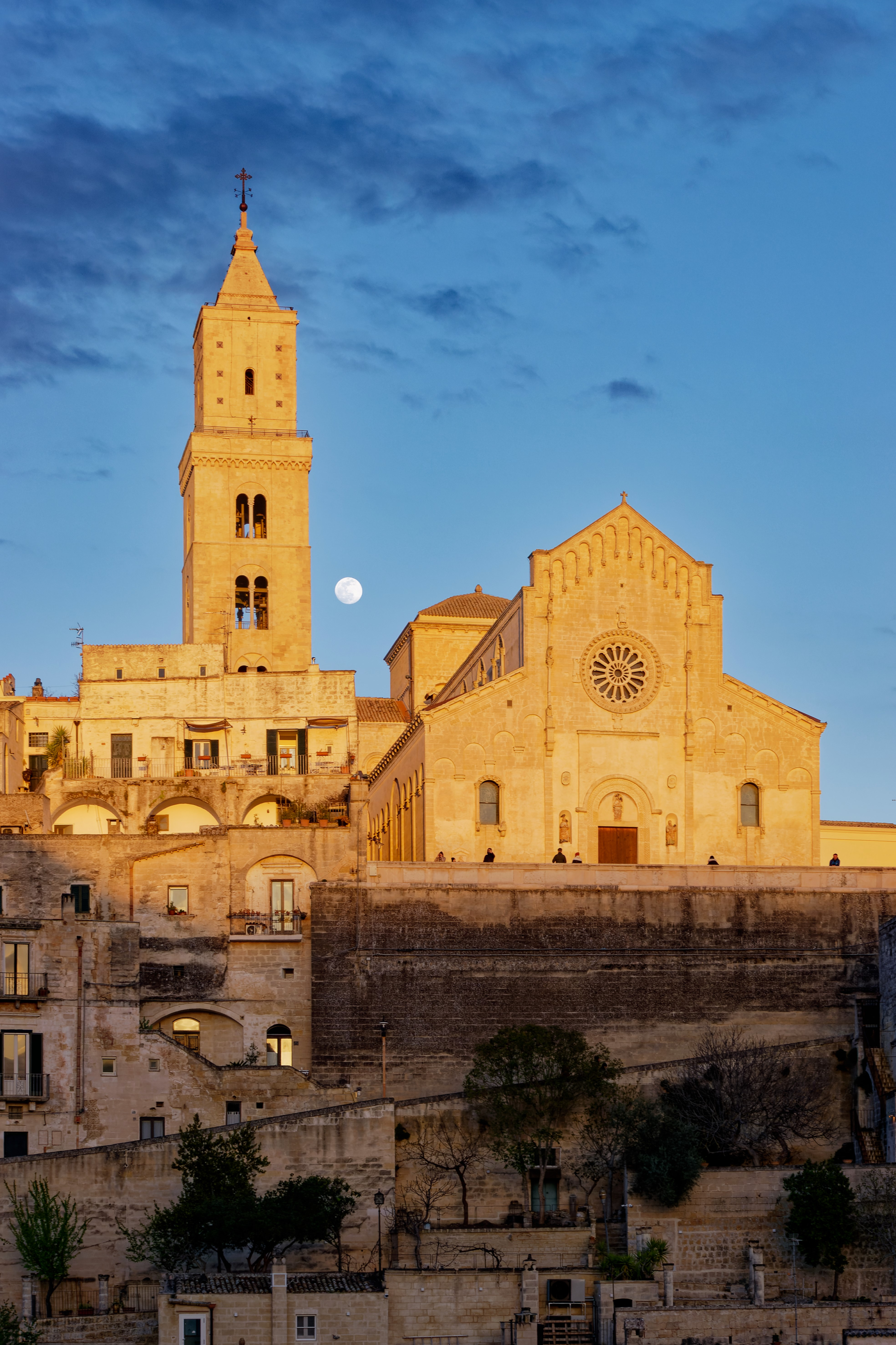
- Matera Cathedral

Location
- Country: Italy
- Ecclesiastical province: Potenza-Muro Lucano-Marsico Nuovo

Statistics
- Area: 2,020 km^{2} (780 sq mi)
- Population: Total; Catholics: (as of 2023); 146,000 (est.) ▼; 126,000 (est.) ▼
- Parishes: 55 ▼

Information
- Denomination: Catholic Church
- Rite: Roman Rite
- Established: 2 July 1954 (72 years ago)
- Cathedral: Basilica Cattedrale di S. Maria Assunta della Bruna (Matera)
- Co-cathedral: Concattedrale di S. Maria Assunta (Irsina)
- Secular priests: 68 (diocesan); 23 (religious orders); 4 Permanent Deacons

Current leadership
- Pope: Leo XIV
- Archbishop: Benoni Ambăruș

Map
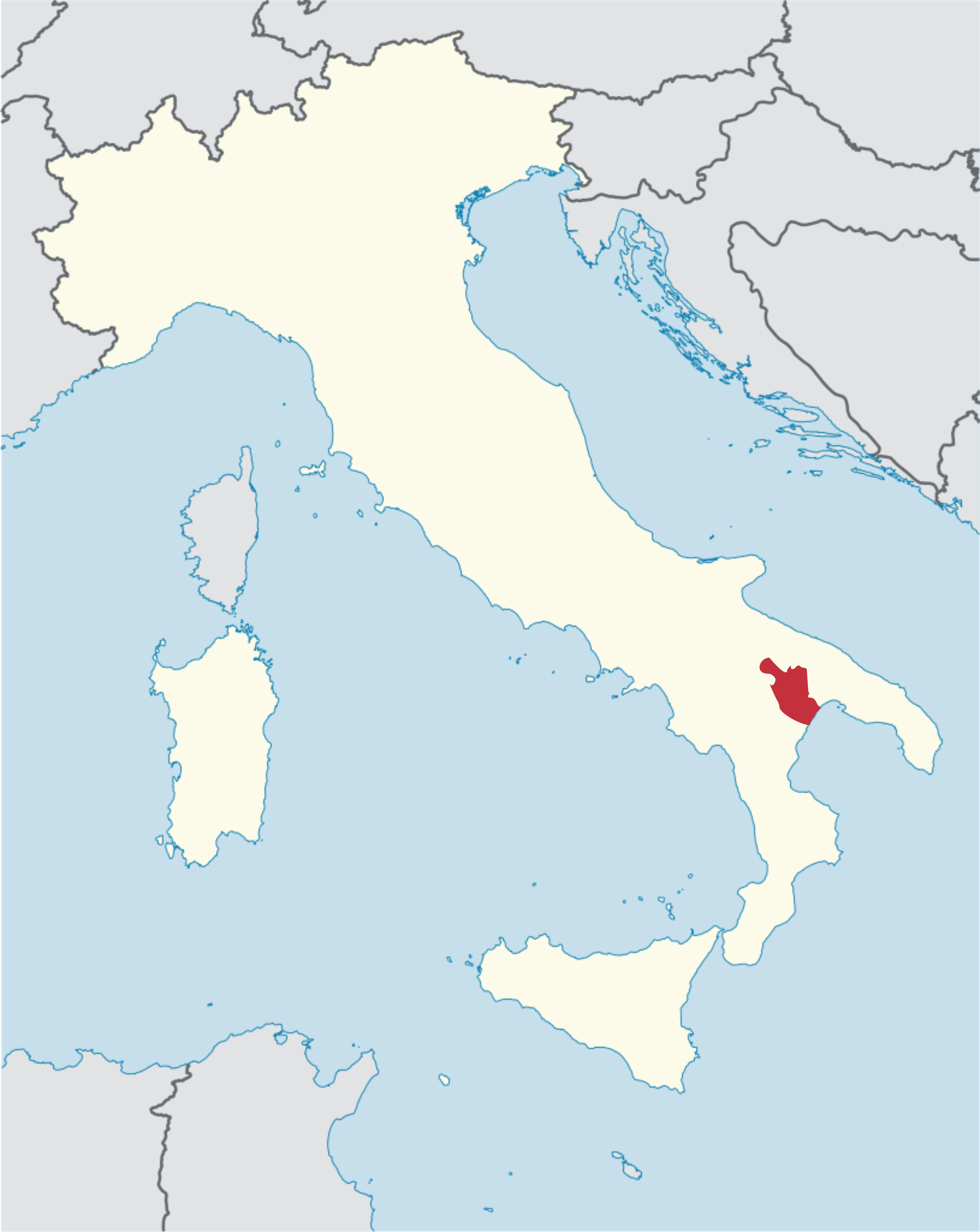

Website
- Arcidiocesi di Matera-Irsini (in Italian)

The Archdiocese of Matera-Irsina (Latin: Archidioecesis Materanensis-Montis Pelusii) is a Latin archdiocese of the Catholic Church in Basilicata, Italy. It has existed under this name since 1986. The archbishop is seated at Matera Cathedral. (Irsina Cathedral is a co-cathedral). It is a suffragan of the Archdiocese of Potenza-Muro Lucano-Marsico Nuovo.

On Monday, October 5, 2015, Archbishop Salvatore Ligorio was elevated by Pope Francis to be Metropolitan Archbishop of the Roman Catholic Archdiocese of Potenza-Muro Lucano-Marsico Nuovo (in Potenza, Italy), to whose province the Archdiocese of Matera-Irsina (in Matera, Italy, and Irsina, Italy) belongs. It is not the norm, but by no means irregular to have a non-metropolitan archdiocese under a metropolitan archdiocese.

== History ==
The Diocese of Matera was originally a separate diocese. Its origins are not well documented. Giuseppe Cappelletti collected a list of five alleged bishops of Matera between 484 and 998, but all were actually bishops elsewhere whose cities were confused with Matera. The earliest surviving evidence of the bishops in Matera dates from 968, according to Bishop Liutprand of Cremona, when the Patriarch of Constantinople, at the command of the Byzantine Emperor Nikephoros II Phokas, ordered the diocese of Matera, with several other dioceses of the region, to be subordinated to the Archdiocese of Otranto and to conduct the liturgy exclusively according to the Byzantine Rite.

On 13 April 1068, Pope Alexander II issued a bull, granted the pallium to Archbishop Arnaldus of Acerenza and confirming him in the archbishopric of Acerenza, including all of the parishes and towns belonging to it, including Tricarico, Montepiloso, Gravina, and Materia. Matera, it seems, was not an independent town or bishopric yet.

=== Union of Matera and Acerenza ===
The diocese of Matera was combined by a papal bull of Pope Innocent III of 4 May 1203 with the Archdiocese of Acerenza to form the Archdiocese of Acerenza and Matera, and the building of the present Matera Cathedral on the site of the church of Saint Eustace began in the same year. The archbishop of Acerenza was at the same time the bishop of Matera, aeque personaliter.

=== Matera made a metropolitan archdiocese ===
On 2 July 1954, Pope Pius XII issued the bull Acheronta et Matera, in which he revived the diocese of Matera as a metropolitan archbishopric, separate from the metropolitan archdiocese of Acerenza, with its own ecclesiastical province including the dioceses of Anglona-Turso and Tricarico as its suffragans.

=== Matera and Acerenza made suffragan bishoprics ===
Pope Paul VI ordered a reorganization of the ecclesiastical provinces in southern Italy by the bull Quo aptius of 21 August 1976. The ecclesiastical provinces of Acerenza and of Matera were abolished, and a new province, that of Potenza, was created, to which both Acerenza and Matera were assigned as suffragan bishops. The episcopal authority in Matera was allowed to retain the honorary title of "archbishop".

=== Reorganization of ecclesiastical structure of southern Italy ===
Following the Second Vatican Council, and in accordance with the norms laid out in the council's decree, Christus Dominus chapter 40, Pope Paul VI ordered a reorganization of the ecclesiastical provinces in southern Italy. The decree "Eo quod spirituales" of 12 September 1976 created a new episcopal conference in the region called "Basilicata", to which were assigned all of the dioceses that belonged to the ecclesiastical province of Potenza, including Materana and Mons Pelusii; they had formerly belonged to the episcopal conference of "Apulia".

Matera was united on 11 October 1976 with the Roman Catholic Diocese of Gravina-Montepeloso to form the Diocese of Matera e Irsina. The diocese of Gravina maintained its own integrity, and became a suffragan of the archdiocese of Bari-Bitonto.

On 3 December 1977 however the diocese was elevated to the rank of archdiocese.

The diocese, in its current configuration, was established in order to conform to Italian civil law which was embodied in the Concordat between the Vatican and the Italian Republic of 18 February 1984. After extensive consultations, Pope John Paul II decreed that the status of the bishop governing several dioceses aeque personaliter was abolished, and that the Diocese of Matera was therefore merged with the Diocese of Monte Pelosii to form a single diocese. The changes were embodied in a decree of the Sacred Congregation of Bishops in the Roman Curia, promulgated on 30 September 1986. The seat of the merged dioceses was to be in Matera, and the official name of the diocese was to be "Archidioecesis Materanensis-Montis Pelusii". The diocesan offices (curia) was to be in Matera, as was the diocesan tribunal, the diocesan seminary, the College of Consultors, the Priests' Council, unless otherwise directed by the bishop.

== Archbishops ==
=== Archbishops of Matera ===
- Giacomo Palombella (1954–1974)
- Michele Giordano (1974 – 21 Aug 1976)

=== Bishop of Matera ===
- Michele Giordano (21 Aug – 11 Oct 1976)

=== Bishop of Matera e Irsina ===
- Michele Giordano (11 Oct 1976 – 3 Dec 1977)

=== Archbishop of Matera e Irsina ===
- Michele Giordano (3 Dec 1977 – 30 Dec 1986)

=== Archbishops of Matera-Irsina ===
- Michele Giordano (30 September 1986 – 9 May 1987, when he became Archbishop of Naples)
- Ennio Appignanesi (21 January 1988 – 19 January 1993, when he became Archbishop of Potenza-Muro Lucano-Marsico Nuovo)
- Antonio Ciliberti (6 May 1993 – 31 January 2003, when he became Archbishop of Catanzaro-Squillace)
- Salvatore Ligorio (20 March 2004 – 5 October 2015, when he became Archbishop of Potenza-Muro Lucano-Marsico Nuovo)
- Antonio Giuseppe Caiazzo (12 February 2016 – 7 January 2025, when he was appointed Archbishop (as a personal title) of the Diocese of Cesena-Sarsina)
- Benoni Ambăruș (since 18 June 2025)

== See also ==
- Matera Cathedral
- Irsina Cathedral
- Archdiocese of Acerenza

== Bibliography ==
- Cappelletti, Giuseppe (1870). Le chiese d'Italia: dalla loro origine sino ai nostri giorni (in Italian). Vol. vigesimo (20). Venezia: G. Antonelli. pp. 417–452.
- D'Avino, Vincenzio (1848). Cenni storici sulle chiese arcivescovili, vescovili, e prelatizie (nullius) del regno delle due Sicilie (in Italian). Naples: dalle stampe di Ranucci. pp. 316–320.
- Mariani, Maria Stella Calò (1978). La cattedrale di Matera nel mediovea e nel rinascimento. (in Italian) Istituto per l'Automazione delle Casse di Risparmio Italiane - Amilcare Pizzi, Cinisello Balsamo 1978.
- Volpe, Francesco Paolo (1818). Memorie storiche di Matera (in Italian). Stamperia Simoniana. ISBN 9788870370393.
