= Julius Caesar Cantelmi =

Roman Catholic bishop

Most Reverend Julius Caesar Cantelmi
- Bishop of Montepeloso
- Church: Catholic Church
- Diocese: Diocese of Montepeloso
- In office: 1482–1491
- Predecessor: Antonius de Maffeis
- Successor: Leonardo Carmini

Personal details
- Born: 1457
- Died: Unknown

Julius Caesar Cantelmi (born 1457) was a Roman Catholic prelate who served as Bishop of Montepeloso (1482–1491).

== Biography ==
Julius Caesar Cantelmi was born in 1457. On 20 March 1482, he was appointed during the papacy of Pope Sixtus IV as Bishop of Montepeloso. He served as Bishop of Montepeloso until his resignation in 1491.

== External links and additional sources ==
- Cheney, David M. "Diocese of Montepeloso". Catholic-Hierarchy.org. (Chronology of Bishops) ^{[self-published]}
- Chow, Gabriel. "Diocese of Irsina (Italy)". GCatholic.org. (Chronology of Bishops) ^{[self-published]}

Catholic Church titles
Preceded by Antonius de Maffeis	Bishop of Montepeloso; 1482–1491	Succeeded by Leonardo Carmini
