= Richard of Andria =

Italian Roman Catholic saint

Saint Richard of Andria
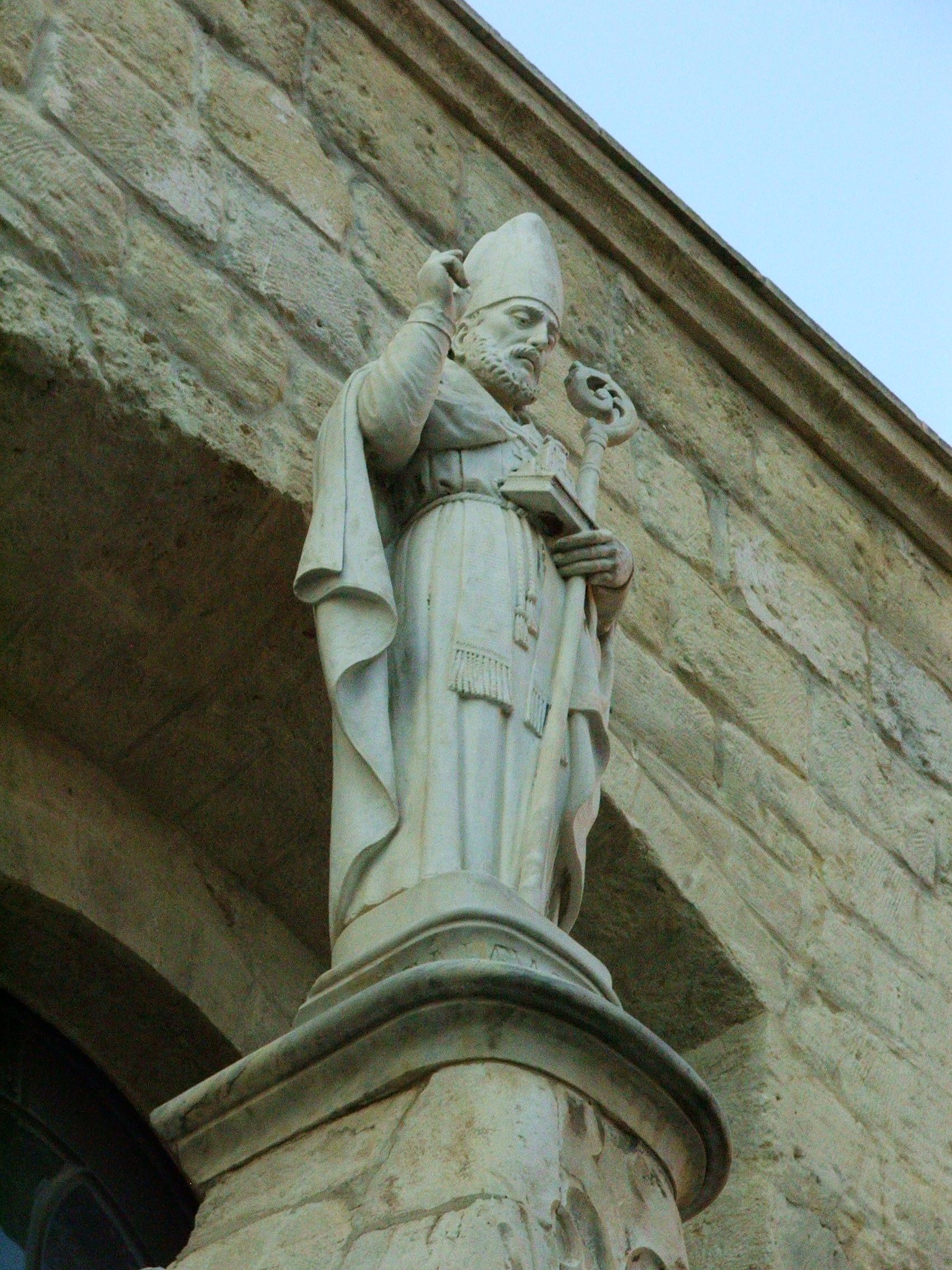

Bishop of Andria
- Born: England
- Died: 1196; Andria, Italy
- Venerated in: Roman Catholic Church
- Feast: 9 June
- Patronage: Andria, Italy Roman Catholic Diocese of Andria

Richard was Bishop of Andria, Italy. He was appointed to the see of Andria by fellow Englishman Pope Adrian IV. In 1179, Richard was one of the Bishops present at the Eleventh Ecumenical Council (Third Lateran, 1179) held by Pope Alexander III. He remained in his office until his death, a period of well over 40 years.

In 1438, under the rule of Duke Francesco II Del Balzo, a woman putatively rediscovered his remains under the main altar of the Cathedral where it was claimed they had been hidden during the Hungarian invasions. Under the patronage of Federico, he was able to obtain Richard's canonization by Pope Eugene IV.
