= Diocese of Andria =

Roman Catholic diocese in Italy

Coordinates: 41°13′54″N 16°18′30″E

Diocese of Andria Dioecesis Andriensis

Catholic
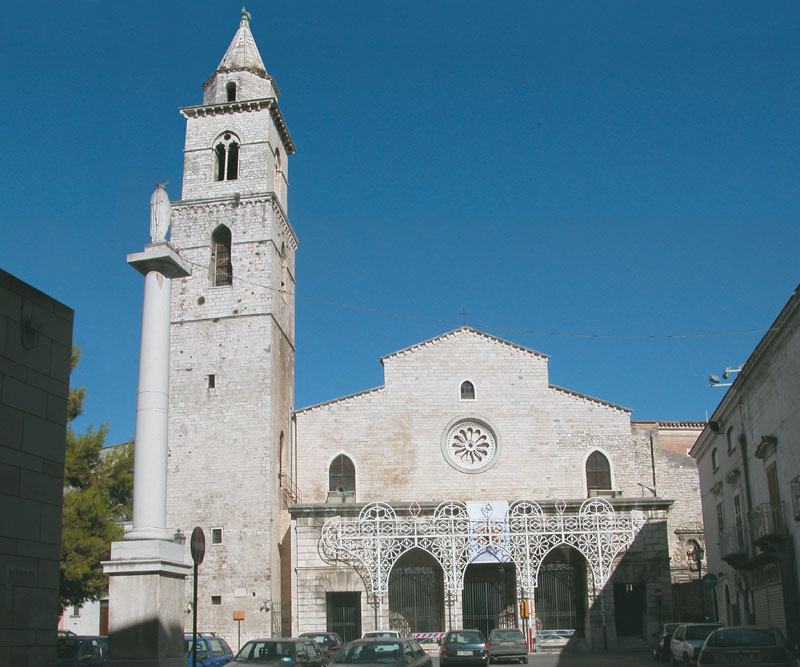
- Andria Cathedral

Location
- Country: Italy
- Metropolitan: Bari-Bitonto

Statistics
- Area: 799 km^{2} (308 sq mi)
- Population: Total; Catholics: (as of 2023); 145,041 ▲; 143,616 ▲ (99%)

Information
- Rite: Latin Rite
- Established: 11th Century
- Cathedral: Cattedrale di S. Maria Assunta
- Patron saint: Richard of Andria
- Secular priests: 72 (diocesan) ▲21 (religious Orders) ▲6 Permanent Deacons ▼

Current leadership
- Pope: Leo XIV
- Bishop: Luigi Mansi

Map
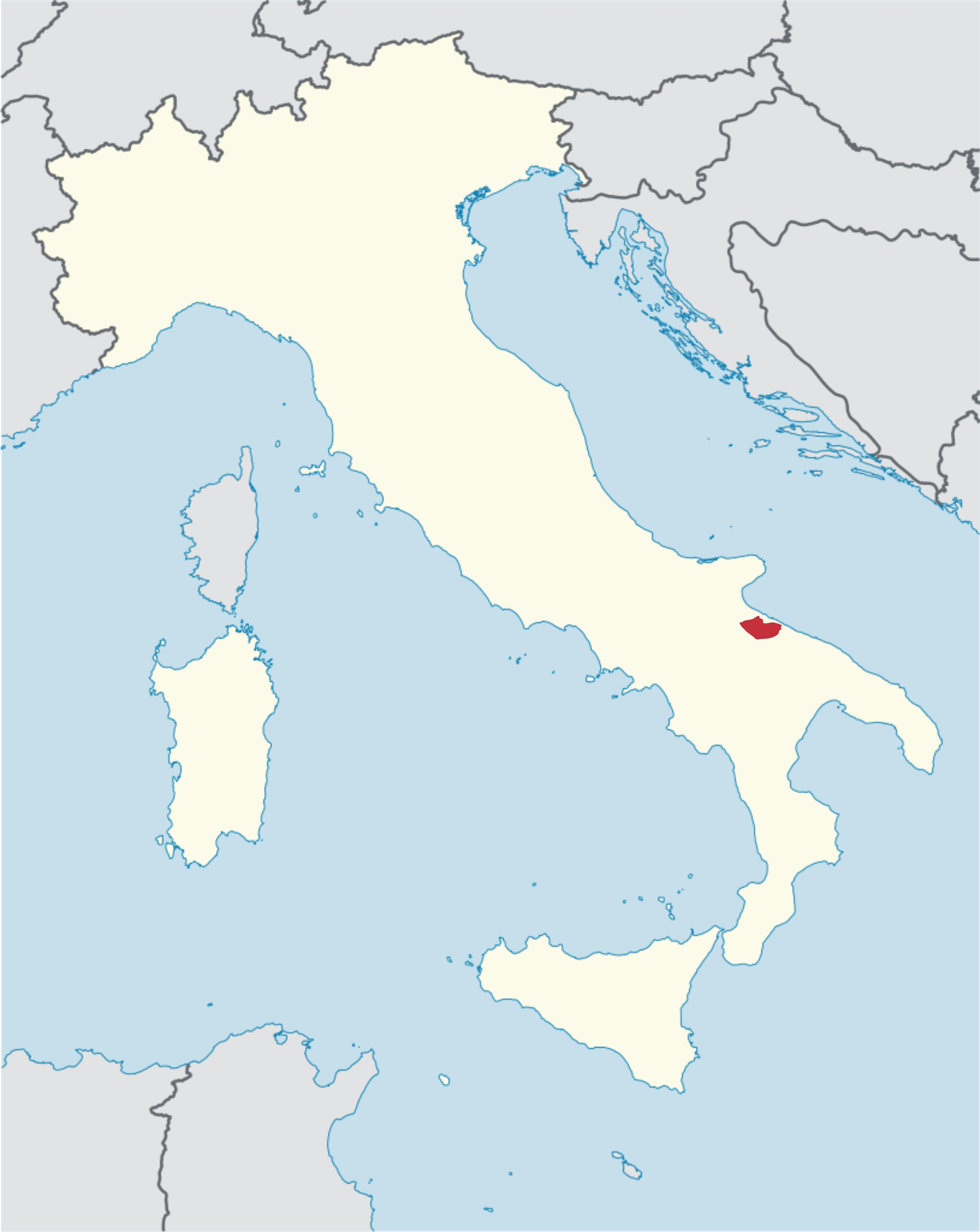

The Diocese of Andria (Latin: Dioecesis Andriensis) is a Latin diocese of the Catholic Church in Apulia, seated at Andria Cathedral which is built over a church dedicated to St. Peter, about ten miles southwest of Trani. It is a suffragan of the archdiocese of Bari-Bitonto. The diocese has 39 parishes, with one priest for every 1,573 Catholics.

== History ==
Tradition assigns the Christian origin of Andria to an Englishman, St. Richard, chosen as bishop by Pope Gelasius I, about 492 AD. The story has been dismissed as fable by some scholars. A Bishop Christopher of Andria is reported at the II Council of Nicaea in 787, but inspection shows that he was Christopher Bishop of Saint Cyriacus (Gerace).

The diocese dates probably back to the time of Gelasius II, elected Pope in 1118. The earliest known bishop of Andria, whose name is not preserved, took part in the translation of the body of Saint Nicholas the Pilgrim in Trani in 1143. Bishop Richard of Andria was present at the Eleventh Ecumenical Council (Third Lateran, 1179) held under Pope Alexander III.

It was united with the diocese of Montepeloso, from 1452 to 1479.

== Bishops ==
=== Diocese of Andria ===
Erected: 11th Century
Latin Name: Andriensis
Metropolitan: Archdiocese of Trani

...

- Richard (attested 1158–1196)
- Mathaeus (attested 1243)
- frater Joannes (attested 1269–1274)

...

- Placidus (attested 1290, 1304)
- Joannes (attested 1318)
- Dominicus (attested 1319)
- Joannes de Alexandria, O.E.S.A. (10 November 1348 – 1349)
- Andreas, O.E.S.A. (14 March 1349 – ? )
- Joannes (attested 1356)
- Marcus
- Lucidus de Nursia, O.E.S.A. (20 December 1374 – 1379/1380)
- Franciscus (c. 1380 – ? )
- Milillus Sabanicae, O.E.S.A. (16 January 1392 – 1418)
- Franciscus de Nigris (12 August 1418 – 1435?)
- Joannes Donadei (14 November 1435 – 1451)

=== Diocese of Andria-Montepeloso ===
United: 1452 with the Diocese of Montepeloso
Latin Name: Andriensis-Montis Pelusii

- Antonellus, O.Min. (20 September 1452 – 1463?)
- Matthaeus Antonius (3 April 1463 – 1465?)
- Franciscus de Bertinis (20 October 1465 – 18 September 1471)
- Martin Sotomayor, O.Carm. (18 September 1471 – March 1477)
- Angelus Florus (1477 – 1495)

=== Diocese of Andria ===
==== 1479 to 1800 ====
Split: 1479 into the Diocese of Andria and the Diocese of Montepeloso
Latin Name: Andriensis

- Angelus Florus (1477 – 1495)
- Geronimo Porcari (26 April 1495 – 1503 Died)
- Antonio de Roccamoro, O.F.M. (1503 –1515 Resigned)
- Andrea Pastore (26 March 1515 – 1516 Died)
- Simone de Nor (12 December 1516 – 1517 Died)
- Niccolò Fieschi (1517–1517 Resigned)
- Giovanni Francesco Fieschi (1517–1565 Resigned)
- Luca Fieschi (1566–1582 Appointed, Bishop of Albenga)
- Luca Antonio Resta (1582–1597 Died)
- Vincenzo Bassi (1598–1603 Died)
- Antonio de Franchis, C.R. (1604–1625 Died)
- Vincenzo Caputo (1625–1626 Died)
- Alessandro Strozzi (1626–1632)
- Felice Franceschini, O.F.M. Conv. (26 April 1632 – 8 October 1641 Died)
- Ascanio Cassiani (16 December 1641 – 1657 Died)
- Alessandro Egizio (17 December 1657 – April 1689 Died)
- Pietro Vecchia (bishop), O.S.B. (1690 – 19 December 1691)
- Francesco Antonio Triveri, O.F.M. Conv. (21 January 1692 – 24 September 1696)
- Andrea Ariani (14 January 1697 – 1706 Died)
- Nicola Adinolfi (6 December 1706 – 1715 Died)
- Giovanni Paolo Torti Rogadei, O.S.B. (1718–1726)
- Cherubino Tommaso Nobilione, O.P. (1726–1743 Resigned)
- Domenico Anelli (20 May 1743– 14 July 1756 Died)
- Francesco Ferrante (1757–1772 Died)
- Saverio Palica, O.S.B. (1773–1791 Died)
- Salvatore Maria Lombardi (27 February 1792 – 1821 Died)

==== since 1818 ====
1818: Territory Added from the suppressed Diocese of Minervino Murge

- Giovanni Battista Bolognese (1822 – 1830 Died)
- Giuseppe Cosenza (1832–1850)
- Giovanni Giuseppe Longobardi (1852–1870 Died)
- Federico Maria Galdi (1872–1899 Died)
- Giuseppe Staiti di Brancaleone (1899–1916 Died)
- Eugenio Tosi, O.Ss.C.A. (1917–1922 Appointed, Archbishop of Milan)
- Alessandro Macchi (1922–1930 Appointed, Bishop of Como)
- Ferdinando Bernardi (1931–1935 Appointed, Archbishop of Taranto)
- Paolo Rostagno (1935–1939 Appointed, Bishop of Ivrea)
- Giuseppe Di Donna, O.SS.T. (1940–1952 Died)
- Luigi Pirelli (1952–1957 Resigned)
- Francesco Brustia (1957–1969 Resigned)
- Giuseppe Lanave (1969–1988 Retired)
- Raffaele Calabro (1988–2016 Retired)
- Luigi Mansi (2016–)

== Books ==
=== Reference works ===
- Eubel, Conradus, ed. (1913). Hierarchia catholica, Tomus 1 (second ed.). Münster: Libreria Regensbergiana. (in Latin)
- Eubel, Conradus, ed. (1914). Hierarchia catholica, Tomus 2 (second ed.). Münster: Libreria Regensbergiana. (in Latin)
- Eubel, Conradus, ed. (1923). Hierarchia catholica, Tomus 3 (second ed.). Münster: Libreria Regensbergiana.
- Gams, Pius Bonifatius (1873). Series episcoporum Ecclesiae catholicae: quotquot innotuerunt a beato Petro apostolo. Ratisbon: Typis et Sumptibus Georgii Josephi Manz. pp. 898–899. (Use with caution; obsolete)
- Gauchat, Patritius (Patrice) (1935). Hierarchia catholica IV (1592-1667). Münster: Libraria Regensbergiana. (in Latin)
- Ritzler, Remigius; Sefrin, Pirminus (1952). Hierarchia catholica medii et recentis aevi V (1667-1730). Patavii: Messagero di S. Antonio. (in Latin)
- Ritzler, Remigius; Sefrin, Pirminus (1958). Hierarchia catholica medii et recentis aevi VI (1730-1799). Patavii: Messagero di S. Antonio. (in Latin)
- Ritzler, Remigius; Sefrin, Pirminus (1968). Hierarchia Catholica medii et recentioris aevi sive summorum pontificum, S. R. E. cardinalium, ecclesiarum antistitum series... A pontificatu Pii PP. VII (1800) usque ad pontificatum Gregorii PP. XVI (1846) (in Latin). Vol. VII. Monasterii: Libr. Regensburgiana.
- Ritzler, Remigius; Pirminus Sefrin (1978). Hierarchia catholica Medii et recentioris aevi... A Pontificatu PII PP. IX (1846) usque ad Pontificatum Leonis PP. XIII (1903) (in Latin). Vol. VIII. Il Messaggero di S. Antonio.
- Pięta, Zenon (2002). Hierarchia catholica medii et recentioris aevi... A pontificatu Pii PP. X (1903) usque ad pontificatum Benedictii PP. XV (1922) (in Latin). Vol. IX. Padua: Messagero di San Antonio. ISBN 978-88-250-1000-8.

=== Studies ===
- Cappelletti, Giuseppe (1870). Le chiese d'Italia dalla loro origine sino ai nostri giorni (in Italian). Vol. vigesimoprimo (21). Venezia: Antonelli. pp. 394–399.
- D'Avino, Vincenzio (1848). Cenni storici sulle chiese arcivescovili, vescovili, e prelatizie (nullius) del regno delle due Sicilie (in Italian). Naples: dalle stampe di Ranucci. pp. 18–20.
- Kamp, Norbert (1975). Kirche und Monarchie im staufischen Königreich Sizilien: I. Prosopographische Grundlegung, Bistumer und Bistümer und Bischöfe des Konigreichs 1194–1266: 2. Apulien und Calabrien München: Wilhelm Fink 1975.
- Kehr, Paulus Fridolin (1962). Italia pontificia. Regesta pontificum Romanorum. Vol. IX: Samnia – Apulia – Lucania. Berlin: Weidmann. (in Latin), pp. 307–308.
- Lanzoni, Francesco (1927). Le diocesi d'Italia dalle origini al principio del secolo VII (an. 604) (in Italian). Rome: Biblioteca Apostolica Vaticana. pp. 312–317.
- Loconte, R. (1962). I vescovi di Andria (Andria 1962). (in Italian)
- Romano, Michele (1842b). Saggio sulla storia di Molfetta dall'epoca dell'antica Respa sino al 1840 del dottor fisico Michele Romano: 2 (in Italian). Vol. Parte seconda. Napoli: De Bonis.
- Ughelli, Ferdinando; Coleti, Niccolò (1721). Italia sacra, sive De Episcopis Italiae (in Latin). Vol. Tomus septimus (VII). Venice: apud Sebastianum Coleti. pp. 920–935.
