= San Tommaso in Formis =

Small church in Rome

Coordinates: 41°53′07″N 12°29′43″E

The church of San Tommaso in Formis is a small church in Rome, which is situated on the Caelian Hill. It is served by the Trinitarian Friars.

== History ==
Situated on the edge of Villa Celimontana and next to the Arch of Dolabella (Porta Caelimontana), a gate in the original Servian Wall, the church is dedicated to St. Thomas the Apostle. It is built into the side of the Claudian Aqueduct, from which comes in formis (forma claudia is Latin for the Claudian Aqueduct).

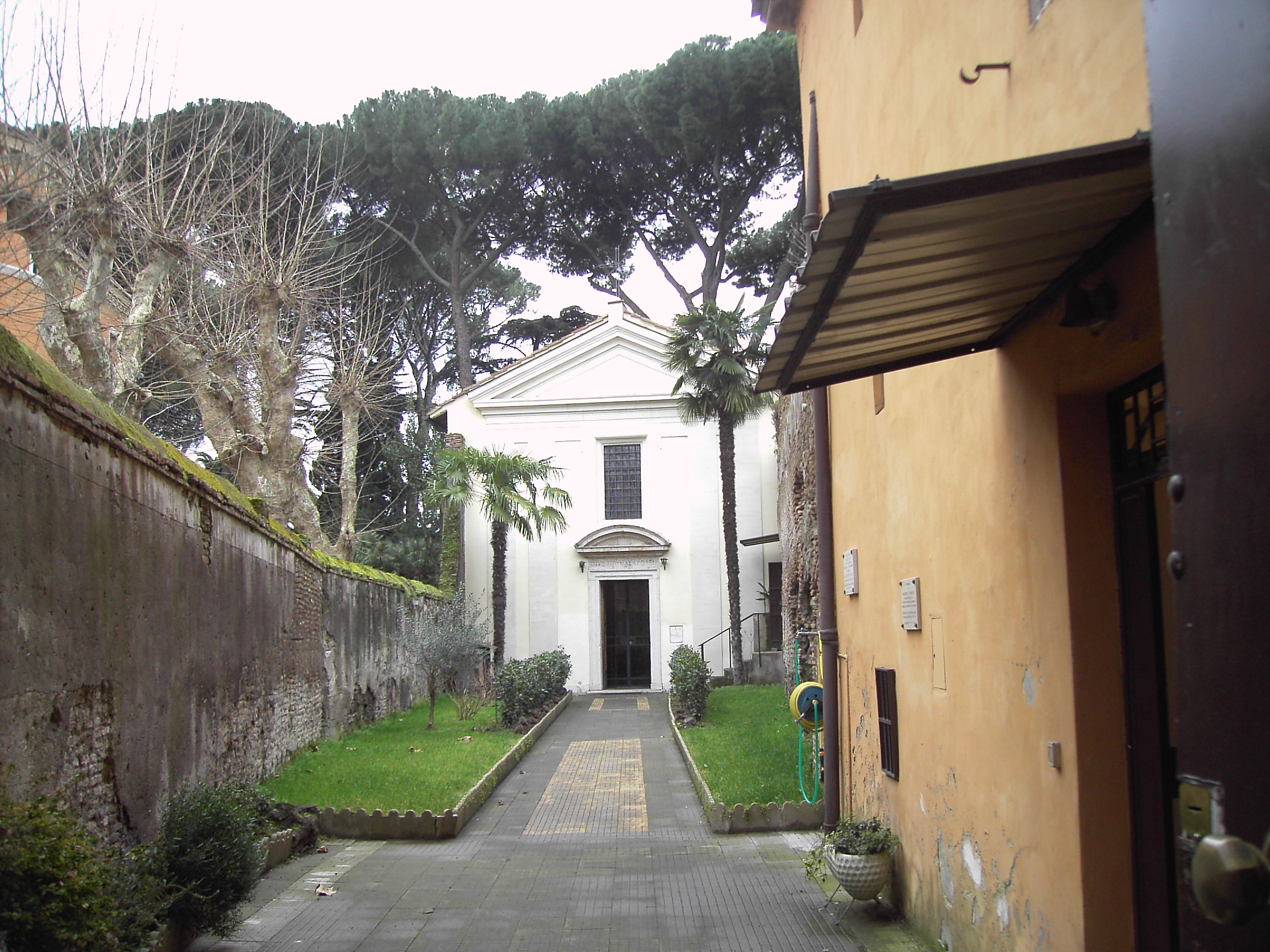
San Tommaso in Formis

The church is believed to date back to the 10th Century, although the first certain date of its existence is 1209, when Pope Innocent III gave ownership of the church with the attached monastery to the Trinitarian Order whose founder, Saint John of Matha, lived there and made it the Order's headquarters. He adapted part of the monastery to become a hospital. Saint Francis of Assisi often stayed at the monastery. Around 1380 the Order was forced to leave Rome. In time, under the control of the Vatican, the complex became more or less abandoned. In 1532 the first steps towards restoration were undertaken and in 1571 Pope Pius V returned the church, hospital and monastery to the Trinitarians. In 1590, following the death of Pius V, the church reverted once again to the Vatican and, in 1663, was completely reconstructed to its present form. It was not returned to the Trinitarian Order until 1898 on occasion of the 700th anniversary of the Order’s foundation. Use of the church and buildings was given in perpetuity on 27 March 1920. The hospital was demolished in 1925.

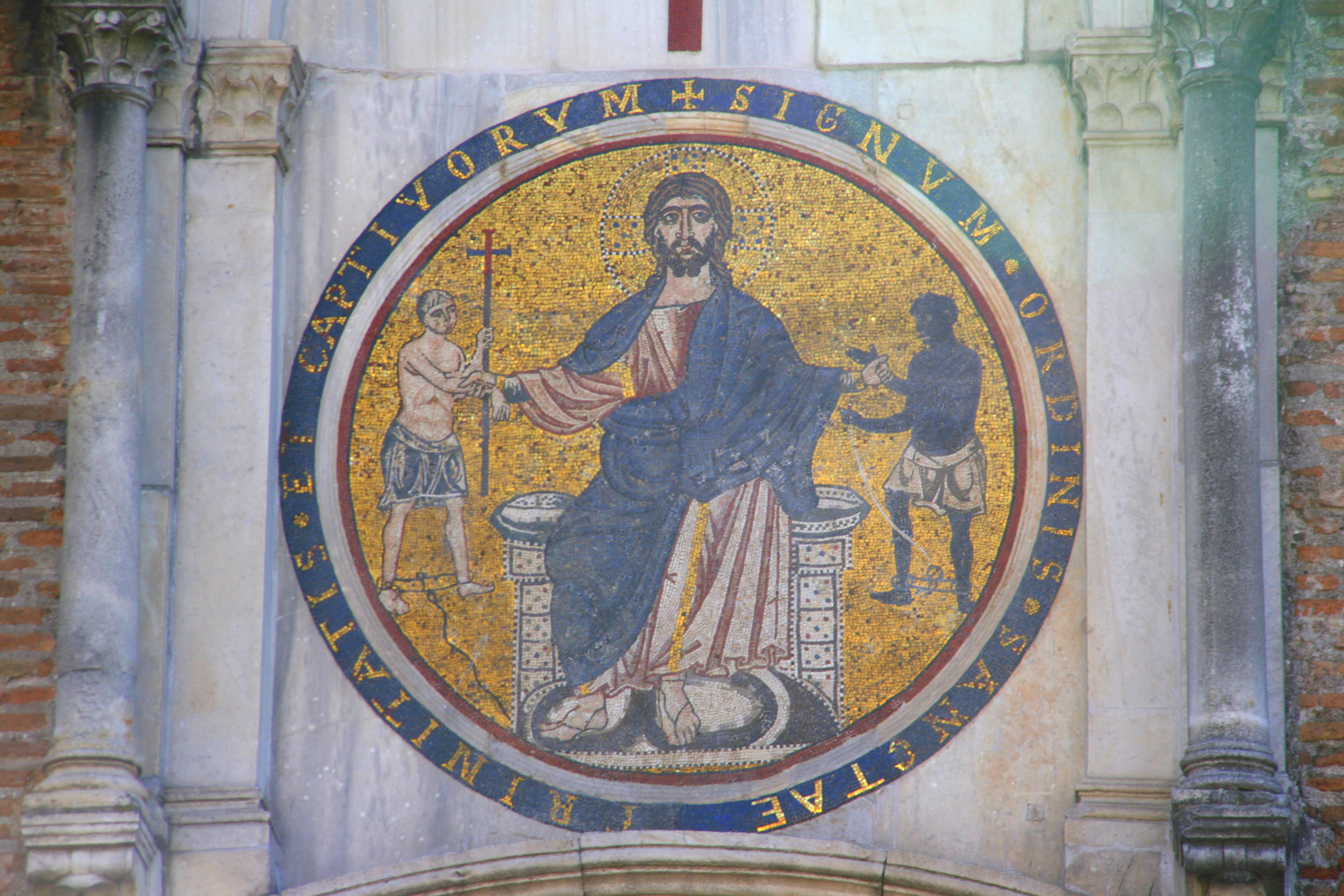
Christ between two freed slaves, 13th Century mosaic by Lorenzo Cosmati

The northeast façade of the complex has a Romanesque entrance with a 13th Century mosaic by Lorenzo Cosmati of Christ between two freed slaves. This is the ancient door that was used in the 1952 movie, When in Rome, when Van Johnson and Paul Douglas escape from the police. The mosaic also depicts the Seal of the Trinitarian Order. The founding intention for the Order was the ransom of Christians held captive by non-Christians during the time of the Crusades.

== Stained glass ==
To celebrate the Great Jubilee of 2000, seven stained glass windows were commissioned from Samuele Pulcini, depicting important people relevant to the Order, namely: St John of Matha, St Felix of Valois, St John Baptist of the Conception, Teresa Cucchiari, Giuseppe Di Donna, Anna Maria Taigi, and Elizabeth Canori Mora.

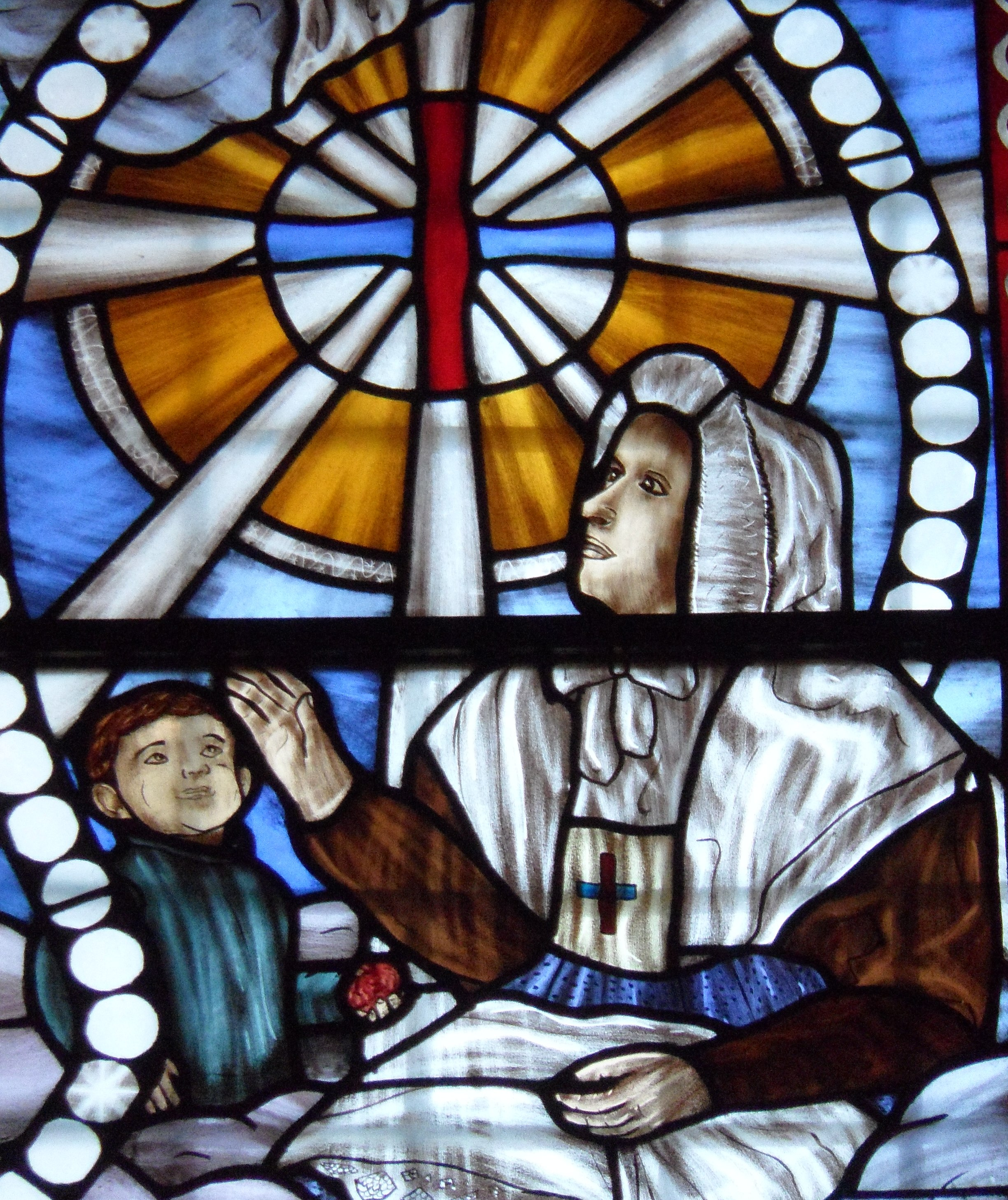
Stained glass depicting Anna Maria Taigi

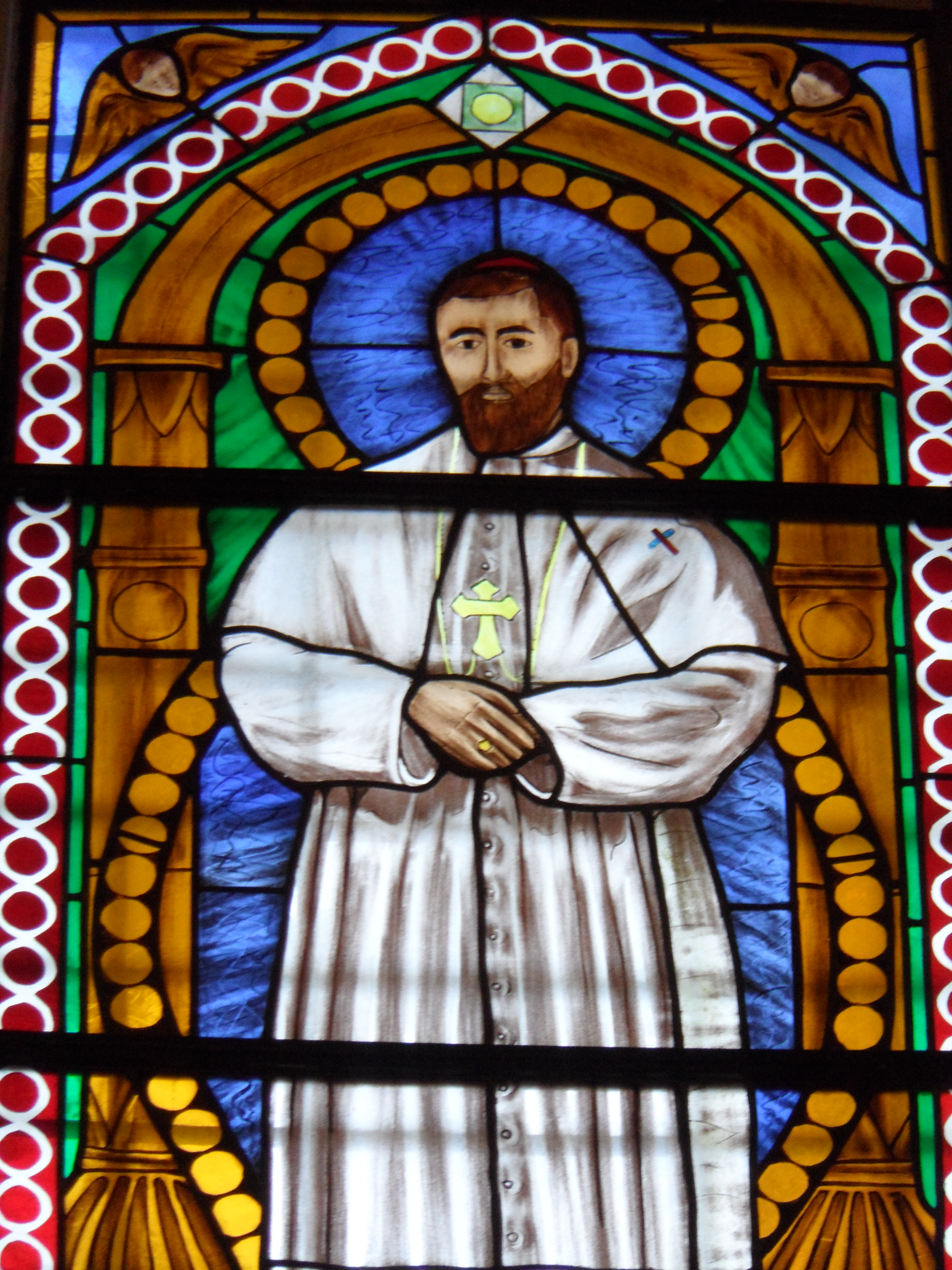
Stained glass depicting Giuseppe Di Donna

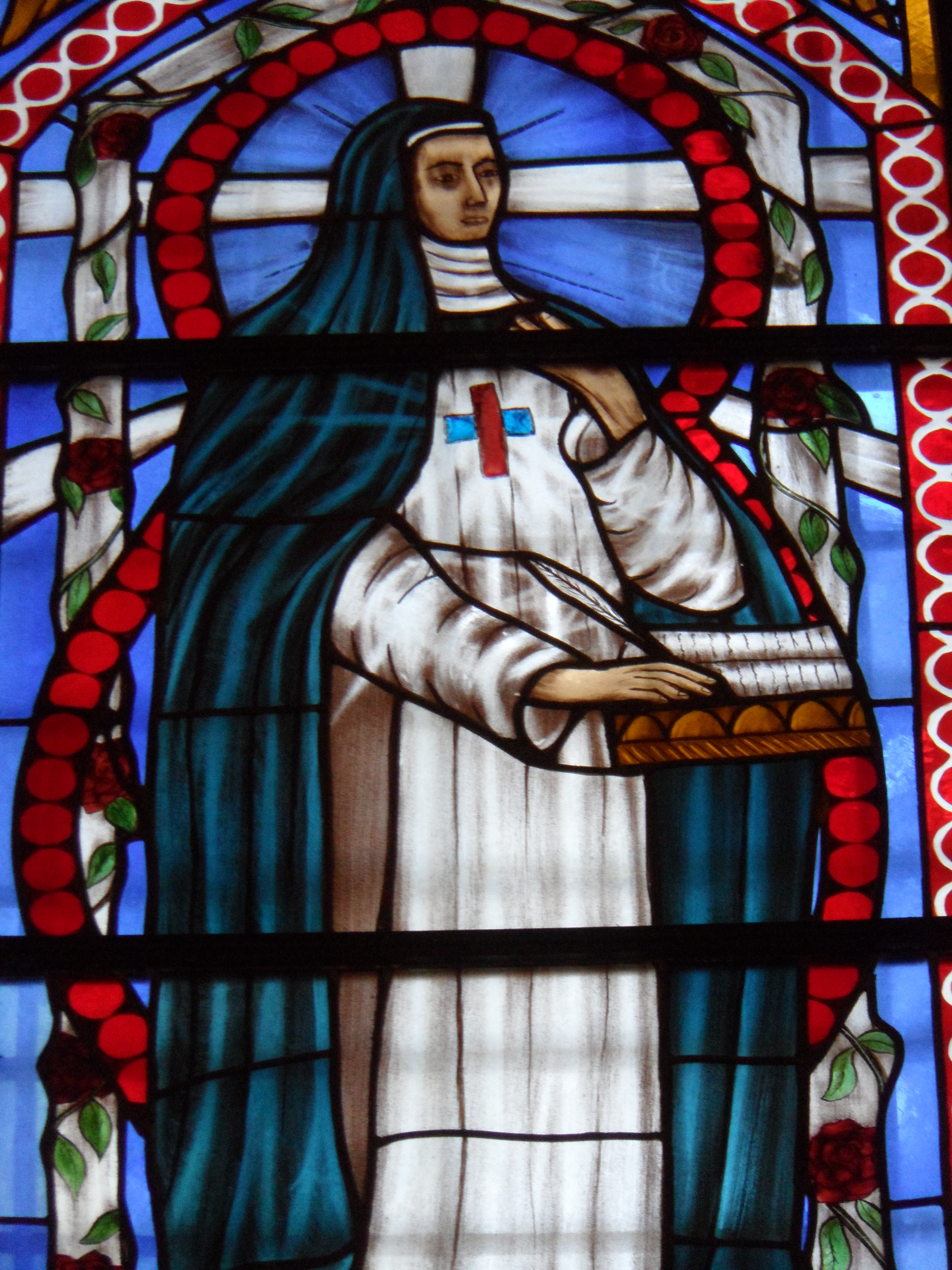
Stained glass depicting Maria Teresa Cucchiari

== See also ==
- Bill Thayer's Web Site (Gazetteer of Rome)Gazetteer of Rome • Church of S. Tommaso in Formis
