= Matera Cathedral =

Cathedral in Matera, Basilicata, Italy

Coordinates: 40.6668°N 16.6113°E

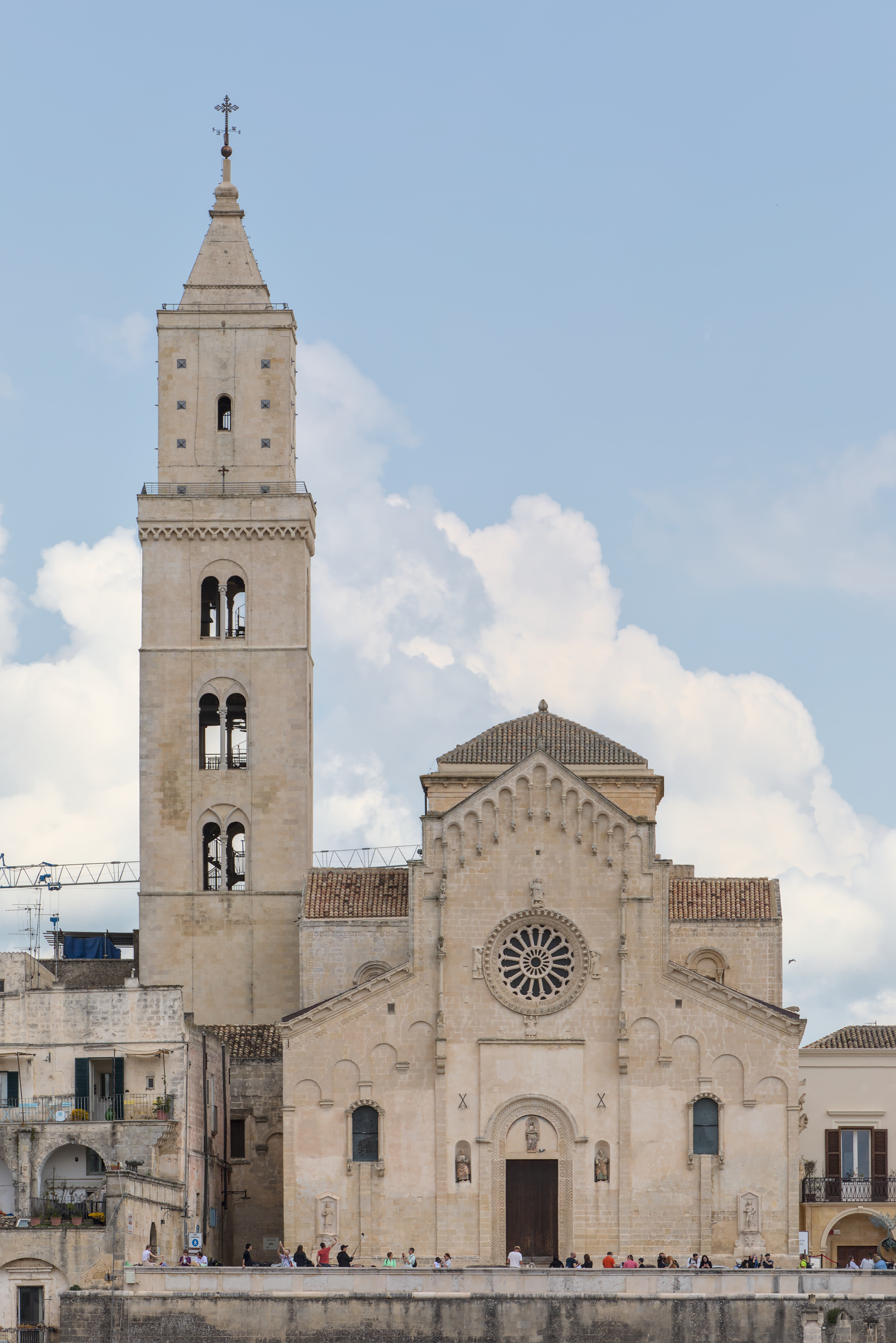
- Matera Cathedral, west front

Religion
- Affiliation: Catholic Church
- Rite: Roman Rite
- Ecclesiastical or organisational status: Cathedral
- Status: Active

Location
- Location: Matera, Basilicata
- State: Italy
- Interactive map of Matera Cathedral

Architecture
- Type: Church
- Groundbreaking: 1230
- Completed: 1270

Specifications
- Length: 40 metres (130 ft)
- Width: 55 metres (180 ft)
- Height (max): 60 metres (200 ft)
- Spire: one
- Spire height: 90 metres (300 ft)

Matera Cathedral (Italian: Duomo di Matera, Cattedrale di Santa Maria della Bruna e di Sant'Eustachio) is a Roman Catholic cathedral in Matera, Basilicata, Italy. It is dedicated to the Virgin Mary under the designation of the Madonna della Bruna and to Saint Eustace. Formerly the seat of the Bishops, later Archbishops, of Matera, it is now the cathedral of the Archdiocese of Matera-Irsina.

== History ==
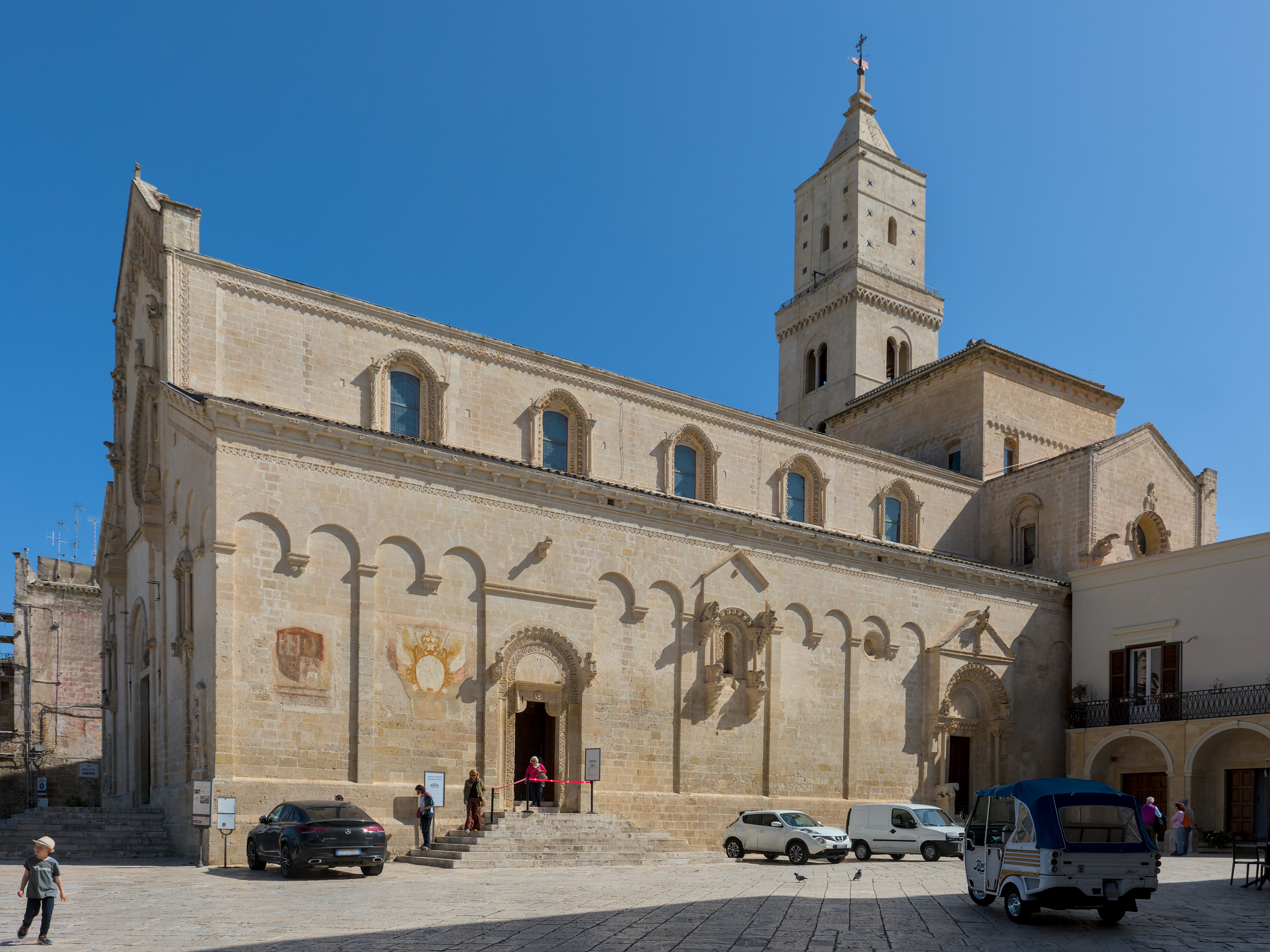
South view.

The cathedral was built in Apulian Romanesque style in the 13th century on the ridge that forms the highest point of the city of Matera and divides the two Sassi, on the site of the ancient Church of Saint Eustace, protector of the city. Construction began in 1203, the year in which Pope Innocent III raised Matera to the rank of an archdiocese in union with Acerenza as the Archdiocese of Acerenza and Matera, and was completed in 1270.

The original dedication was to Santa Maria di Matera, as recorded in a contemporary notarial document. Then, on the evidence of a will of 1318, it was entitled Santa Maria dell'Episcopio, and from 1389, the year in which Pope Urban VI (already Archbishop of Matera), instituted the feast of the Visitation, it was dedicated to Santa Maria della Bruna, also a protector of the city. Finally, from 1627 Monsignor Fabrizio Antinori, archbishop of Matera, dedicated the cathedral to the Madonna della Bruna and to Saint Eustace.

== Description ==
The west front is dominated by the rose window of sixteen rays and by the campanile on the left side, 52 metres high. The cathedral has a Latin cross ground plan and contains three naves, separated by round arches supported by columns with stone capitals. Much of the interior received a Baroque-style decoration in the 17th and 18th century, including gilded stuccoes and frames.

The interior has an Italo-Byzantine fresco depicting the Madonna della Bruna and Child, dating from 1270 and attributed to one Rinaldo da Taranto; the relics of Saint John of Matera (translated here in 1830); carved wooden choir stalls (60 in total) in the apse (1453), by Giovanni Tantino of Ariano Irpino; a sculptural group of a Pesebre (1534, Nativity scene) and painted limestone crib, both created by Altobello Persio; the Chapel of the Annunciation erected in Renaissance-style by Giulio Persio; and a 14th-century fresco depicting the Last Judgment, which re-emerged during recent restoration work. The high altar has an altarpiece by Fabrizio Santafede depicting The Virgin with Saints.

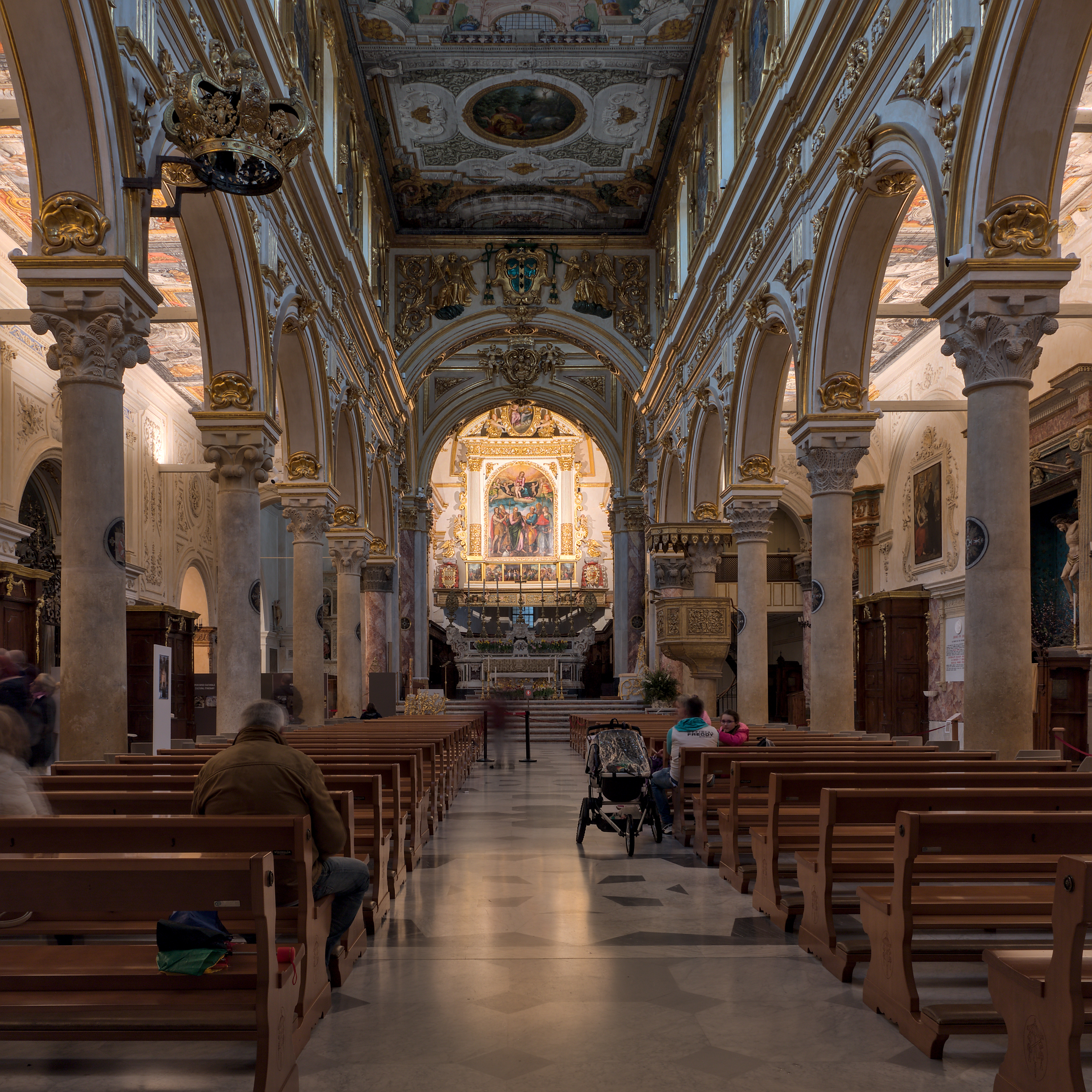
Nave

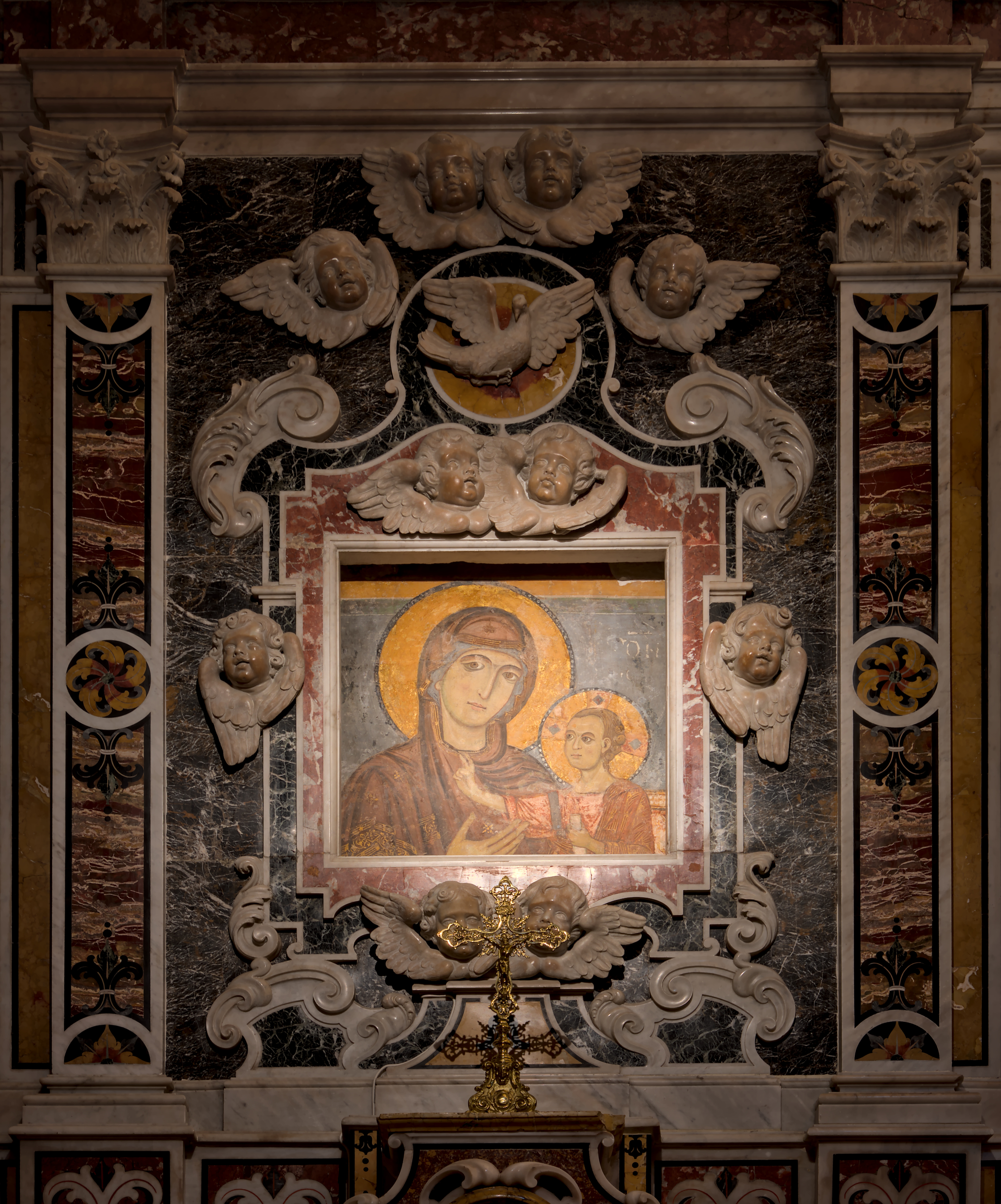
13th-century painting of the Madonna della Bruna

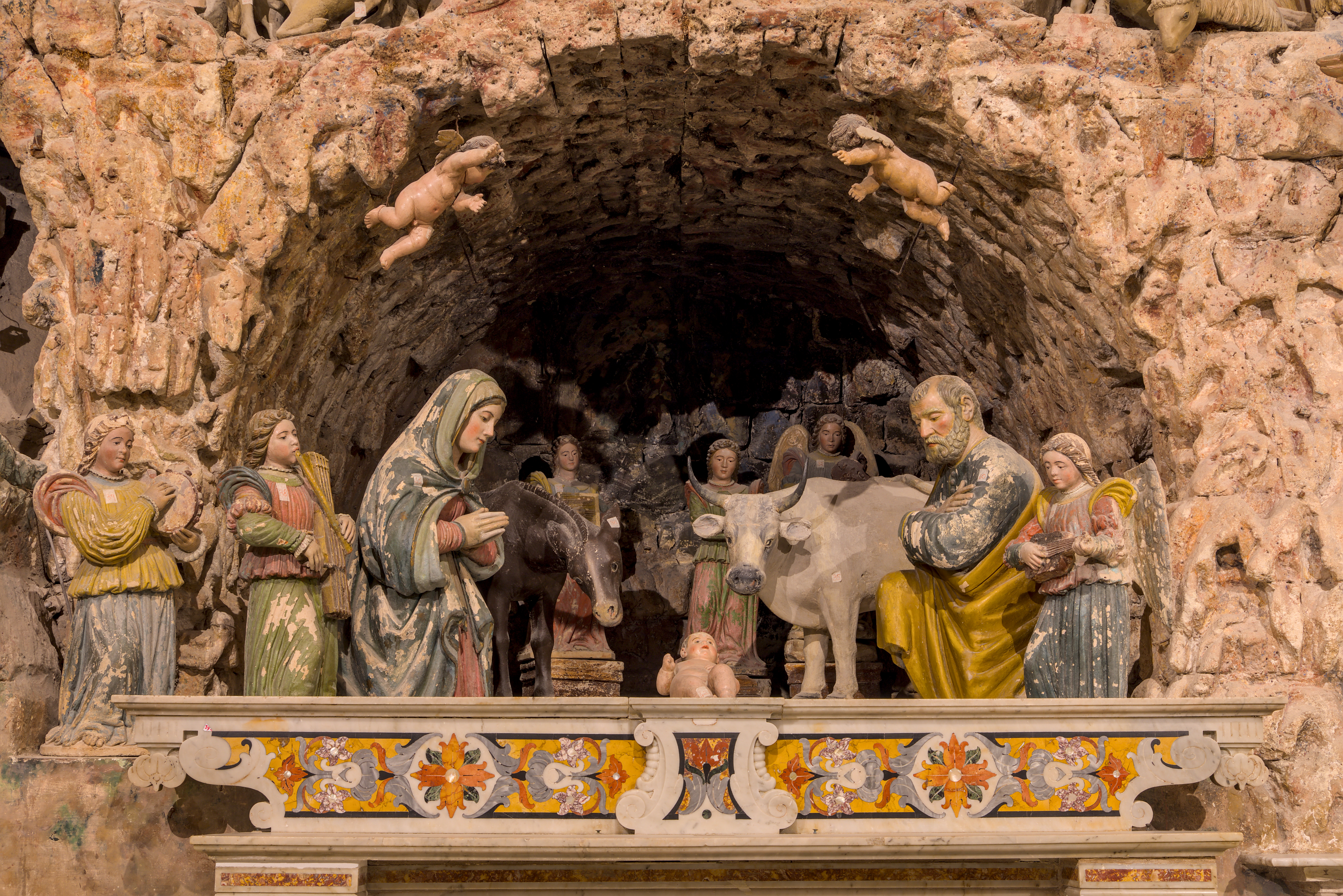
1535 Nativity scene by Altobello Persio

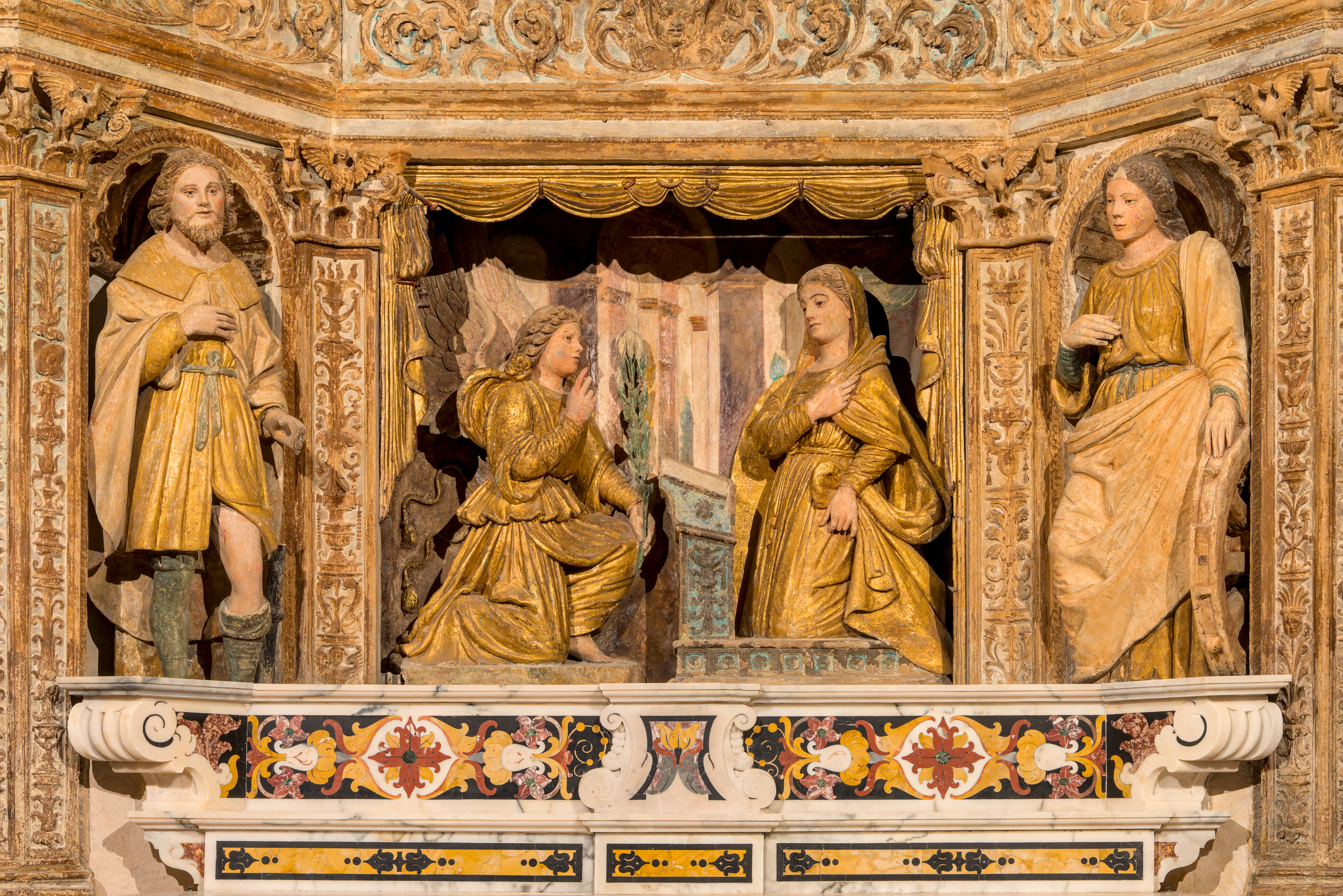
Sculptural group of the Annunziation

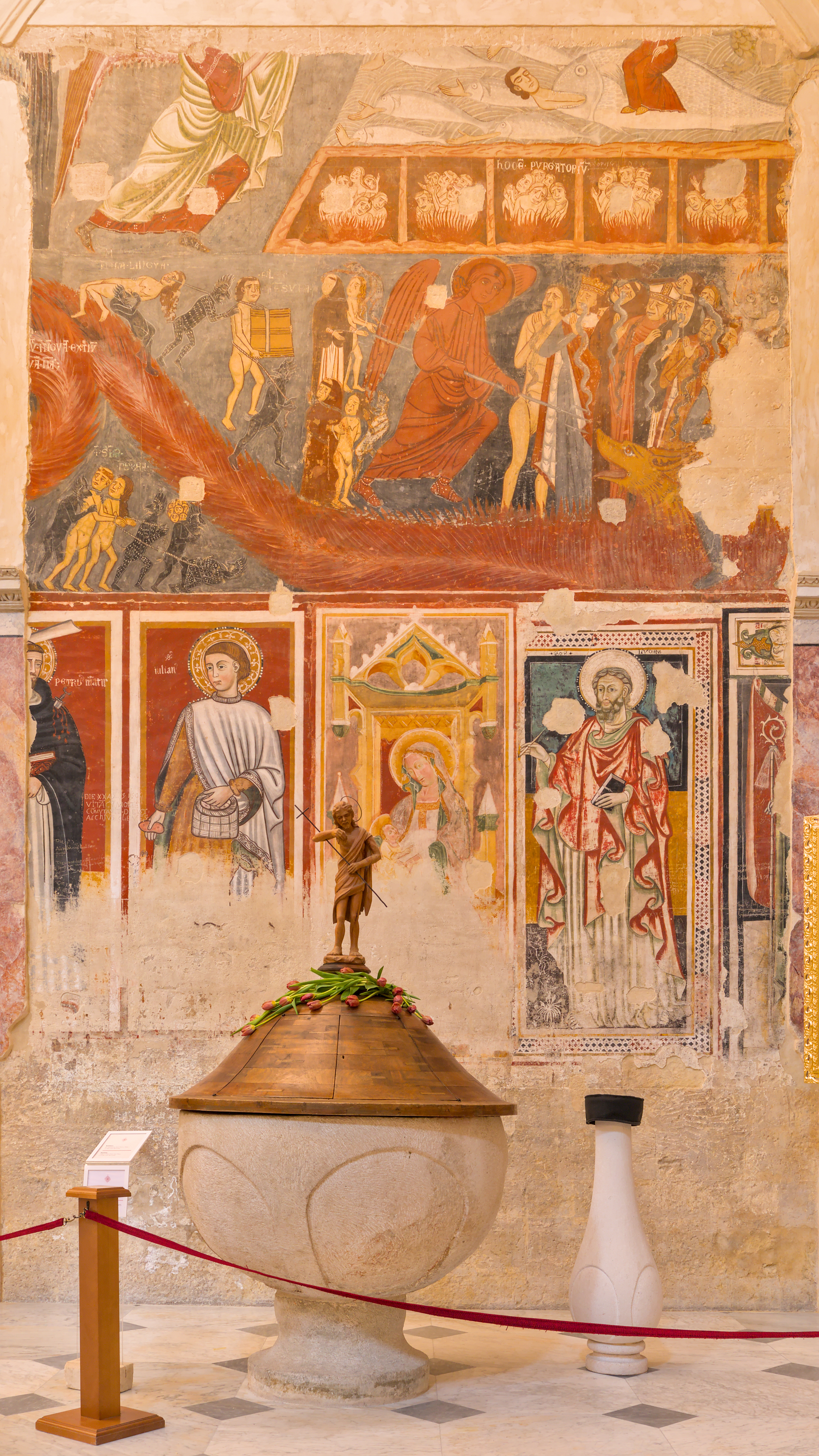
Baptismal fonts and 14-15th-century frescos, one of them depicting the Last Judgment

== Sources and external links ==
- Matera website: Cathedral (in Italian)
- Website of the Consiglio di Basilicata: La Cattedrale di Matera (in Italian)
