= Leonardo Carmini =

Italian Catholic bishop (died 1502)

Most Reverend Leonardo Carmini
- Bishop of Trivento
- Church: Catholic Church
- Diocese: Roman Catholic Diocese of Trivento
- In office: 1498–1502
- Successor: Tommaso Caracciolo

Personal details
- Died: 1502 Trivento, Italy

Leonardo Carmini (also given as Corvino or Corbera; died 1502) was a Roman Catholic prelate who served as Bishop of Trivento (1498–1502) and Bishop of Montepeloso (1491–1498).

== Biography ==
On 10 January 1491, Leonardo Carmini was appointed during the papacy of Pope Innocent VIII as Bishop of Montepeloso. On 21 November 1498, he was appointed during the papacy of Pope Alexander VI as Bishop of Trivento. He served as Bishop of Trivento until his death in 1502.

While bishop, he was the principal consecrator of Gaspard de Toriglia, Bishop of Santa Giusta (1494).

== External links and additional sources ==
- Cheney, David M. "Diocese of Montepeloso". Catholic-Hierarchy.org. (Chronology of Bishops) ^{[self-published]}
- Chow, Gabriel. "Diocese of Irsina (Italy)". GCatholic.org. (Chronology of Bishops) ^{[self-published]}
- Cheney, David M. "Diocese of Trivento". Catholic-Hierarchy.org. (for Chronology of Bishops) ^{[self-published]}
- Chow, Gabriel. "Diocese of Trivento (Italy)". GCatholic.org. (for Chronology of Bishops) ^{[self-published]}

Catholic Church titles
Preceded by Julius Caesar Cantelmi	Bishop of Montepeloso; 1491–1498	Succeeded by Marco Copula
Preceded by	Bishop of Trivento; 1498–1502	Succeeded by Tommaso Caracciolo
