= Giuseppe Di Donna =

Italian Roman Catholic bishop (1901–1952)

Venerable Giuseppe Di Donna O.SS.T.
- Bishop of Andria
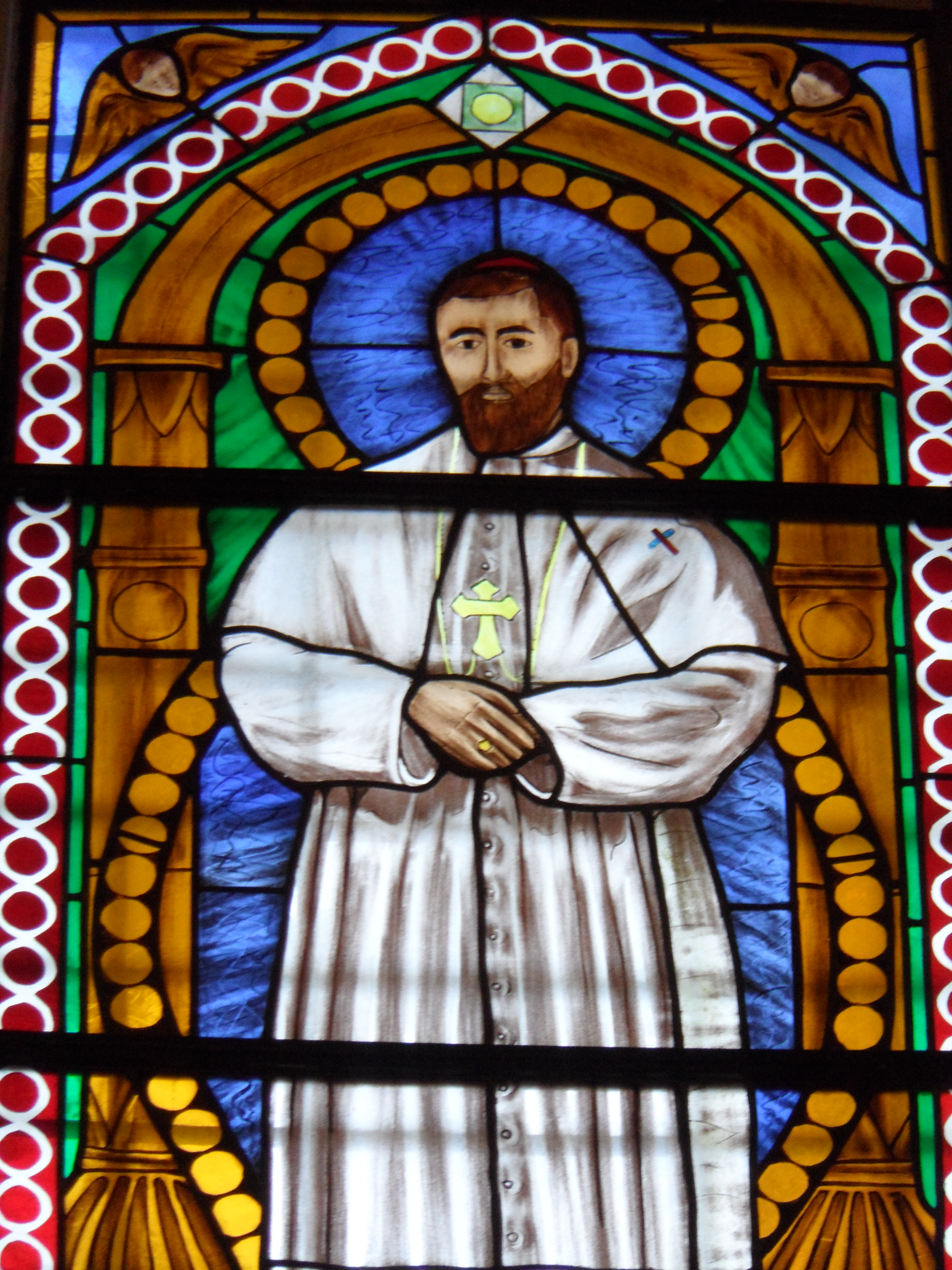
- Church: Roman Catholic Church
- Diocese: Andria
- See: Andria
- Appointed: 2 February 1940
- Installed: 5 May 1940
- Term ended: 2 January 1952
- Predecessor: Paolo Rostagno
- Successor: Luigi Pirelli

Orders
- Ordination: 18 May 1924 by Basilio Pompili
- Consecration: 31 March 1940 by Carlo Rossi

Personal details
- Born: Giuseppe Di Donna; 23 August 1901 Rutigliano, Bari, Kingdom of Italy
- Died: 2 January 1952 (aged 50) Andria, Bari, Italy
- Education: Pontifical Gregorian University
- Motto: Gloria tibi Trinitas ed captivis libertas

Sainthood
- Venerated in: Roman Catholic Church
- Title as Saint: Venerable
- Attributes: Episcopal attire; Trinitarian habit

Giuseppe Di Donna (23 August 1901 – 2 January 1952) - in religious Giuseppe della Vergine - was an Italian Roman Catholic prelate and professed member from the Trinitarian Order who served as the Bishop of Andria from 1940 until his death. Di Donna entered the Trinitarian ranks in his late childhood and studied for the priesthood in Rome while later working for over a decade in the missions in Madagascar for evangelization purposes. But in 1940 he was summoned back to his homeland when news broke that Pope Pius XII appointed him as a bishop. Di Donna carried out his duties with meticulous care to ensure the growth of his flock; he promoted the Azione Cattolica movement and advised his priests to hold frequent lessons in catechesis for people so as to have a better understanding of the faith.

Di Donna died in 1952 due to a disease and had been revered as a saint both in and after his life. The beatification process opened soon after in his old diocese and he was titled as a Servant of God; he became titled as Venerable in 2008 after Pope Benedict XVI confirmed that he had lived a model life of heroic virtue.

== Life ==
Giuseppe Di Donna was born on 23 August 1901 in Rutigliano in Bari as the last of nine children to Domenico Di Donna (d. 07.02.1921) and Laura Santa Di Carlo (b. 1857). His mother had complications while pregnant with him and upon his baptism in the local parish consecrated him to the Blessed Mother to place him under her protection.

In 1911 - in the Lenten season - he came into contact with a Trinitarian and desired from that point on to follow in his footsteps to become a Trinitarian himself. He became enthralled with the Trinitarian's habit and his red and blue cross. His older priest brother Giovanni Battista helped him to enter the Trinitarian-run Santa Lucia school in Palestrina in Rome. His father had opposed another of his sons becoming a priest but later relented. Di Donna entered the school on 12 October 1912 and later was sent to do his novitiate in Livorno to the San Ferdinando convent in 1916 where he assumed the name "Giuseppe della Vergine" upon being vested in the habit for the first time on 12 October 1916. He did his ecclesial studies in Rome from 1918 at the San Crisogono di Trastevere college and at the Pontifical Gregorian under the Jesuit priests. He received the sacrament of Confirmation in Palestrina on 27 August 1914 from Cardinal Vincenzo Vannutelli.

In 1914 he received his ordination to the priesthood from Cardinal Basilio Pompili in the San Crisogono basilica before celebrating his first Mass in that same basilica. He obtained his degree in philosophical studies on 7 July 1920 and a dogmatic theological studies degree in July 1924. Di Donna's father died in 1921 but he was unable to attend the funeral because the order's provisions did not allow for it. On 23 December 1923 he made his solemn profession into the order. In 1925 permission was granted to the Trinitarians to be able to send some of their own members to the missions. Di Donna decided to leave alongside four confreres in June 1926 for the missions at Miarinarivo in Madagascar for the purposes of evangelization. The group met Pope Pius XI in a private audience before a farewell Mass for them held in the San Tommaso in Formis church on 4 June. On 21 June the group left from Marseille in France for the mission. Di Donna arrived at his mission on the evening of September 17. He was noted for his good humor and for his tireless apostolate despite governmental hostilities towards the missionaries and rampant diseases such as the bubonic plague. Di Donna made a brief return to Rome in November 1938 and another that saw him arrive in Rome on 25 November 1939. He left from there to France in order to return to the mission via boat but learnt on 8 December that he had been nominated as the Bishop of Andria and so returned to Rome. He failed four times to refuse the nomination.

Di Donna received his episcopal consecration on 31 March 1940 in the San Crisogono basilica in Rome from Cardinal Carlo Rossi (now a Servant of God) with Celso Benigno Luigi Costantini (now a Servant of God) and Francesco Petronelli serving as the co-consecrators. He was enthroned in his new episcopal see over a month after his consecration and began his apostolate. His installation came in the midst of pouring rain but the first thing he did upon getting out of the car before the Mass was to kiss the land; this action led to spontaneous applause from the faithful. He donated his goods to the poor and ill and recommended that his priests give frequent catechism lessons to the faithful so as to ensure people grew in their understanding of the faith. He also promoted the Azione Cattolica movement. On 15 July 1940 he consecrated his diocese to the Sacred Heart of Jesus due to the outbreak of World War I and the announcement that Benito Mussolini had pledged the Italian kingdom's involvement in the war on the side of the Axis powers.

In late August 1951 he was en route home to his diocese from a pilgrimage in Lourdes when a sudden illness overcame him. In Bari he was later diagnosed with pulmonary neoplasia with metastasis to the vertebral column. His condition grew so grave that on 15 December he received the last sacraments in anticipation of his death even though he struggled on for a little while longer. Di Donna died on 2 January 1952 at 2:28pm due to his disease with Father Stefano Savanelli at his side; the funeral was celebrated on 5 January.

== Beatification process ==
The beatification process was launched in his old diocese in an informative process that was inaugurated on 30 November 1956 and was closed a decade later on 4 July 1966; the contents of the overall investigation was then sent to the Congregation for Rites in Rome for evaluation. But the cause remained dormant until 18 October 1991 when the Congregation for the Causes of Saints validated the informative process and in 1993 received the Positio from the postulation for additional research and assessment. Theologians advising the C.C.S. did not meet to discuss and approve the dossier until over a decade after on 7 November 2006 with the C.C.S. also confirming the cause on 15 April 2008. Di Donna was later proclaimed as Venerable on 3 July 2008 after Pope Benedict XVI confirmed that the late bishop had lived a model life of heroic virtue.

The current postulator for this cause is the Trinitarian priest Javier Carnerero Peñalver.
