= Irsina =

Irsina Montepelòse or Mondepelòse
- Comune
- Comune di Irsina
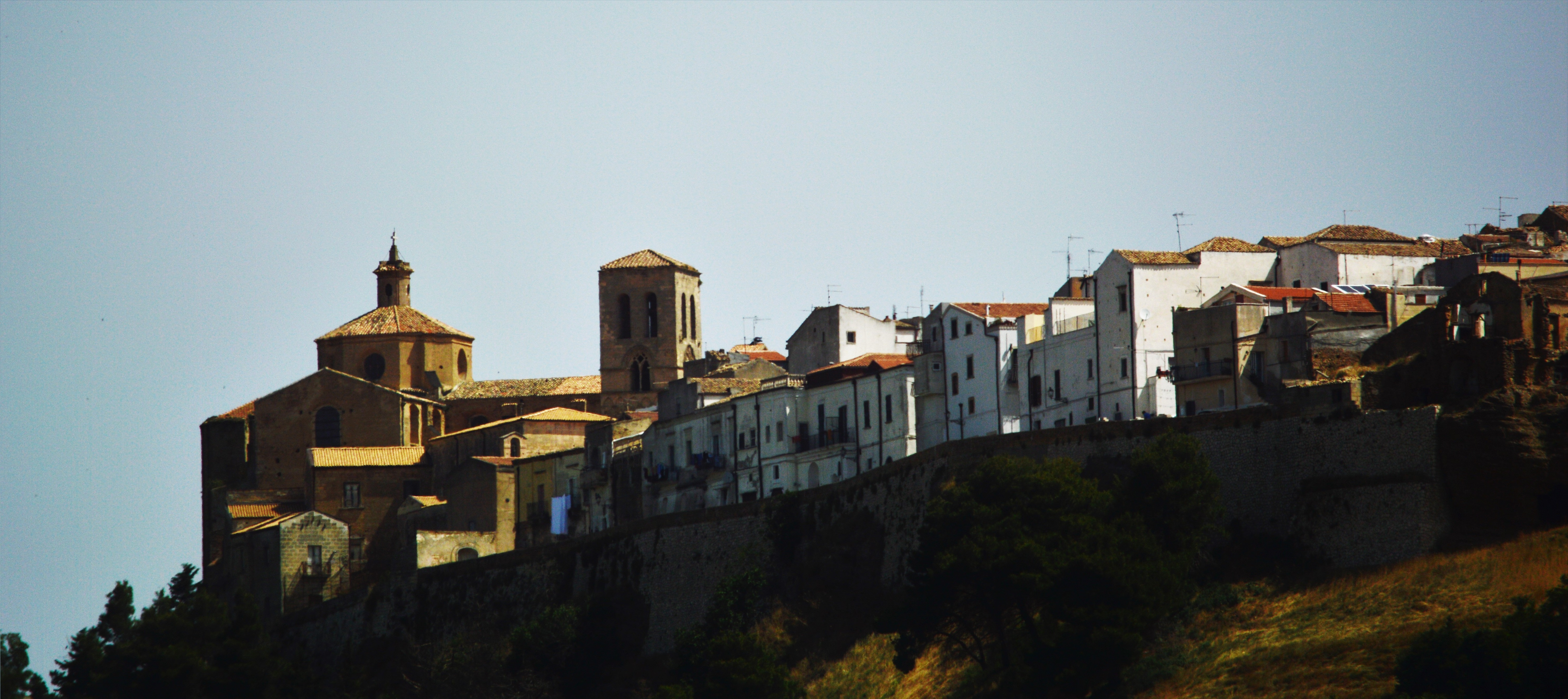

- Coat of arms

- Location within Italy Location within Basilicata
- Coordinates: 40°45′N 16°14′E
- Country: Italy
- Region: Basilicata
- Province: Matera (MT)
- Frazioni: Borgo Taccone Santa Maria d'Irsi

Government
  - Mayor: Nicola Massimo Morea

Area
  - Total: 263.47 km^{2} (101.73 sq mi)
- Elevation: 548 m (1,798 ft)

Population (31 May 2015)
  - Total: 4,965
  - Density: 18.84/km^{2} (48.81/sq mi)
- Demonym: Irsinesi
- Time zone: UTC+1 (CET)
  - Summer (DST): UTC+2 (CEST)
- Postal code: 75022
- Dialing code: 0835
- ISTAT code: 077013
- Patron saint: Saint Euphemia
- Saint day: 16 September
- Website: Official website

Irsina, until 1895 called Montepeloso (in local dialect: Montepelòse or Mondepelòse), is a town, comune (municipality) and former Latin bishopric in the province of Matera, in the Southern Italian region of Basilicata. It is one of I Borghi più belli d'Italia ("The most beautiful villages of Italy").

== The town ==
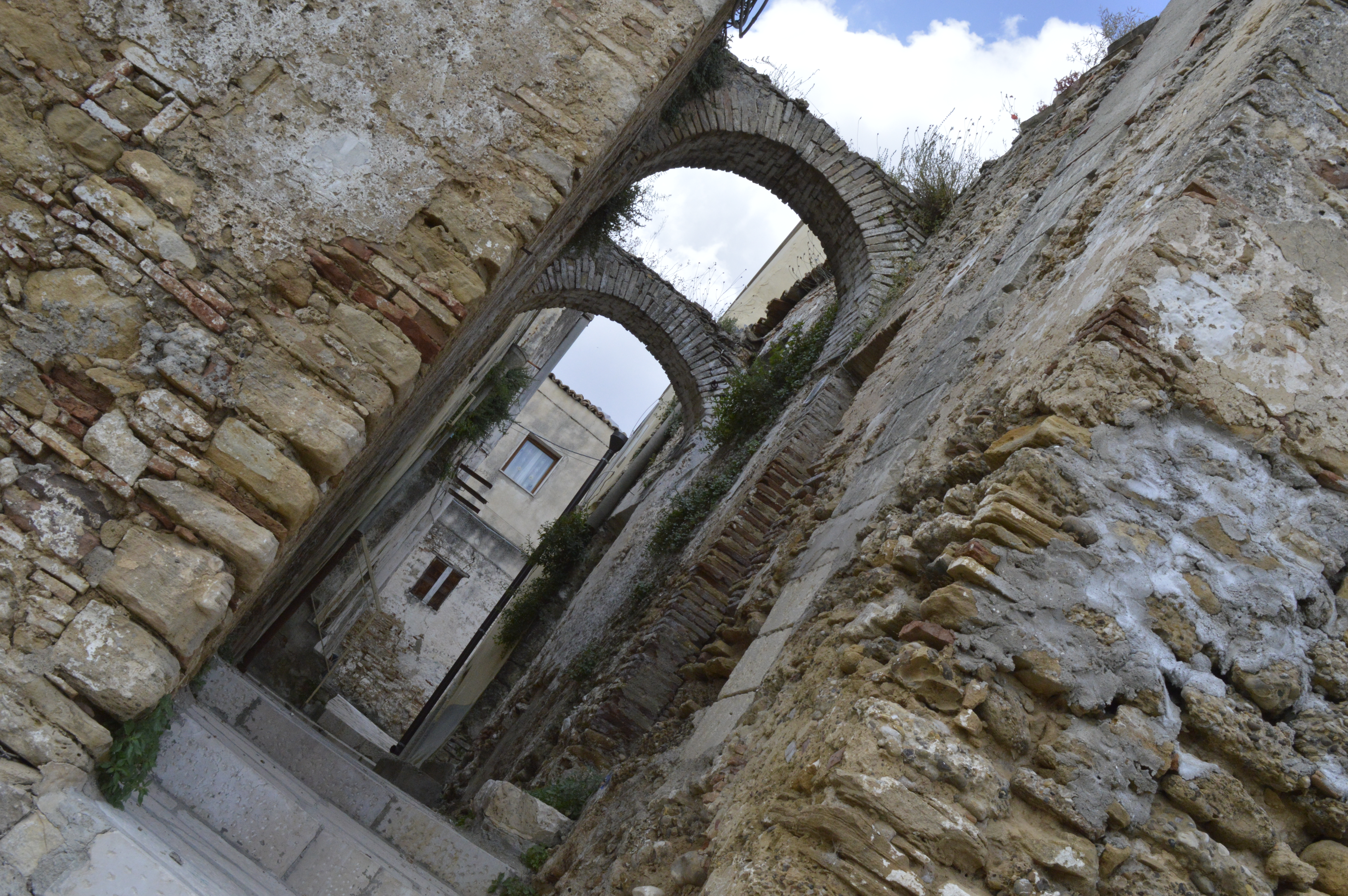
View of Irsina's old town

Irsina is an agricultural town perched 550 metres (1,800 ft) above sea level. The town overlooks a grain plateau which produces much of the pasta used across Italy. The economy is mostly based on agriculture, with the production of cereals and wine.

With a population of about 5,000 people in 2,000 households, Irsina sits on the border between the Southern Italian regions of Puglia (Apulia) and Basilicata, within the Council of Materia.

The geography of the town is very simple. The new town is joined to the old by a modern main street which has now become the commercial focus, with small bars, shops and cafes, surrounded by much housing.

Ancient walls embrace the historical centre. Entering through the town gates, there is a medieval part of Irsina with a labyrinth of cobblestone roads winding and opening up into little squares with scenic views over the vast countryside. Ancient watchtowers, small churches, elegant buildings and small fountains are familiar landmarks. There is a 13th-century cathedral which was partly rebuilt at the end of the 18th century. The remains of a Norman castle have since been incorporated into the crypt of the former monastery of San Francesco.

== Etymology ==
Until 1895, the town was called Montepoloso, a name derived from the Greek 'plusos', that means 'the land fertile and rich'.

The current name, Irsina, seems to derive from the Latin 'irtium'.

== History ==
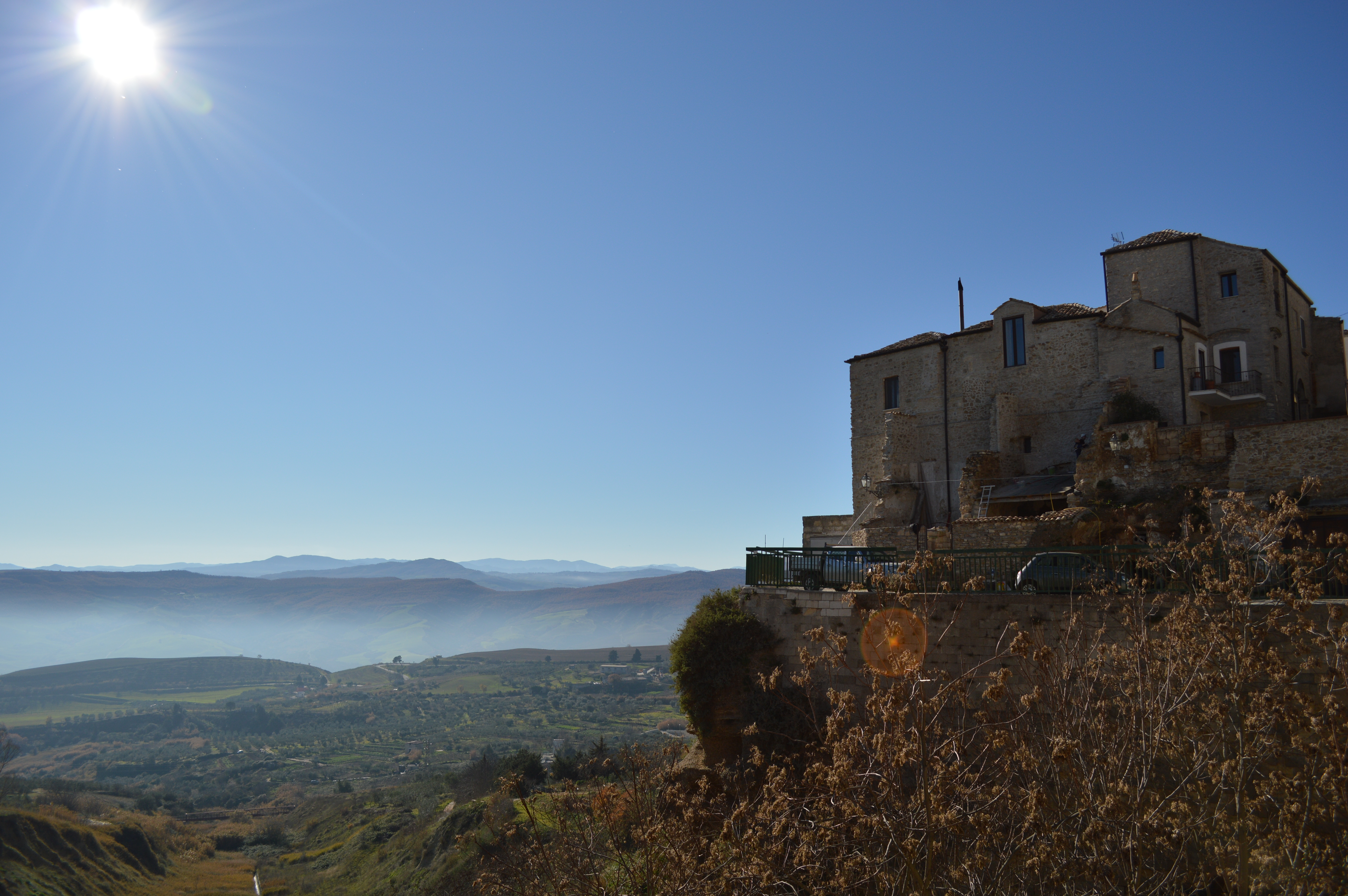
Glimpse of the old town overlooking the valley

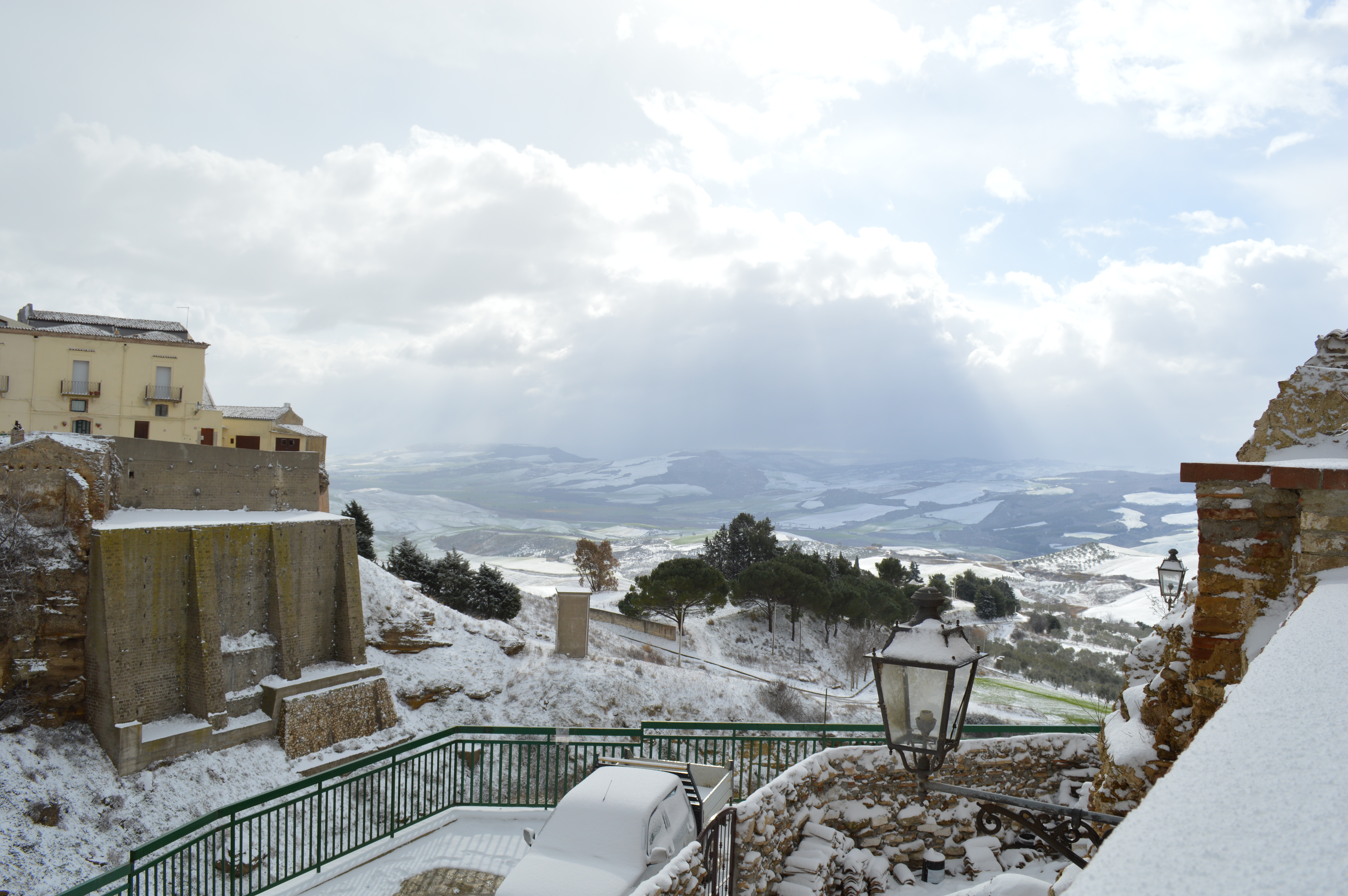
Irsina's winter panorama

The numerous archaeological finds, vases, Greek and Roman coins, weapons, furnishings, and various Italo-Greek relics, that have been found inside and outside Irsina, testify to its ancient grandeur during the Greek-Roman period.

The medieval history of Montepeloso starts from AD 895, the year in which the city was invaded by the Saracens. They were attempting to invade the southerly regions of Benevento (north-east of Napoli). They occupied many settlements in this region, which was at that time called Lucania. In 988 Montepeloso was besieged and again destroyed by the Saracens. Rebuilt by the Prince of Salerno Giovanni II, after his death (in about 998), it became the scene of bloody battles between the Muslims and the Byzantines.

In 1042, Montepeloso was the scene of a great battle between the Byzantine and the Norman armies. The Byzantine army was headed by Augustus Bugiano (Boioannes); the Norman forces are controlled by Atenolfo, brother of the Prince of Benevento. The knights are led by William of Altavilla and Argiro. The Byzantines are defeated by the Norman troops following which the town passed into Norman rule. According to the chronicle of the Beloved of Montecassino, Tristan, knight of the lineage Altavilla in the territory of the Vulture, is the first Norman Count of Montepeloso, one of the twelve baronies of which composes the County of Puglia.

In 1123, Pope Callisto II elected Montepeloso as a bishopric, perhaps to counter the presence of a strong Orthodox-Byzantine minority that still existed in the country. In 1132, Montepeloso joined the revolt of the Apulian Barons against Ruggero II, King of Sicily and Puglia, and was occupied by one of these Barons, Tancredi di Conversano, Count of Brindisi. A year later, Ruggero II punished the town for taking the side of the rebel Tancredi and it was razed to the ground and the inhabitants murdered.

There were various bloody dynastic events affecting the town in the Swabian period (11th to 14th centuries) when it was annexed to the County of Andria. With the death of Frederick II, it became a marquisate under the Lordship of Manfredi, whose defeat in the battle of Benevento in 1266 marked the passage of Montepeloso to the Angevins who first gave it to Pietro di Belmonte, (Count of Montescaglioso), and then to Giovanni di Monteforte, (Count of Squillace). In 1307, the town and the County of Montescaglioso passed to Bertrando del Balzo, Count of Avellino, who, following his marriage to Beatrice, daughter of Charles II, also obtained the County of Andria. The Aragonese took over from the Del Balzo family, who owned the lands of Montepeloso for over a century and a half. In 1586, Luigi Gaetani D’Aragona sold the barony of Montepeloso to Girolamo Grimaldi, a noble Genoese family.

In 1664, Niccolò Grimaldi, grandson of Girolamo, died leaving many debts. To pay off the fiefdom, Montepeloso was put up for auction. The town was awarded to Mr. Tommaso di Guevara, who later sold it to Girolamo Riario, (Marquis of Corleto). The Riario Sforza family were the last feudal lords of Montepeloso.

Napoleon conquered most of Italy in the name of the French Revolution by 1799. In the same year, the town joined the republican uprisings. In February of that same year the tree of freedom was planted in the square of San Salvatore, but soon, Cardinal Ruffo's Sanfedist troops extinguished any hope of change. The arrival of the French in 1806 marked the end of feudalism. In the post-unification period, Montepeloso was also affected by bandits. Some gangs led by such Ingiongiolo and D'Eufemia often operated in the town.

By 2023 non-Italians were moving to Irsina.

=== Change of name to Irsina ===
A final date marked the history of the town, 6 February 1895, with a resolution of the City Council, the ancient name of Montepeloso was changed to Irsina.

== Modern town ==
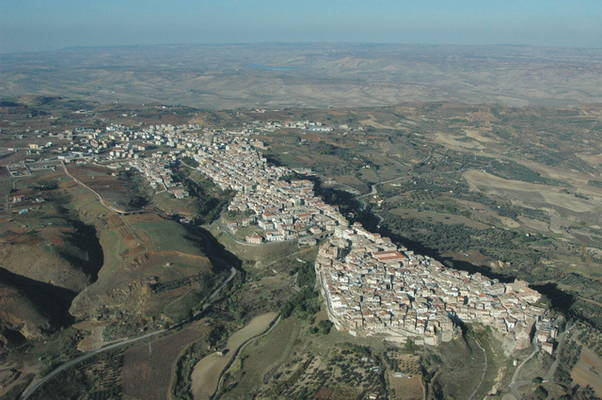
Irsina fly view

Irsina has a community of residents from across the world – including the USA, Britain, Ireland, South Africa and Belgium – who live there either full-time or have holiday homes. The village hosts annual Italian language courses, art events, and an international film festival.

The Aranacea cultural hub is owned publicly by the municipality. Irsina is just coming onto the tourist radar.

The village is one hour from Bari Airport (Ryanair), and an hour and a half from Brindisi airport (also Ryanair). It is one hour from the beach, and thirty minutes from Matera. The countryside is interspersed with rivers, lakes, fields, woods and archaeological ruins.

== Climate ==
Irsina is the southernmost city in Europe (around 40° N) with an oceanic climate (Köppen: Cfb) although it is close to cities with more Mediterranean characteristics like Potenza.

== Festivals ==
=== Festival of Piety, Pizzicanto (last weekend in May) ===
The old festival of Piety is celebrated in the centre of Irsina on the last Sunday of May. In the past, the procession started from the small church of the Madonna della Pietà, near the allotments just outside the town, and ended at the cathedral. The game pizzicanto is still played where two teams of young locals form a human pyramid and move along the streets in circular movements, enlivening the followers with a traditional song sung in local dialect. Those on top sing: 'You underneath, be careful not to drop us. If you make us fall we'll give you a good beating'. Those below respond: 'You on top, hold yourselves up properly. If you fall, we'll give you a good beating'. The game repeats itself when the team loses balance and the pyramid collapses. In the past, the trade of the participants, farmers, bricklayers etc. divided teams. This tradition also exists in parts of Spain.

=== Festival of Saint Roch (15–17 August) ===
The festival of Saint Roch (Sand’Rocc) is unique to Irsina. Every year on 15 August (a national holiday known as 'Ferragosto'), women in the old town of Irsina prepare small altars in their basements, garages and cellars, in honour of the Saint from Montpellier, to be visited from the evening of the 15th until dawn of 17 August.

For two nights locals stay awake, singing nursery rhymes, in dialect, that recount of the life and miracles of Saint Roch. To the sound of the accordion, traditional dances such as the tarantella, mazurka and quadriglia are alternated, with the occasional modern dance. Spectators can admire the spotless sheets and finely embroidered tablecloths that would have been completed by the old women in their youth, and are used just for this occasion. On the altar, images and small statues of the Saint are positioned, whilst the rooms are decorated with plants, typical handicrafts and perfumed with basil herbs.

During the vigil for Saint Roch on the night of 15 August, in between the dancing and singing, i pettl, or savoury doughnuts are fried in the garages and cellars alongside the revelers. There is also a prize, a lamb, for the best decorated altar.

=== Festival of Saint Eufemia, (14 – 17 September) ===
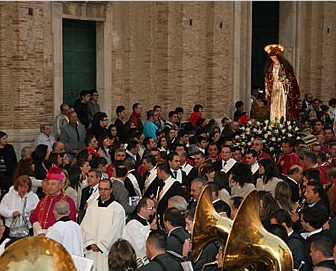
San'Eufemia statue in procession

The festival of Saint Eufemia is the oldest and most poignant tradition of Irsina. It is an annual event from 14 to 17 September with the most important day being the 16th, when a procession of representatives from the civil and military authorities, together with the Festival Committee, enter the cathedral and deliver the keys of the town to the bishop.

A long street procession then takes place where faithful followers of Saint Eufemia carry an image of the Saint, the relic of her arm and the icon of Saint Mary of the Divine Providence (Maria S.S. Madre della Divina Provvidenza) to the streets of Irsina. The celebrations continue with fireworks displays, brass band concerts and marches, street lighting and on the last day, a pop concert.

=== Gio: Maria Trabaci Festival ===
In 2025, the first edition of Giovanni Maria Trabaci Festival, celebrating the life and work of the composer born in the town around 1580, took place, with lectures and early music concerts by the harpist Mara Galassi and harpsichordist Aleksander Mocek, as well as workshops in painting.

== Main sights ==
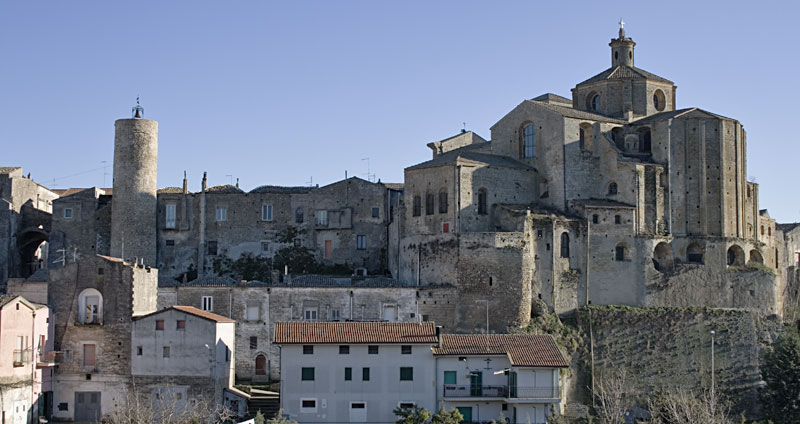
Irsina Cathedral

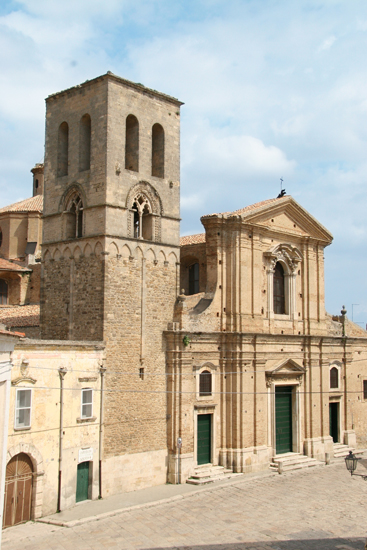
Front of Cathedral

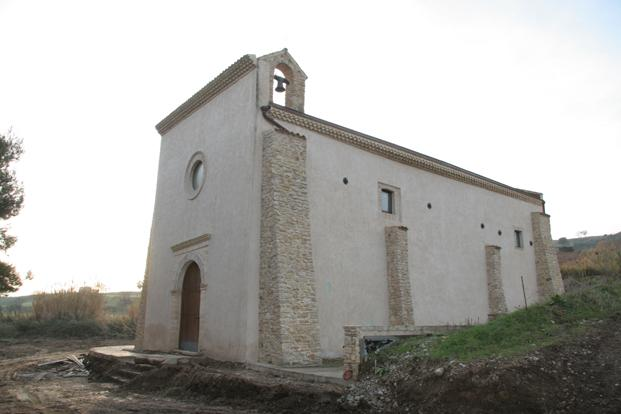
Church of "Madonna della Pietà"

- Irsina Cathedral (Cattedrale di Santa Maria Assunta) was built in the 13th century and rebuilt in 1777. It has a Baroque façade and a Gothic bell tower with mullioned windows. The interior houses a red marble baptismal font, and a marble statue of Saint Euphemia, the town's patron saint (claimed as the only known sculpture by Andrea Mantegna) and several canvasses of the 18th century Neapolitan school.
- Church of the friary of St. Francis (former castle of Frederick II). Dating to the 12th century, it was rebuilt in the 16th century. The crypt has 14th-century frescoes of the Umbrian-Sienese school portraying the Redeemer, the Incoronation, the Annunciation, the Crucifixion and the Resurrection.
- Church of Maria S.S. del Carmine, housing a 17th-century painting of the Marriage at Cana.
- Church of the Madonna della Pieta (1703). It is located opposite the western side of the walls of the ancient Montepeloso, in an affected area since the eleventh century by the Benedictine monastery of St. Mary of Juso .

== Notable residents ==
- Giovanni Maria Trabaci (ca. 1575–1647), composer
- Andrea Miglionico (1662–1711), painter
- Johnny Torrio (1882–1957), mobster
- Tommaso Morlino (1925–1983), politician
- Giuseppe Mascolo (1927–1974), composer
- Angelo Ziccardi (1928–2019), politician
- Angelo Raffaele Dinardo (1932–2015), politician
- Giuseppe Rocco Favale (1935–2018), bishop

== Twin towns ==
- Sassuolo, Italy
- Sant'Angelo del Pesco, Italy
