= Domenico de' Marini (died 1676) =

Most Reverend Domenico de' Marini
- Titular Archbishop of Teodosia
- Church: Catholic Church
- In office: 1669–1676
- Predecessor: Adrian Grodecki
- Successor: Francesco de' Marini

Orders
- Consecration: 18 May 1670 by Pietro Vidoni

Personal details
- Died: 27 April 1676

Domenico de' Marini (died 27 April 1676) was a Roman Catholic prelate who served as Titular Archbishop of Teodosia (1669–1676).

== Biography ==
On 2 December 1669, he was appointed during the papacy of Pope Clement IX as Titular Archbishop of Teodosia. On 18 May 1670, he was consecrated bishop by Pietro Vidoni, Cardinal-Priest of San Callisto, with Federico Baldeschi Colonna, Titular Archbishop of Caesarea in Cappadocia, and Francesco Maria Febei, Titular Archbishop of Tarsus, serving as co-consecrators. He served as Titular Archbishop of Teodosia until his death on 27 April 1676.

== Episcopal succession ==
While bishop, he was the principal co-consecrator of:

- Pietro Isimbardi, Bishop of Cremona (1670);
- Carlo Loffredo, Bishop of Molfetta (1670); and
- Francesco Arrigua, Bishop of Nicotera (1670).

== External links and additional sources ==
- Cheney, David M. "Teodosia (Titular See)". Catholic-Hierarchy.org. (for Chronology of Bishops) ^{[self-published]}
- Chow, Gabriel. "Titular Episcopal See of Theodosiopolis in Arcadia (Egypt)". GCatholic.org. (for Chronology of Bishops) ^{[self-published]}

Catholic Church titles
Preceded by Adrian Grodecki	Titular Archbishop of Teodosia; 1669–1676	Succeeded by Francesco de' Marini
