= Carlo Loffredo =

Italian Catholic prelate (1635–1701)

Most Reverend Carlo Loffredo
- Archbishop of Capua
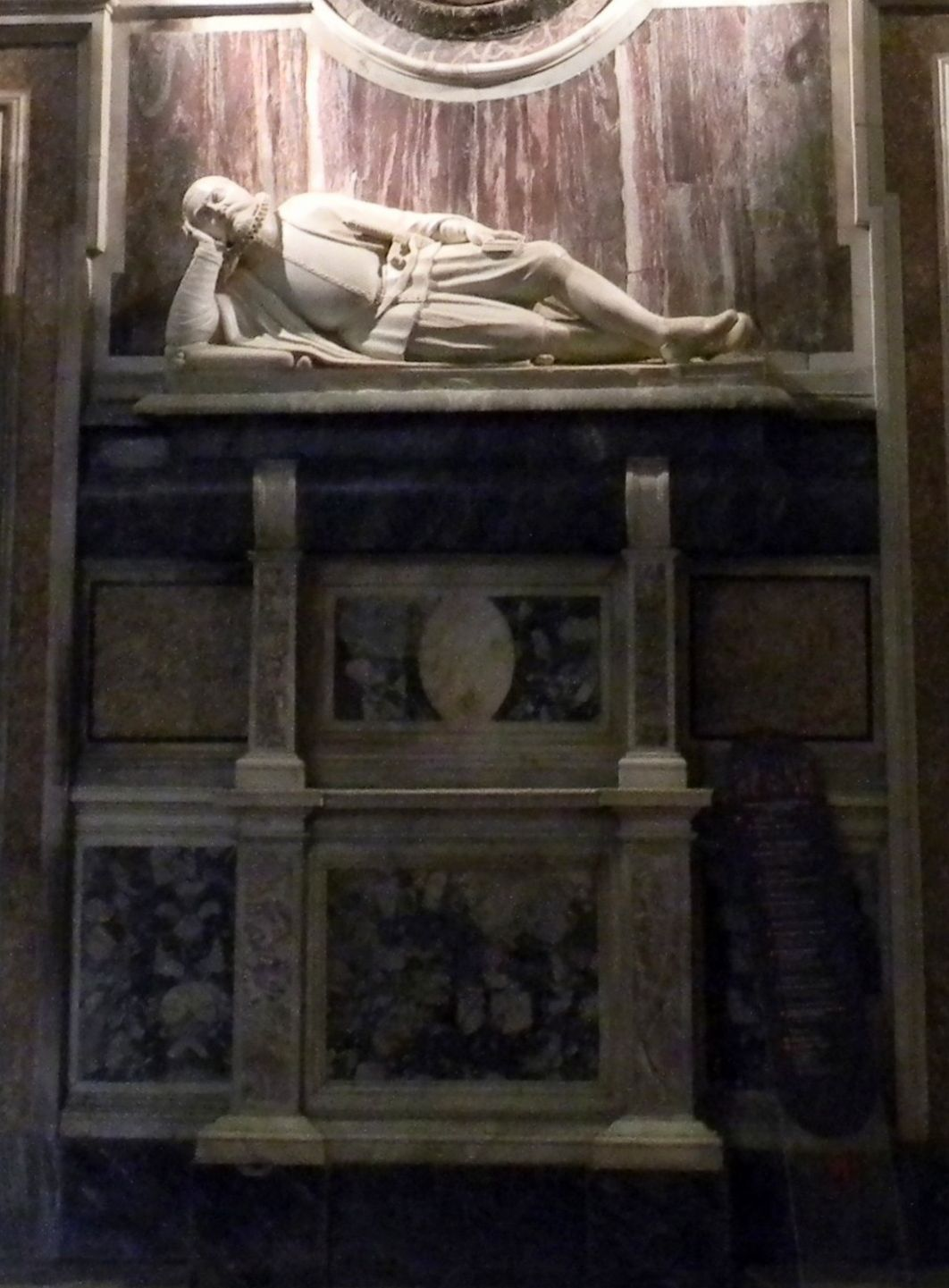
- Church: Catholic Church
- Archdiocese: Archdiocese of Capua
- In office: 1698–1701
- Predecessor: Giuseppe Bologna
- Successor: Niccolò Caracciolo
- Previous posts: Bishop of Molfetta (1670–1691); Archbishop of Bari-Canosa (1691–1698)

Orders
- Consecration: 19 October 1670 by Benedetto Odescalchi

Personal details
- Born: 31 March 1635 Cardito, Italy
- Died: January 1701 (age 65) Capua, Italy

Carlo Loffredo, C.R. (31 March 1635 – January 1701) was a Roman Catholic prelate who served as Archbishop of Capua (1698–1701), Archbishop of Bari-Canosa (1691–1698), and Bishop of Molfetta (1670–1691).

== Biography ==
Carlo Loffredo was born in Cardito, Italy on 31 March 1635 and ordained a priest in the Congregation of Clerics Regular of the Divine Providence. On 6 October 1670, he was appointed during the papacy of Pope Clement X as Bishop of Molfetta. On 19 October 1670, he was consecrated bishop by Benedetto Odescalchi, Cardinal-Priest of Sant'Onofrio, with Domenico de' Marini, Titular Archbishop of Teodosia, and Tommaso d'Aquino, Bishop of Sessa Aurunca, serving as co-consecrators. On 26 November 1691, he was appointed during the papacy of Pope Innocent XII as Archbishop of Bari-Canosa. On 10 March 1698, he was appointed during the papacy of Pope Clement XI as Archbishop of Capua. He served as Archbishop of Capua until his death in January 1701.

== Episcopal succession ==
While bishop, he was the principal co-consecrator of:

- Francesco Fortezza, Bishop of Siracusa (1676);
- Lorenzo Buti (Laurent Buti), Bishop of Carpentras (1691);
- Domenico Belisario de Bellis, Bishop of Molfetta (1696);
- Maioranus Figlioli, Bishop of Caiazzo (1696);
- Giuseppe Schinosi, Bishop of Caserta (1696);
- Francesco della Marra, Bishop of Mottola (1696);
- Giacinto Camillo Maradei, Bishop of Policastro (1696);
- Vincenzo Maria de Rossi, Bishop of Penne e Atri (1696);
- Andrea Ariani, Bishop of Andria (1697);
- Juan Lorenzo Ibáñez de Arilla, Bishop of Tropea (1697);
- Francesco Antonio Volturale, Bishop of Vieste (1697);
- Bernabé de Castro, Archbishop of Lanciano (1697);
- Innico Caracciolo, Bishop of Aversa (1697);
- Michele Maria Dentice, Bishop of Mottola (1697);
- Filippo de Cordova, Bishop of Guardialfiera (1697);
- Giuseppe Rottario, Bishop of Alba (1697); and
- Bonaventura Poerio, Archbishop of Salerno (1697).

== External links and additional sources ==
- Cheney, David M. "Diocese of Molfetta-Ruvo-Giovinazzo-Terlizzi". Catholic-Hierarchy.org. (for Chronology of Bishops) ^{[self-published]}
- Chow, Gabriel. "Diocese of Molfetta-Ruvo-Giovinazzo-Terlizzi (Italy)". GCatholic.org. (for Chronology of Bishops) ^{[self-published]}
- Cheney, David M. "Archdiocese of Bari-Bitonto". Catholic-Hierarchy.org. (for Chronology of Bishops) ^{[self-published]}
- Chow, Gabriel. "Metropolitan Archdiocese of Bari–Bitonto (Italy)". GCatholic.org. (for Chronology of Bishops) ^{[self-published]}
- Cheney, David M. "Archdiocese of Capua". Catholic-Hierarchy.org. (for Chronology of Bishops) ^{[self-published]}
- Chow, Gabriel. "Archdiocese of Capua (Italy)". GCatholic.org. (for Chronology of Bishops) ^{[self-published]}

Catholic Church titles
Preceded by Francesco de' Marini	Bishop of Molfetta; 1670–1691	Succeeded by Pietro Vecchia (bishop)
Preceded by Tommaso Maria Ruffo	Archbishop of Bari-Canosa; 1691–1698	Succeeded by Muzio Gaeta
Preceded by Giuseppe Bologna	Archbishop of Capua; 1698–1701	Succeeded by Niccolò Caracciolo
