= Tommaso d'Aquino (bishop of Sessa Aurunca) =

17th and 18th-century Italian Catholic bishop

Most Reverend Tommaso d'Aquino
- Bishop of Sessa Aurunca
- Church: Catholic Church
- Diocese: Diocese of Sessa Aurunca
- In office: 1670–1705
- Predecessor: Ulysses Gherardini della Rosa
- Successor: Raffaele Maria Filamondo

Orders
- Consecration: 20 July 1670 by Francesco Barberini

Personal details
- Born: 1635 Somma, Italy
- Died: 26 September 1705 (age 70) Sessa Aurunca, Italy

Tommaso d'Aquino, C.R. (1635 – 26 September 1705) was a Roman Catholic prelate who served as Bishop of Sessa Aurunca (1670–1705).

== Biography ==
Tommaso d'Aquino was born in Somma, Italy in 1635 and ordained a priest in the Congregation of Clerics Regular of the Divine Providence. On 30 June 1670, he was appointed during the papacy of Pope Clement X as Bishop of Sessa Aurunca. On 20 July 1670, he was consecrated bishop by Francesco Barberini, Cardinal-Bishop of Ostia e Velletri. He served as Bishop of Sessa Aurunca until his death on 26 September 1705.

== Episcopal succession ==
While bishop, d'Aquino was the principal co-consecrator of:

- Pietro Isimbardi, Bishop of Cremona (1670);
- Carlo Loffredo, Bishop of Molfetta (1670); and
- Francesco Arrigua, Bishop of Nicotera (1670).

Catholic Church titles
Preceded by Ulysses Gherardini della Rosa	Bishop of Sessa Aurunca; 1670–1705)	Succeeded by Raffaele Maria Filamondo
