= Pietro Vecchia =

Pietro Vecchia may refer to:

- Pietro della Vecchia (1603–1678), Italian painter
- Pietro Vecchia (bishop) (1628–1695), Roman Catholic prelate
