= Tommaso de Franchi =

Most Reverend Tommaso de Franchi
- Bishop of Melfi e Rapolla
- Church: Catholic Church
- Diocese: Diocese of Melfi e Rapolla
- In office: 1671–1696
- Predecessor: Giulio Caracciolo
- Successor: Francesco Antonio Triveri

Orders
- Consecration: 6 September 1671 by Federico Borromeo (iuniore)

Personal details
- Born: 1626 Genoa, Italy
- Died: May 1696 (age 70)

Tommaso de Franchi (1626–1696) was a Roman Catholic prelate who served as Bishop of Melfi e Rapolla (1671–1696).

== Biography ==
Tommaso de Franchi was born in Genoa, Italy in 1626. On 24 August 1671, he was appointed during the papacy of Pope Clement X as Bishop of Melfi e Rapolla. On 6 September 1671, he was consecrated bishop by Federico Borromeo (iuniore), Cardinal-Priest of Sant'Agostino, with Giacomo Altoviti, Titular Patriarch of Antioch, and Giacomo de Angelis, Archbishop Emeritus of Urbino, serving as co-consecrators. He served as Bishop of Melfi e Rapolla until his death in May 1696.

While bishop, he was the principal co-consecrator of Marcos de Ostos, Archbishop of Salerno (1692); and Teofilo Testa, Bishop of Tropea (1692).

== External links and additional sources ==
- Cheney, David M. "Diocese of Melfi-Rapolla-Venosa". Catholic-Hierarchy.org. (for Chronology of Bishops) ^{[self-published]}
- Chow, Gabriel. "Diocese of Melfi-Rapolla-Venosa (Italy)". GCatholic.org. (for Chronology of Bishops) ^{[self-published]}

Catholic Church titles
Preceded by Giulio Caracciolo	Bishop of Melfi e Rapolla; 1671–1696	Succeeded by Francesco Antonio Triveri
