= Teofilo Testa =

Most Reverend Teofilo Testa
- Bishop of Tropea
- Church: Catholic Church
- Diocese: Diocese of Tropea
- In office: 1692–1695
- Predecessor: Francisco de Figueroa (bishop)
- Successor: Juan Lorenzo Ibáñez de Arilla

Orders
- Consecration: 18 December 1655 by Ferdinando d'Adda

Personal details
- Born: 12 September 1631 S. Pauli, Italy
- Died: 21 October 1695 (aged 64) Tropea, Italy

Teofilo Testa, O.F.M. Obs. (1631–1695) was a Roman Catholic prelate who served as Bishop of Tropea (1692–1695).

== Biography ==
Teofilo Testa was born in S. Pauli, Italy on 12 September 1631 and ordained a priest in the Order of Observant Friars Minor. On 25 June 1692, he was appointed during the papacy of Pope Innocent XII as Bishop of Tropea. On 18 December 1655, he was consecrated bishop by Ferdinando d'Adda, Cardinal-Priest of San Clemente, with Tommaso de Franchi, Bishop of Melfi e Rapolla, and Francesco Antonio Triveri, Bishop of Andria, serving as co-consecrators. He served as Bishop of Tropea until his death on 21 October 1695.

== External links and additional sources ==
- Cheney, David M. "Diocese of Tropea". Catholic-Hierarchy.org. (for Chronology of Bishops) ^{[self-published]}
- Chow, Gabriel. "Diocese of Tropea (Italy)". GCatholic.org. (for Chronology of Bishops) ^{[self-published]}

Catholic Church titles
Preceded by Francisco de Figueroa (bishop)	Bishop of Tropea; 1692–1695	Succeeded by Juan Lorenzo Ibáñez de Arilla
