= Grodecki =

Grodecki (feminine: Grodecka; plural: Grodeccy) is a Polish surname. It may refer to:

- Adrian Grodecki, Polish bishop
- Louis Grodecki (1910–1982), French art historian
- Roman Grodecki (1889–1964), Polish economic historian
- Wiktor Grodecki (born 1960), Polish filmmaker
