= Cozzi =

Cozzi is an Italian surname. Notable people with the surname include:

- Gaetano Cozzi (1922–2001), Italian historian
- Ernesto Cozzi (1870–1926), Catholic missionary, diplomat, and ethnologist in Albania
- Julio Cozzi (1922–2011), Argentine footballer
- Luigi Cozzi (born 1947), Italian film director
- Paolo Cozzi (born 1980), Italian volleyball player
- Vincenzo Cozzi (1926–2013), Italian Roman Catholic bishop
