= Giulio Caracciolo =

Giulio Caracciolo may refer to

- Giulio Caracciolo (archbishop of Iconium) (born 1627), 17th century Italian Roman Catholic bishop
- Giulio Caracciolo (archbishop of Cassano all'Jonio) (died 1599), 16th Italian century Roman Catholic bishop
