= Francesco Antonio Triveri =

17th-century Italian Catholic bishop

Most Reverend Francesco Antonio Triveri
- Bishop of Melfi e Rapolla
- Church: Catholic Church
- Diocese: Diocese of Melfi e Rapolla
- In office: 1696–1697
- Predecessor: Tommaso de Franchi
- Successor: Antonio Spinelli

Orders
- Consecration: 27 January 1692 by Marcantonio Barbarigo

Personal details
- Born: 1631 Biella, Italy
- Died: May 1697 (age 66)

Francesco Antonio Triveri, O.F.M. Conv. (1631–1697) was a Roman Catholic prelate who served as Bishop of Melfi e Rapolla (1696–1697) and Bishop of Andria (1692–1696).

== Biography ==
Francesco Antonio Triveri was born in Biella, Italy and ordained a priest in the Order of Friars Minor Conventual. On 21 January 1692, he was appointed during the papacy of Pope Innocent XII as Bishop of Andria. On 27 January 1692, he was consecrated bishop by Marcantonio Barbarigo, Bishop of Corneto e Montefiascone, with Giovan Donato Giannoni Alitto, Bishop of Ruvo, and Pietro Vecchia (bishop), Bishop of Molfetta, with serving as co-consecrators. On 24 September 1696, he was appointed during the papacy of Pope Innocent XII as Bishop of Melfi e Rapolla. He served as Bishop of Melfi e Rapolla until his death in May 1697.

== Episcopal succession ==
While bishop, Triveri was the principal co-consecrator of:

- Marcos de Ostos, Archbishop of Salerno (1692); and
- Teofilo Testa, Bishop of Tropea (1692).

== External links and additional sources ==
- Cheney, David M. "Diocese of Andria". Catholic-Hierarchy.org. (for Chronology of Bishops) ^{[self-published]}
- Chow, Gabriel. "Diocese of Andria (Italy)". GCatholic.org. (for Chronology of Bishops) ^{[self-published]}
- Cheney, David M. "Diocese of Melfi-Rapolla-Venosa". Catholic-Hierarchy.org. (for Chronology of Bishops) ^{[self-published]}
- Chow, Gabriel. "Diocese of Melfi-Rapolla-Venosa (Italy)". GCatholic.org. (for Chronology of Bishops) ^{[self-published]}

Catholic Church titles
Preceded by Pietro Vecchia (bishop)	Bishop of Andria; 1692–1696	Succeeded by Andrea Ariani
Preceded by Tommaso de Franchi	Bishop of Melfi e Rapolla; 1696–1697	Succeeded by Antonio Spinelli
