= Francesco Arrigua =

Most Reverend Francesco Arrigua
- Bishop of Nicotera
- Church: Catholic Church
- Diocese: Diocese of Nicotera
- In office: 1670–1690
- Predecessor: Giovanni Francesco Biancolella
- Successor: Bartolomeo Riberi

Orders
- Consecration: 19 October 1670 by Benedetto Odescalchi

Personal details
- Born: 1615 Monforte, Italy
- Died: 12 November 1690 (aged 74–75) Nicotera, Italy

Francesco Arrigua O.M. (1615 – 12 November 1690) was a Roman Catholic prelate who served as Bishop of Nicotera (1670–1690).

== Biography ==
Francesco Arrigua was born in Monforte, Italy in 1615 and ordained a priest in the Order of the Minims. On 6 October 1670, he was appointed during the papacy of Pope Clement X as Bishop of Nicotera. On 19 October 1670, he was consecrated bishop by Benedetto Odescalchi, Cardinal-Priest of Sant'Onofrio, with Domenico de' Marini, Titular Archbishop of Teodosia, and Tommaso d'Aquino, Bishop of Sessa Aurunca, serving as co-consecrators. He served as Bishop of Nicotera until his death on 12 November 1690.

Catholic Church titles
Preceded by Giovanni Francesco Biancolella	Bishop of Nicotera; 1670–1690	Succeeded by Bartolomeo Riberi
