= Lodovico Centofiorini =

Most Reverend Lodovico Centofiorini
- Bishop of Nicotera
- Church: Catholic Church
- Diocese: Diocese of Nicotera
- In office: 1650–1651
- Predecessor: Camillo Baldi
- Successor: Ercole Coppola

Orders
- Consecration: 8 May 1650 by Tiberio Cenci

Personal details
- Died: 1651 Nicotera, Italy

Lodovico Centofiorini or Francesco Centofiorini (died 1651) was a Roman Catholic prelate who served as Bishop of Nicotera (1650–1651).

== Biography ==
On 2 May 1650, Lodovico Centofiorini was appointed during the papacy of Pope Innocent X as Bishop of Nicotera. On 8 May 1650, he was consecrated bishop by Tiberio Cenci, Bishop of Jesi, with Fabio Olivadisi, Bishop of Catanzaro, and Bartolomeo Vannini, Bishop of Nepi e Sutri, serving as co-consecrators. He served as Bishop of Nicotera until his death in 1651.

Catholic Church titles
Preceded by Camillo Baldi	Bishop of Nicotera; 1650–1651	Succeeded by Ercole Coppola
