= Francesco de' Marini =

Roman Catholic Prelate

Most Reverend Francesco de' Marini
- Titular Archbishop of Teodosia
- Church: Catholic Church
- In office: 1676–1700
- Predecessor: Domenico de' Marini
- Successor: Ulisse Giuseppe Gozzadini
- Previous posts: Titular Archbishop of Amasea (1671–1676); Bishop of Albenga (1655–1666); Bishop of Molfetta (1666–1670)

Orders
- Consecration: 8 August 1655 by Federico Sforza

Personal details
- Born: 1630 Genoa, Italy
- Died: 1700 (age 70)

Francesco de' Marini (1630–1700) was a Roman Catholic prelate who served as Titular Archbishop of Teodosia (1676–1700), Titular Archbishop of Amasea (1671–1676), Bishop of Molfetta (1666–1670), and Bishop of Albenga (1655–1666).

== Biography ==
Francesco de' Marini was born in Genoa, Italy in 1630. On 2 August 1655, he was appointed by Pope Alexander VII as Bishop of Albenga. On 8 August 1655, he was consecrated bishop by Federico Sforza, Cardinal-Deacon of Santi Vito, Modesto e Crescenzia, with Giacinto Cordella, Bishop of Venafro, and Louis de Fortia-Montréal, Bishop of Cavaillon, serving as co-consecrators. On 29 March 1666, he was appointed by Pope Alexander VII as Bishop of Molfetta where he served until his resignation on 6 Oct 1670. On 19 January 1671, he was appointed by Pope Clement X as Titular Archbishop of Amasea. On 27 April 1676, he was appointed by Pope Clement X as Titular Archbishop of Teodosia. He served as Titular Archbishop of Teodosia until his death in 1700.

== Episcopal succession ==
While bishop, he was the principal co-consecrator of:

- Gasparo Carpegna, Titular Archbishop of Nicaea (1670);
- Ippolito Vicentini, Bishop of Rieti (1671);
- Gerolamo Passarelli, Bishop of Isernia (1673);
- Domenico Tafuri, Bishop of Satriano e Campagna (1673);
- Ascanio Paganelli, Bishop of Montalto delle Marche (1673);
- Bartolomeo Menatti, Bishop of Lodi (1673);
- Fabio Guinigi, Archbishop of Ravenna (1674);
- Vincenzo Bonifacio, Titular Bishop of Famagusta (1674);
- Mario Emmanuelle Durazzo, Bishop of Aleria (1674);
- Matteo Orlandi, Bishop of Cefalù (1674);
- Agostino Isimbardi, Bishop of Cremona (1676);
- Girolamo Orsaja, Archbishop of Rossano (1676);
- Antonio Molinari (bishop), Bishop of Lettere-Gragnano (1676);
- Juan Tomás de Rocaberti, Archbishop of Valencia (1677);
- Giuseppe Nicola Gilberti, Bishop of Teano (1681);
- Ottavio Paravicino, Bishop of Mileto (1681);
- Lodovico Septala, Bishop of Cremona (1682);
- Giuseppe Felice Barlacci, Bishop of Narni (1683);
- Bernardin Marchese, Bishop of Sarsina (1683);
- Alberto Sebastiano Botti (Blotto), Bishop of Albenga (1689);
- Michelangelo Mattei, Titular Archbishop of Hadrianopolis in Haemimonto (1689);
- Lorenzo Corsini, Titular Archbishop of Nicomedia (1690);
- Giorgio Spinola, Bishop of Albenga (1691); and
- Ludovico Masdoni, Bishop of Modena (1691).

== External links and additional sources ==
- Cheney, David M. "Teodosia (Titular See)". Catholic-Hierarchy.org. (for Chronology of Bishops) ^{[self-published]}
- Chow, Gabriel. "Titular Episcopal See of Theodosiopolis in Arcadia (Egypt)". GCatholic.org. (for Chronology of Bishops) ^{[self-published]}
- Cheney, David M. "Amasea (Titular See)". Catholic-Hierarchy.org. (for Chronology of Bishops) ^{[self-published]}
- Chow, Gabriel. "Titular Metropolitan See of Amasea (Turkey)". GCatholic.org. (for Chronology of Bishops) ^{[self-published]}
- Cheney, David M. "Diocese of Albenga-Imperia". Catholic-Hierarchy.org. (for Chronology of Bishops) ^{[self-published]}
- Chow, Gabriel. "Diocese of Albenga-Imperia (Italy)". GCatholic.org. (for Chronology of Bishops) ^{[self-published]}
- Cheney, David M. "Diocese of Molfetta-Ruvo-Giovinazzo-Terlizzi". Catholic-Hierarchy.org. (for Chronology of Bishops) ^{[self-published]}
- Chow, Gabriel. "Diocese of Molfetta-Ruvo-Giovinazzo-Terlizzi (Italy)". GCatholic.org. (for Chronology of Bishops) ^{[self-published]}

Catholic Church titles
Preceded by Pietro Francesco Costa	Bishop of Albenga; 1655–1666	Succeeded by Giovanni Tommaso Pinelli
Preceded by Giovanni Tommaso Pinelli	Bishop of Molfetta; 1666–1670	Succeeded by Carlo Loffredo
Preceded by Egidio Colonna (patriarch)	Titular Archbishop of Amasea; 1671–1676	Succeeded by Ferdinando d'Adda
Preceded by Domenico de' Marini	Titular Archbishop of Teodosia; 1676–1700	Succeeded by Ulisse Giuseppe Gozzadini
