= Cosimo de Torres =

Italian Roman Catholic cardinal

His Eminence Cosimo de Torres
- Cardinal, Archbishop of Monreale
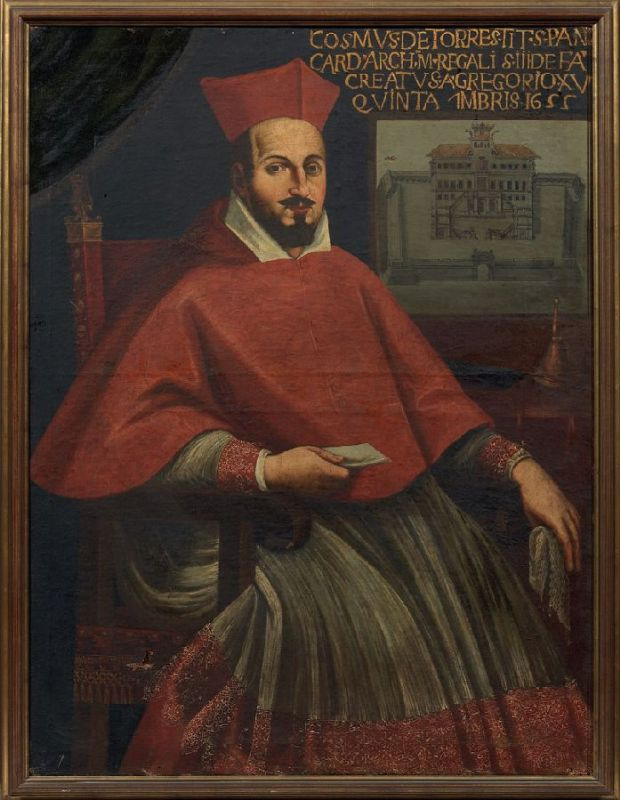
- Church: Catholic Church
- In office: 1634–1642
- Predecessor: Jerónimo Venero Leyva
- Successor: Giovanni Torresiglia
- Other post: Cardinal-Priest of Santa Maria in Trastevere (1641–42)
- Previous posts: Titular Archbishop of Hadrianopolis in Haemimonto (1621–22); Apostolic Nuncio to Poland (1621–22); Prefect of the Congregation of the Council (1623–26); Bishop of Perugia (1624–34); Cardinal-Priest of San Pancrazio (1623–41)

Orders
- Consecration: April 25, 1621 by Maffeo Barberini
- Rank: Cardinal-Priest

Personal details
- Born: 1584 Rome, Papal States
- Died: 1 May 1642 (age 58) Rome, Papal States

Cosimo de Torres also Cosmo de Torres and Cosma de Torres (1584–1642) was a Roman Catholic cardinal who served as Cardinal-Priest of Santa Maria in Trastevere (1641–1642), Cardinal-Priest of San Pancrazio (1623–1641), Archbishop of Monreale (1634–1642), Bishop of Perugia (1624–1634), Apostolic Nuncio to Poland (1621–1622), and Titular Archbishop of Hadrianopolis in Haemimonto (1621–1622).

== Biography ==
Cosimo de Torres was born to a noble family in Rome, Italy in 1584, the son of Marchis Giovanni de Torres and Giulia Mattei, princess of Papareschi. His family was of Spanish descent having moved from Málaga, Spain in the early 16th century. His uncles Girolamo Mattei (named cardinal in 1586) and Ludovico de Torres, iuniore (named cardinal in 1606) were also cardinals. Torres obtained a doctorate in utroque iure in canon and civil law from the University of Perugia. After school, he was assigned to the college of protonotaries apostolic under the guidance of his uncle, Cardinal Mattei. In 1608, he served on the Referendary of the Tribunals of the Apostolic Signature of Justice and of Grace.

On March 17, 1621, he was elected during the papacy of Pope Gregory XV as Titular Archbishop of Hadrianopolis in Haemimonto with special dispensation for not yet receiving the presbyterate. On April 25, 1621, he was consecrated bishop in the church of S. Andrea della Valle by Maffeo Barberini, Cardinal-Priest of Sant'Onofrio, with Diofebo Farnese, Titular Patriarch of Jerusalem, and Ulpiano Volpi, Bishop of Novara, serving as co-consecrators. Giovanni Mascardi, Bishop of Nebbio, was consecrated in the same ceremony.

On May 21, 1621, he was appointed during the papacy of Pope Gregory XV as Apostolic Nuncio to Poland where he served until December 2, 1622. On September 5, 1622, he was elevated to Cardinal by Pope Gregory XV in the Consistory of 1622 and installed on March 20, 1623, with the title of Cardinal-Priest of San Pancrazio. On May 22, 1623, he was named to the Prefect of the S.C. of the Tridentine Council where he served until 1626. He successively served as Abbot of S. Maria di Perno; Abbot of S. Giovanni di Tremisto; and Abbot of S. Nicola di Mamola. was As cardinal, he participated in the Conclave of 1623 which elected Pope Urban VIII. On September 16, 1624, he was appointed during the papacy of Pope Urban VIII as Bishop of Perugia. On January 9, 1634, he was appointed as Camerlengo of the Sacred College of Cardinals where he served until January 8, 1635. On April 3, 1634, he was appointed during the papacy of Pope Urban VIII as Archbishop of Monreale which had previously been occupied by both his grand-uncle Ludovico II de Torres and his uncle Cardinal Ludovico III de Torres. On July 1, 1641, he was appointed by Pope Urban VIII as Cardinal-Priest of Santa Maria in Trastevere.

Torres died on May 1, 1642, in Rome from dropsy and is buried in the church of S. Pancrazio in Rome.

== Episcopal succession ==
Episcopal succession of Cosimo de Torres

While bishop, he was the principal consecrator of:

- Tommaso Carafa, Bishop of Vulturara e Montecorvino (1623);
- Gennaro Filomarino, Bishop of Calvi Risorta (1623);
- Pier Luigi Carafa, Bishop of Tricarico (1624);
- Giovanni Battista Indelli, Bishop of San Marco (1624);
- Antimo degli Atti, Bishop of Ortona a Mare e Campli (1624);
- Francesco Traina, Bishop of Agrigento (1627);
- Jan Baikowski, Auxiliary Bishop of Poznań and Titular Bishop of Aenus (1627);
- Paul Aldringen, Auxiliary Bishop of Strasbourg and Titular Bishop of Tripolis in Phoenicia (1627);
- Mikołaj Gabriel Fredro, Bishop of Bacău (1627);
- Francesco Maria Brancaccio, Bishop of Capaccio (1627);
- Annibale Mascambruno, Bishop of Castellammare di Stabia (1627);
- Luis Jiménez, Bishop of Ugento (1627);
- Giacomo Marenco, Bishop of Saluzzo (1627);
- Gaspar Gajosa, Bishop of L'Aquila (1628);
- Zacharie Novowski, Auxiliary Bishop of Lviv and Titular Bishop of Nicopolis ad Iaterum (1634);

and the principal co-consecrator of:

- Ludovico Ludovisi, Archbishop of Bologna (1621); and
- Agostino Morosini, Titular Archbishop of Damascus (1621).

== External links and additional sources ==
- Cheney, David M. "Hadrianopolis in Haemimonto (Titular See)". Catholic-Hierarchy.org. (for Chronology of Bishops)
- Chow, Gabriel. "Titular Metropolitan See of Hadrianopolis in Hæmimonto (Turkey)". GCatholic.org. (for Chronology of Bishops)
- Cheney, David M. "Archdiocese of Perugia-Città della Pieve". Catholic-Hierarchy.org. (for Chronology of Bishops)
- Chow, Gabriel. "Metropolitan Archdiocese of Perugia-Città della Pieve (Italy)". GCatholic.org. (for Chronology of Bishops)

Catholic Church titles
Preceded by Vitaliano Visconti Borromeo	Titular Archbishop of Hadrianopolis in Haemimonto; 1621–1622	Succeeded by Giovanni Benini
Preceded by Francesco Diotallevi	Apostolic Nuncio to Poland; 1621–1622	Succeeded by Giovanni Battista Lancellotti
Preceded by Gabriel Trejo y Paniagua	Cardinal-Priest of San Pancrazio; 1623–1641	Succeeded by Gaspare Mattei
Preceded by Roberto Ubaldini	Prefect of the Congregation of the Council; 1623–1626	Succeeded by Fabrizio Verospi
Preceded by Napoleone Comitoli	Bishop of Perugia; 1624–1634	Succeeded by Benedetto Ubaldi
Preceded by Jerónimo Venero Leyva	Archbishop of Monreale; 1634–1642	Succeeded by Giovanni Torresiglia
Preceded by Guido Bentivoglio d'Aragona	Cardinal-Priest of Santa Maria in Trastevere; 1641–1642	Succeeded by Antonio Marcello Barberini
