= Giovanni Francesco Biancolella =

Most Reverend Giovanni Francesco Biancolella
- Bishop of Nicotera
- Church: Catholic Church
- Diocese: Diocese of Nicotera
- In office: 1667–1669
- Predecessor: Francesco Cribario
- Successor: Francesco Arrigua

Orders
- Ordination: 29 October 1628

Personal details
- Born: 16 July 1604 Aversa, Italy
- Died: 5 February 1669 (age 64) Nicotera, Italy

Giovanni Francesco Biancolella (16 July 1604 – 5 February 1669) was a Roman Catholic prelate who served as Bishop of Nicotera (1667–1669).

== Biography ==
Giovanni Francesco Biancolella was born in Aversa, Italy on 16 July 1604 and ordained a priest on 29 October 1628. On 22 August 1667, he was appointed during the papacy of Pope Clement IX as Bishop of Nicotera. He served as Bishop of Nicotera until his death on 5 February 1669.

Catholic Church titles
| Preceded by Francesco Cribario | Bishop of Nicotera; 1667–1669 | Succeeded by Francesco Arrigua |
