= Joannes Mattaeus Caryophyllis =

Greek Catholic bishop

Most Reverend Joannes Mattaeus Caryophyllis
- Titular Archbishop of Iconium
- Church: Catholic Church
- In office: 1622–1633

Orders
- Consecration: 18 September 1622 by Francesco Sacrati (cardinal)

Personal details
- Born: 1566 La Canée, Crete
- Died: 23 May 1633 (age 67)

Joannes Mattaeus Caryophyllis (1566–1633) was a Catholic prelate who served as Titular Archbishop of Iconium (1622–1633).

== Biography ==
Joannes Mattaeus Caryophyllis was born in La Canée in 1566. On 8 August 1622, he was appointed during the papacy of Pope Gregory XV as Titular Archbishop of Iconium. On 18 September 1622, he was consecrated bishop by Francesco Sacrati (cardinal), Bishop of Cesena, with Sebastiano Poggi, Bishop Emeritus of Ripatransone, and Girolamo Tantucci, Bishop of Grosseto, serving as co-consecrators. He served as Titular Archbishop of Iconium until his death on 23 May 1633.

== Episcopal succession ==
While bishop, he was the principal co-consecrator of:

- Giovanni Benini, Titular Archbishop of Hadrianopolis in Haemimonto (1622);
- Giovanni Francesco Gandolfo, Bishop of Ventimiglia (1623);
- Pace Giordano, Bishop of Trogir (1623);
- Giovanni Battista Agucchia, Titular Archbishop of Amasea (1623);
- Nicola Benigno, Bishop of Città Ducale (1627);
- Jan Baikowski, Titular Bishop of Aenus and Auxiliary Bishop of Poznań (1627);
- Paul Aldringen, Titular Bishop of Tripolis in Phoenicia and Auxiliary Bishop of Strasbourg (1627); and
- Martin Bonaccina, Titular Bishop of Utica and Auxiliary Bishop of Prague (1631).

== Sources ==
- Cheney, David M. "Iconium (Titular See)". Catholic-Hierarchy.org. (for Chronology of Bishops)
- Chow, Gabriel. "Titular Metropolitan See of Iconium (Turkey)". GCatholic.org. (for Chronology of Bishops)

Catholic Church titles
| Preceded by | Titular Archbishop of Iconium; 1622–1633 | Succeeded by Giulio Caracciolo |
