= Ercole Coppola =

Roman Catholic bishop

Most Reverend Ercole Coppola
- Bishop of Nicotera
- Church: Catholic Church
- Diocese: Diocese of Nicotera
- In office: 1651–1658
- Predecessor: Lodovico Centofiorini
- Successor: Francesco Cribario

Orders
- Consecration: 29 May 1651 by Marcantonio Franciotti

Personal details
- Born: 15 Feb 1603 Gallipoli, Italy
- Died: 1658 (age 54) Nicotera, Italy

Ercole Coppola (15 February, 1603 – 1658) was a Roman Catholic prelate who served as Bishop of Nicotera (1651–1658).

== Biography ==
Ercole Coppola was born in Gallipoli, Italy on 15 February 1603. On 22 May 1651, he was appointed during the papacy of Pope Innocent X as Bishop of Nicotera. On 29 May 1651, he was consecrated bishop by Marcantonio Franciotti, Cardinal-Priest of Santa Maria della Pace, with Giambattista Spada, Patriarch of Constantinople, and Ranuccio Scotti Douglas, Bishop Emeritus of Borgo San Donnino, serving as co-consecrators. He served as Bishop of Nicotera until his death in 1658.

Catholic Church titles
Preceded by Lodovico Centofiorini	Bishop of Nicotera; 1651–1658	Succeeded by Francesco Cribario
