= Bartolomeo Riberi =

Most Reverend Bartolomeo Riberi
- Bishop of Nicotera
- Church: Catholic Church
- Diocese: Diocese of Nicotera
- In office: 1691–1702
- Predecessor: Francesco Arrigua
- Successor: Antonio Manso

Orders
- Ordination: 17 March 1668
- Consecration: 18 November 1691 by Pedro de Salazar Gutiérrez de Toledo

Personal details
- Born: 19 August 1640 Fronteira
- Died: 8 December 1702 (age 62) Nicotera, Italy

Bartolomeo Riberi, O. de M. (19 August, 1640 – 8 December 1702) was a Roman Catholic prelate who served as Bishop of Nicotera (1691–1702).

== Biography ==
Bartolomeo Riberi was born in Fronteira on 19 August 1640 and ordained a priest in the Order of Our Lady of Mercy on 17 March 1668. On 12 November 1691, he was appointed during the papacy of Pope Innocent XII as Bishop of Nicotera. On 18 November 1691, he was consecrated bishop by Pedro de Salazar Gutiérrez de Toledo, Bishop of Córdoba, with Giuseppe Felice Barlacci, Bishop Emeritus of Narni, and Pietro Vecchia (bishop), Bishop Emeritus of Andria, serving as co-consecrators. He served as Bishop of Nicotera until his death on 8 December 1702.

Catholic Church titles
Preceded by Francesco Arrigua	Bishop of Nicotera; 1691–1702	Succeeded by Antonio Manso
