= Camillo Baldi (bishop) =

Roman Catholic bishop

Most Reverend Camillo Baldi
- Bishop of Nicotera
- Church: Catholic Church
- Diocese: Diocese of Nicotera
- In office: 1645–1650
- Predecessor: Carlo Pinto
- Successor: Lodovico Centofiorini

Orders
- Consecration: 19 March 1645 by Giulio Cesare Sacchetti

Personal details
- Died: 1650 Nicotera, Italy

Camillo Baldi (died 1650) was a Roman Catholic prelate who served as Bishop of Nicotera (1645–1650).

== Biography ==
On 6 March 1645, Camillo Baldi was appointed during the papacy of Pope Innocent X as Bishop of Nicotera. On 19 March 1645, he was consecrated bishop by Giulio Cesare Sacchetti, Cardinal-Priest of Santa Susanna, with Onorato Onorati, Bishop of Urbania e Sant'Angelo in Vado, and Papirio Silvestri, Bishop of Macerata e Tolentino, serving as co-consecrators. He served as Bishop of Nicotera until his death in 1650.

Catholic Church titles
Preceded by Carlo Pinto	Bishop of Nicotera; 1645–1650	Succeeded by Lodovico Centofiorini
