= Juan Lorenzo Ibáñez de Arilla =

Roman Catholic prelate

Most Reverend Juan Lorenzo Ibáñez de Arilla
- Bishop of Tropea
- Church: Catholic Church
- Diocese: Diocese of Tropea
- In office: 1697–1726
- Predecessor: Teofilo Testa
- Successor: Angelico Vigilini

Orders
- Ordination: 22 December 1685
- Consecration: 20 January 1697 by Marcantonio Barbarigo

Personal details
- Born: 7 October 1661 Zaragoza, Spain
- Died: 21 October 1726 (age 65) Tropea, Italy

Juan Lorenzo Ibáñez de Arilla, O.E.S.A. (7 October 1661 – 21 October 1726) was a Roman Catholic prelate who served as Bishop of Tropea (1697–1726).

== Biography ==
Juan Lorenzo Ibáñez de Arilla was born in Zaragoza, Spain on 7 October 1661 and ordained a priest in the Order of Hermits of Saint Augustine on 22 December 1685. On 14 January 1697, he was appointed during the papacy of Pope Innocent XII as Bishop of Tropea. On 20 January 1697, he was consecrated bishop by Marcantonio Barbarigo, Bishop of Corneto e Montefiascone, with Carlo Loffredo, Archbishop of Bari-Canosa, and Gennaro Crespino, Bishop of Squillace, serving as co-consecrators. He served as Bishop of Tropea until his death on 21 October 1726.

== External links and additional sources ==
- Cheney, David M. "Diocese of Tropea". Catholic-Hierarchy.org. (for Chronology of Bishops) ^{[self-published]}
- Chow, Gabriel. "Diocese of Tropea (Italy)". GCatholic.org. (for Chronology of Bishops) ^{[self-published]}

Catholic Church titles
Preceded by Teofilo Testa	Bishop of Tropea; 1697–1726	Succeeded by Angelico Vigilini
