= Venosa Cathedral =

Roman Catholic cathedral in Venosa, Basilicata, Italy

Coordinates: 40.9648°N 15.8227°E

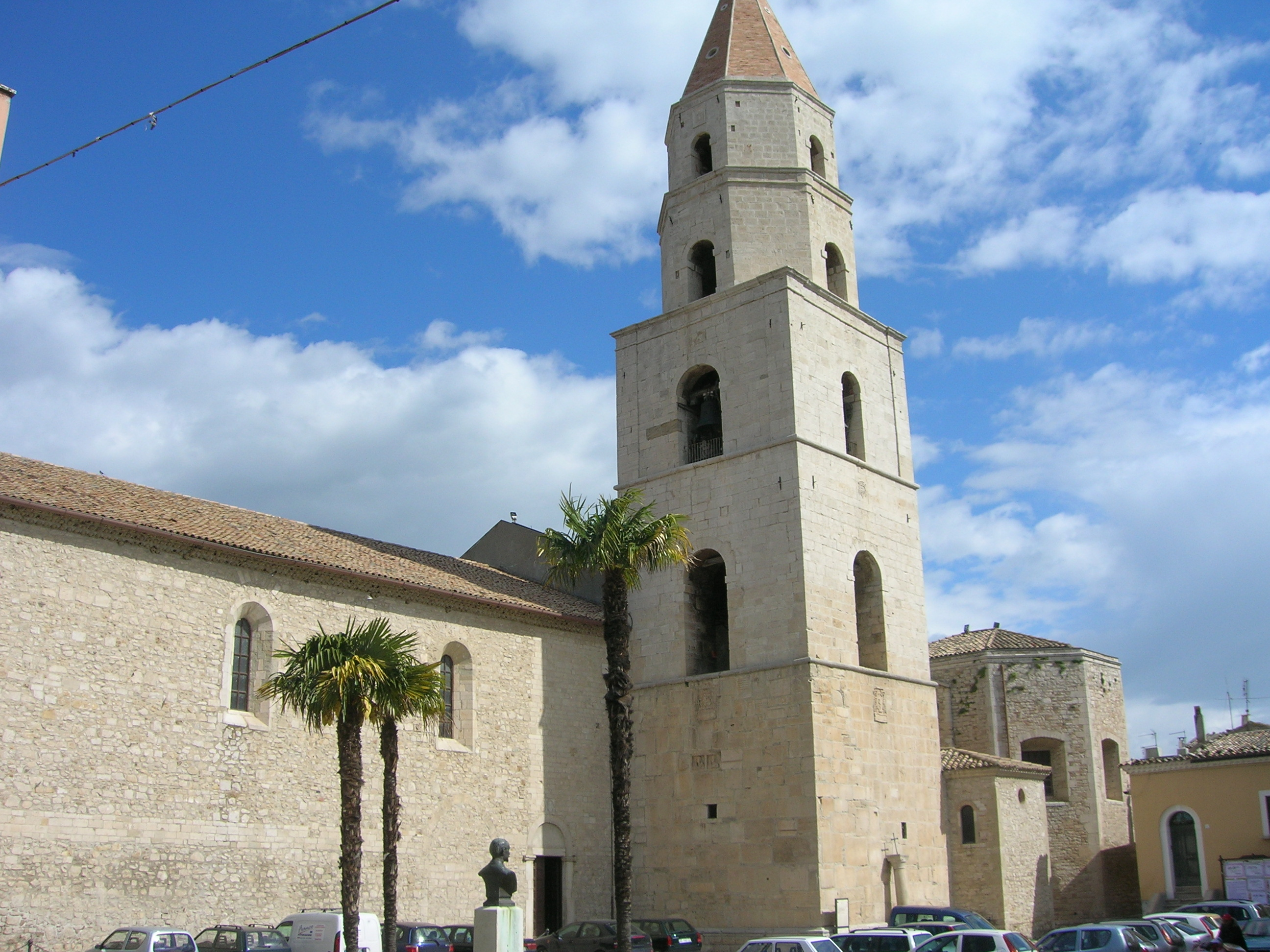
Venosa Cathedral with campanile

Venosa Cathedral (Italian: Duomo di Venosa; Concattedrale di Sant'Andrea) is a Roman Catholic cathedral in Venosa, Basilicata, Italy, dedicated to Saint Andrew. It was constructed between 1470 and 1502, at the behest of Pirro del Balzo. Formerly the episcopal seat of the Diocese of Venosa, since 1986 it has been a co-cathedral in the Diocese of Melfi-Rapolla-Venosa.
