= Francesco Fortezza =

1xth-century Roman Catholic bishop

Most Reverend Francesco Fortezza
- Bishop of Siracusa
- Church: Catholic Church
- In office: 1676–1693
- Predecessor: Francesco Maria Rini
- Successor: Asdrubale Termini

Orders
- Consecration: 20 Dec 1676 by Carlo Pio di Savoia

Personal details
- Born: 1621 Mallorca, Spain
- Died: 13 Nov 1693 (age 72)

Francesco Fortezza (1621–1693) was a Roman Catholic prelate who served as Bishop of Siracusa (1676–1693).

== Biography ==
Francesco Fortezza was born in 1621 in Mallorca, Spain. On 14 Dec 1676, he was appointed during the papacy of Pope Innocent XI as Bishop of Siracusa. On 20 Dec 1676, he was consecrated bishop by Carlo Pio di Savoia, Cardinal-Priest of San Crisogono, with Angelo della Noca, Archbishop Emeritus of Rossano, and Carlo Loffredo, Bishop of Molfetta, serving as co-consecrators. He served as Bishop of Siracusa until his death on 13 Nov 1693.

== External links and additional sources ==
- Cheney, David M. "Archdiocese of Siracusa". Catholic-Hierarchy.org. (for Chronology of Bishops) ^{[self-published]}
- Chow, Gabriel. "Archdiocese of Siracusa (Italy)". GCatholic.org. (for Chronology of Bishops) ^{[self-published]}

Catholic Church titles
Preceded by Francesco Maria Rini	Bishop of Siracusa; 1676–1693	Succeeded by Asdrubale Termini
