= Iconium (Roman Catholic titular see) =

The city of Iconium in Lycaonia has been a Christian bishopric since the 1st century under the Ecumenical Patriarchate of Constantinople. In 1662, a Roman Catholic titular archbishopric (Archidioecesis Iconiensis) was established, although the area had never actually been Catholic in profession.

== List of titular bishops ==
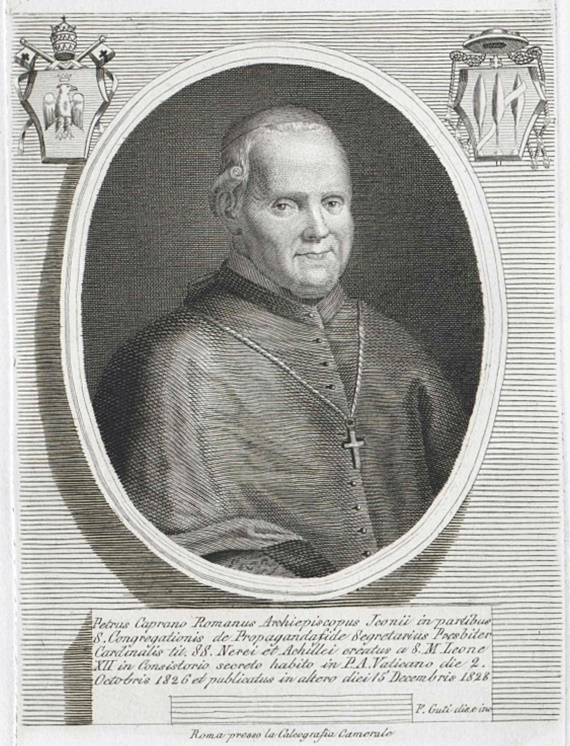
Cardinal Pietro Caprano.

- Joannes Mattaeus Caryophyllis (8 Aug 1622 Appointed – 23 May 1633)
- Giulio Caracciolo, (24 Aug 1671 – )
- Camillo Paolucci (26 Jun 1724 Appointed – 18 Apr 1746)
- Matteo Trigona (1 Apr 1748 Appointed – 29 Jun 1754)
- Agatino Maria Reggio Statella (17 Feb 1755 – 6 Feb 1764)
- Giovanni Battista Caprara Montecuccoli (1 Dec 1766 Appointed – 21 Feb 1794)
- Antonio Maria Odescalchi (1 Jun 1795 – 28 May 1804)
- Pietro Caprano (8 Mar 1816 – 21 May 1829)
- Jean-Baptiste Auvergne (29 Mar 1833 – 7 Sep 1836)
- Niccola Candoni (28 Feb 1837 – 15 Nov 1838)
- Johannes von Geissel (23 May 1842 – 19 Oct 1845)
- Vincenzo Annovazzi (21 Sep 1846 – 4 Aug 1850)
- Antonio Ligi-Bussi, (17 Feb 1851 – 9 Sep 1862)
- Luigi Puecher Passavalli, (17 May 1867 – 4 Oct 1897)
- Raffaele Sirolli (14 Dec 1899 – 20 Apr 1903 Died)
- Luigi Lazzareschi (22 Jun 1903 – 23 Jan 1918 Died)
- Pietro di Maria (11 Jun 1918 – 3 Sep 1937)
- Eugène-Gabriel-Gervais-Laurent Tisserant (25 Jun 1937 Appointed – 18 Feb 1946)
- Luca Ermenegildo Pasetto, (22 Sep 1937 Appointed – 11 Nov 1950)
- Sergio Pignedoli (22 Dec 1950 – 5 Mar 1973)

== Sources ==
- Cheney, David M. "Iconium (Titular See)". Catholic-Hierarchy.org. (for Chronology of Bishops)
- Chow, Gabriel. "Titular Metropolitan See of Iconium (Turkey)". GCatholic.org. (for Chronology of Bishops)
- Pius Bonifacius Gams, Series episcoporum Ecclesiae Catholicae, Leipzig 1931, p. 451
