= Alexander of San Elpidio =

Italian Augustinian bishop (1269–1326)

Alexander of San Elpidio (1269–1326) was an Italian Augustinian bishop.

== Biography ==
He was born in S. Elpidio nella Marca (Ascoli Piceno). In 1300, he was summoned by the Prior General of the Augustinians to be primus lector in the Augustinian studium in Avignon. He studied at the University of Paris, and took the degree of bachelor. In 1303, he attended the General Chapter of his Order in Perugia as a delegate of the province of the Marches. He returned to Paris to continue his studies, taking the degree of master of theology (1308).

He rose to become Prior General of the order of the Hermits of St. Augustine (O.E.S.A.). He attended the General Chapter in Viterbo in 1312, where he was elected to a three-year term. In Padua, in 1315, he was reelected, and in 1318, at Rimini he was elected again. He was re-elected twice more, at Rimini in 1321 and a Montpellier in 1324.

He was known as a writer on theology and political matters, and, for less than eight months, as bishop of Melfi.

Following the report of the death of Bishop Guillelmus of Melfi, Pope John XXII provided (appointed) him to the reserved see of Melfi on 18 February 1326. Bishop Alexander died in Avignon before 6 October 1326.

He was a follower of Giles of Rome, regarded as an extreme papalist. In 1324 he condemned Nicholas of Fabriano for his support of Louis of Bavaria, the opponent of Pope John XXII.

He wrote a commentary on De Civitate Dei.

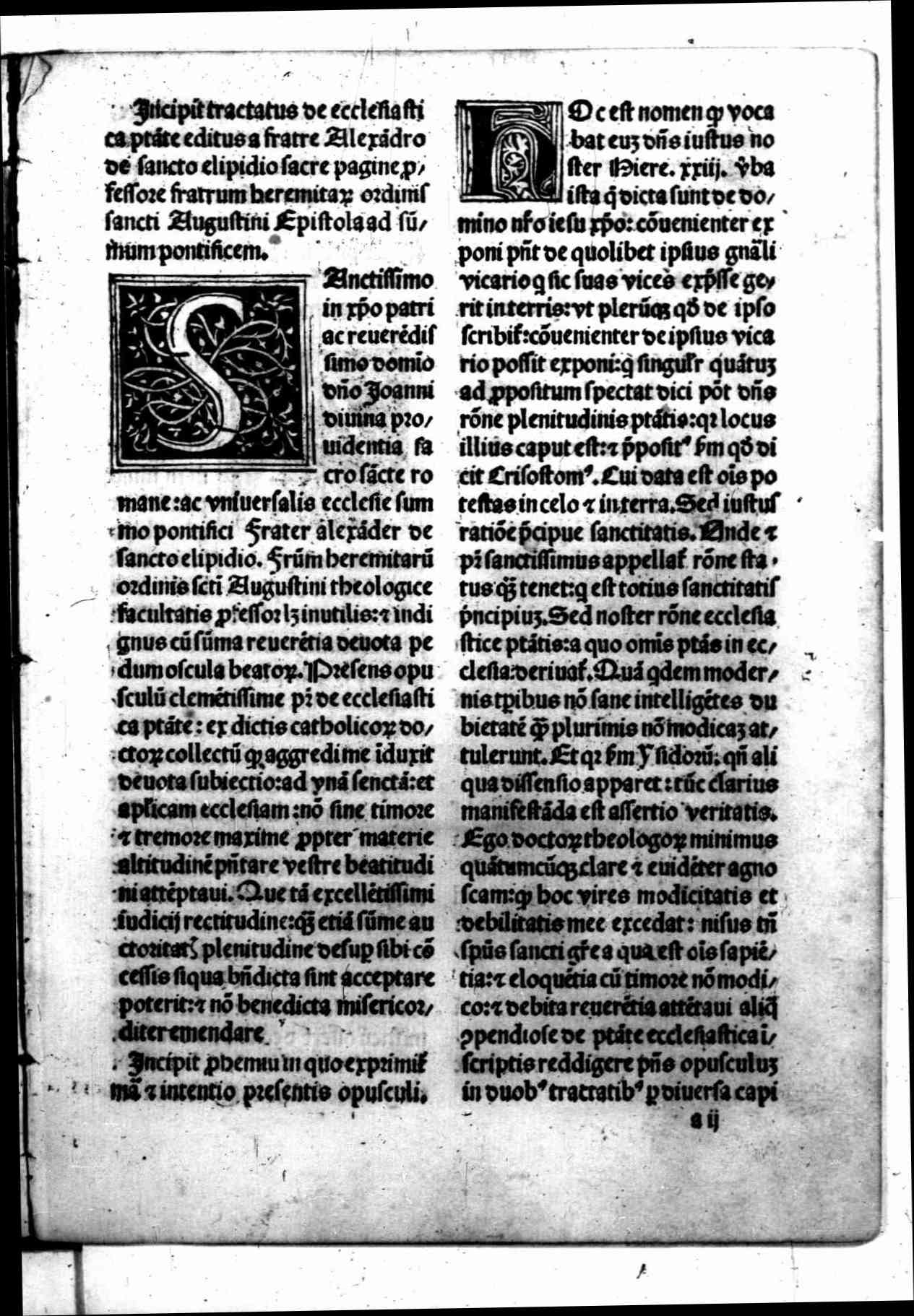
De ecclesiastica potestate, 1494

== Works ==
- Tractatus de ecclesiastica potestate. Aliquoties adest inserta donatio Constantini Magni facta Ecclesiae Romanae.
- De iurisdictione Imperii et auctoritate Summi Pontificis Libri II. Lugduni, Claudius Giboletus, 1498.
- Expositio in Evangelium S. Ioannis
- Compendium librorum B. Augustini de Civitate Dei.
- De cessione sedium, fundatione et mutatione.
- De paupertate Evangelica, Liber 1.
- Alexandri.... Metaphisicae distinctiones.
- Quodlibetorum libri tres.
- Quaestiones ordinariae Theologicae.
- De triplici sacerdotio tractatus tres.
- Commentaria in Aristotelis libros Topicorum et Analyticorum Priorum.

Catalogued by: David Aurelius Perini; and by the Autorenliste of Monumenta Germaniae Historica. Poetae Latini medii aevi.

=== Editions ===
- De ecclesiastica potestate (in Latin). Torino: Nicolas Benedict & Jacobino Suigo. 1494.

== Bibliography ==
- Casagrande, Carla (1995), "FASSITELLI, Alessandro." (in Italian) In: Dizionario Biografico degli Italiani Volume 45 (1995).
- Colucci, Giuseppe (1789). Delle antichità Picene. Tomo V. Fermo: G.A. Paccaroni, 1789. pp. 15-18.
- Eubel, Conradus, ed. (1913). Hierarchia catholica (in Latin). Vol. Tomus 1 (second ed.). Münster: Libreria Regensbergiana.
