= Giovanni Benini =

Italian Roman Catholic prelate

Most Reverend Giovanni Benini
- Titular Archbishop of Hadrianopolis in Haemimonto
- Church: Catholic Church
- In office: 1622–1636
- Predecessor: Cosimo de Torres
- Successor: Giovanni de Torres

Orders
- Consecration: 31 December 1622 by Ulpiano Volpi

Personal details
- Born: 26 June 1569 Rome, Italy
- Died: 2 November 1636 (age 67)

Giovanni Benini (1569–1636) was a Roman Catholic prelate who served as Titular Archbishop of Hadrianopolis in Haemimonto (1622–1636).

== Biography ==
Giovanni Benini was born in Rome, Italy on 26 June 1569. On 18 October 1622, he was appointed during the papacy of Pope Gregory XV as Titular Archbishop of Hadrianopolis in Haemimonto. On 31 December 1622, he was consecrated bishop by Ulpiano Volpi, Bishop of Novara, with Joannes Mattaeus Caryophyllis, Titular Archbishop of Iconium, and Girolamo Tantucci, Bishop of Grosseto, serving as co-consecrators. He served as Titular Archbishop of Hadrianopolis in Haemimonto until his death on 2 November 1636.

While bishop, he was the principal co-consecrator of Federico Baldissera Bartolomeo Cornaro, Bishop of Bergamo (1623).

== External links and additional sources ==
- Cheney, David M. "Hadrianopolis in Haemimonto (Titular See)". Catholic-Hierarchy.org. (for Chronology of Bishops)^{self-published}
- Chow, Gabriel. "Titular Metropolitan See of Hadrianopolis in Hæmimonto (Turkey)". GCatholic.org. (for Chronology of Bishops)^{self-published}

Catholic Church titles
Preceded by Cosimo de Torres	Titular Archbishop of Hadrianopolis in Haemimonto; 1622–1636	Succeeded by Giovanni de Torres
