= Francisco de Figueroa (bishop) =

Most Reverend Francisco de Figueroa
- Bishop of Tropea
- Church: Catholic Church
- Diocese: Diocese of Tropea
- In office: 1685–1691
- Predecessor: Girolamo Borgia
- Successor: Teofilo Testa

Personal details
- Born: 16 January 1634 Medinaceli, Spain
- Died: 4 October 1691 (age 57) Tropea, Italy

Francisco de Figueroa, O.S.A. (1634–1691) was a Roman Catholic prelate who served as Bishop of Tropea (1685–1691).

== Biography ==
Francisco de Figueroa was born in Medinaceli, Spain on 16 January 1634 and ordained a priest in the Order of Saint Augustine. On 24 January 1685, he was selected by the King of Spain and confirmed by Pope Innocent XI on 9 April 1685 as Bishop of Tropea. He served as Bishop of Tropea until his death on 4 October 1691.

== External links and additional sources ==
- Cheney, David M. "Diocese of Tropea". Catholic-Hierarchy.org. (for Chronology of Bishops) ^{[self-published]}
- Chow, Gabriel. "Diocese of Tropea (Italy)". GCatholic.org. (for Chronology of Bishops) ^{[self-published]}

Catholic Church titles
Preceded by Girolamo Borgia	Bishop of Tropea; 1685–1691	Succeeded by Teofilo Testa
