= Alessandro Egizio =

17th-century Italian Catholic bishop

Most Reverend Alessandro Egizio
- Bishop of Andria
- Church: Catholic Church
- Diocese: Diocese of Andria
- In office: 1657–1689
- Predecessor: Ascanio Cassiani
- Successor: Pietro Vecchia (bishop)

Personal details
- Born: 1597 Minervino, Italy
- Died: April 1689 (age 92) Andria, Italy

Alessandro Egizio (1597–1689) was a Roman Catholic prelate who served as Bishop of Andria (1657–1689).

== Biography ==
Alessandro Egizio was born in Minervino, Italy in 1597. On 17 December 1657, he was appointed during the papacy of Pope Alexander VII as Bishop of Andria. He served as Bishop of Andria until his death in April 1689.

== External links and additional sources ==
- Cheney, David M. "Diocese of Andria". Catholic-Hierarchy.org. (for Chronology of Bishops) ^{[self-published]}
- Chow, Gabriel. "Diocese of Andria (Italy)". GCatholic.org. (for Chronology of Bishops) ^{[self-published]}

Catholic Church titles
Preceded by Ascanio Cassiani	Bishop of Andria; 1657–1689	Succeeded by Pietro Vecchia (bishop)
