= Jan Baikowski =

Polish Roman Catholic prelate

Most Reverend Jan Baikowski
- Church: Catholic Church
- Diocese: Diocese of Poznań
- In office: 1626–1651

Orders
- Consecration: 1 May 1627 by Cosimo de Torres

Personal details
- Born: 1590 Podlackiae, Poland
- Died: 1651 (age 61) Poznań, Poland

Jan Baikowski (1590–1651) was a Roman Catholic prelate who served as Titular Bishop of Aenus (1626–1651) and Auxiliary Bishop of Poznań (1626–1651).

== Biography ==
Jan Baikowski was born in Podlackiae, Poland in 1590. On 2 December 1626, he was appointed during the papacy of Pope Urban VIII as Titular Bishop of Aenus and Auxiliary Bishop of Poznań. On 1 May 1627, he was consecrated bishop by Cosimo de Torres, Cardinal-Priest of San Pancrazio, with Joannes Mattaeus Caryophyllis, Titular Archbishop of Iconium, and Germanicus Mantica, Titular Bishop of Famagusta, serving as co-consecrators. He served as Auxiliary Bishop of Poznań until his death in 1651.

== Episcopal succession ==
Episcopal succession of Jan Baikowski

While bishop, he was the principal co-consecrator of:

- Andrzej Szołdrski, Bishop of Kyiv (1634);
- Jan Lipski, Bishop of Chelmno (1636); and
- Zygmunt Miaskowski, Titular Bishop of Chersonesus in Zechia (1645).

Catholic Church titles
Preceded by Joannes Franciscus Gniński	Titular Bishop of Aenus; 1626–1651	Succeeded by Joannes Branecki
Preceded by	Auxiliary Bishop of Poznań; 1626–1651	Succeeded by
