= Jerónimo Venero Leyva =

Most Reverend Jerónimo Venero Leyva
- Archbishop of Monreale
- Church: Catholic Church
- Archdiocese: Archdiocese of Monreale
- In office: 1620–1628
- Predecessor: Arcangelo Gualtieri
- Successor: Cosimo de Torres

Orders
- Consecration: 23 February 1620 by Giovanni Garzia Mellini

Personal details
- Born: 1561 Valladolid, Spain
- Died: August 1628 (age 67) Monreale, Italy

Jerónimo Venero Leyva (1561 – August 1628) was a Roman Catholic prelate who served as Archbishop of Monreale (1620–1628).

== Biography ==
Jerónimo Venero Leyva was born in Valladolid, Spain in 1561. On 17 February 1620, he was appointed during the papacy of Pope Paul V as Archbishop of Monreale. On 23 February 1620, he was consecrated bishop by Giovanni Garzia Mellini, Cardinal-Priest of Santi Quattro Coronati, with Paolo De Curtis, Bishop Emeritus of Isernia, and Antonio de Franchis, Bishop of Andria, serving as co-consecrators. He served as Archbishop of Monreale until his death in August 1628.

== External links and additional sources ==
- Cheney, David M. "Archdiocese of Monreale". Catholic-Hierarchy.org. (for Chronology of Bishops) ^{[self-published]}
- Chow, Gabriel. "Archdiocese of Monreale (Italy)". GCatholic.org. (for Chronology of Bishops) ^{[self-published]}

Catholic Church titles
| Preceded by Arcangelo Gualtieri | Archbishop of Monreale; 1620–1628 | Succeeded by Cosimo de Torres |
