= Pietro Vecchia (bishop) =

17th-century Italian Catholic bishop

Most Reverend Pietro Vecchia
- Bishop of Molfetta
- Church: Catholic Church
- Diocese: Diocese of Molfetta
- In office: 1691–1695
- Predecessor: Carlo Loffredo
- Successor: Domenico Belisario de Bellis
- Previous post: Bishop of Andria (1690–1691)

Orders
- Consecration: 6 March 1690 by Pietro Francesco Orsini de Gravina

Personal details
- Born: 8 January 1628 Venice, Italy
- Died: July 1695 (age 67) Molfetta, Italy

Pietro Vecchia, O.S.B. (8 January 1628 – July 1695) was a Roman Catholic prelate who served as Bishop of Molfetta (1691–1695) and Bishop of Andria (1690–1691).

== Biography ==
Pietro Vecchia was born in Venice, Italy on 8 January 1628 and ordained a priest in the Order of Saint Benedict. On 6 March 1690, he was appointed during the papacy of Pope Alexander VIII as Bishop of Andria. On 6 March 1690, he was consecrated bishop by Pietro Francesco Orsini de Gravina, Archbishop of Benevento, with Giuseppe Bologna, Archbishop Emeritus of Benevento, and Gregorio Giuseppe Gaetani de Aragonia, Titular Archbishop of Neocaesarea in Ponto, serving as co-consecrators. On 19 December 1691, he was appointed during the papacy of Pope Innocent XII as Bishop of Molfetta. He served as Bishop of Molfetta until his death in July 1695.

== Episcopal succession ==
While bishop, Vecchia was the principal co-consecrator of:

- Bartolomeo Riberi, Bishop of Nicotera (1691);
- Carolus de Tilly, Bishop of Acerra (1692); and
- Francesco Antonio Triveri, Bishop of Andria (1692).

== External links and additional sources ==
- Cheney, David M. "Diocese of Andria". Catholic-Hierarchy.org. (for Chronology of Bishops) ^{[self-published]}
- Chow, Gabriel. "Diocese of Andria (Italy)". GCatholic.org. (for Chronology of Bishops) ^{[self-published]}
- Cheney, David M. "Diocese of Molfetta-Ruvo-Giovinazzo-Terlizzi". Catholic-Hierarchy.org. (for Chronology of Bishops) ^{[self-published]}
- Chow, Gabriel. "Diocese of Molfetta-Ruvo-Giovinazzo-Terlizzi (Italy)". GCatholic.org. (for Chronology of Bishops) ^{[self-published]}

Catholic Church titles
Preceded by Alessandro Egizio	Bishop of Andria; 1690–1691	Succeeded by Francesco Antonio Triveri
Preceded by Carlo Loffredo	Bishop of Molfetta; 1691–1695	Succeeded by Domenico Belisario de Bellis
