= Francesco Cribario =

Most Reverend Francesco Cribario
- Bishop of Nicotera
- Church: Catholic Church
- Diocese: Diocese of Nicotera
- In office: 1658–1667
- Predecessor: Ercole Coppola
- Successor: Giovanni Francesco Biancolella

Personal details
- Died: 3 March 1667 Nicotera, Italy

Francesco Cribario (died 1667) was a Roman Catholic prelate who served as Bishop of Nicotera (1658–1667).

== Biography ==
On 6 May 1658, Francesco Cribario was appointed during the papacy of Pope Alexander VII as Bishop of Nicotera. He served as Bishop of Nicotera until his death on 3 March 1667.

Catholic Church titles
| Preceded by Ercole Coppola | Bishop of Nicotera; 1658–1667 | Succeeded by Giovanni Francesco Biancolella |
