= Ottaviano Capece =

Most Reverend Ottaviano Capece
- Bishop of Nicotera
- Church: Catholic Church
- Diocese: Diocese of Nicotera
- In office: 1582–1616
- Predecessor: Luca Antonio Resta
- Successor: Carlo Pinto

Personal details
- Died: 1616 Nicotera, Italy

Ottaviano Capece (died 1616) was a Roman Catholic prelate who served as Bishop of Nicotera (1582–1616).

== Biography ==
On 21 May 1582, Ottaviano Capece was appointed during the papacy of Pope Gregory XIII as Bishop of Nicotera. He served as Bishop of Nicotera until his death in 1616.

Catholic Church titles
Preceded by Luca Antonio Resta	Bishop of Nicotera; 1582–1616	Succeeded by Carlo Pinto
