= Antonio Spinelli (bishop) =

18th-century Italian Roman Catholic bishop

Most Reverend Antonio Spinelli
- Bishop of Melfi e Rapolla
- Church: Catholic Church
- Diocese: Diocese of Melfi e Rapolla
- In office: 1697–1724
- Predecessor: Francesco Antonio Triveri
- Successor: Mondilio Orsini

Orders
- Consecration: 8 December 1697 by Baldassare Cenci (seniore)

Personal details
- Born: 1657 Aquaro Feudo, Italy
- Died: October 1724 (aged 66–67)

Antonio Spinelli, C.R. (1657 – October 1724) was a Roman Catholic prelate who served as Bishop of Melfi e Rapolla (1697–1724).

== Biography ==
Antonio Spinelli was born in Aquaro Feudo, Italy in 1657 and ordained a priest in the Congregation of Clerics Regular of the Divine Providence. On 2 December 1697, he was appointed during the papacy of Pope Innocent XII as Bishop of Melfi e Rapolla. On 8 December 1697, he was consecrated bishop by Baldassare Cenci (seniore), Archbishop of Fermo, with Prospero Bottini, Titular Archbishop of Myra, and Sperello Sperelli, Bishop of Terni, serving as co-consecrators. He served as Bishop of Melfi e Rapolla until his death in October 1724.

== Episcopal succession ==
While bishop, Spinelli was the principal co-consecrator of:

- Francesco Acquaviva d'Aragona, Titular Archbishop of Larissa in Thessalia (1697); and
- Giulio Piazza, Titular Archbishop of Rhodus (1697).

== External links and additional sources ==
- Cheney, David M. "Diocese of Melfi-Rapolla-Venosa". Catholic-Hierarchy.org. (for Chronology of Bishops) ^{[self-published]}
- Chow, Gabriel. "Diocese of Melfi-Rapolla-Venosa (Italy)". GCatholic.org. (for Chronology of Bishops) ^{[self-published]}

Catholic Church titles
Preceded by Francesco Antonio Triveri	Bishop of Melfi e Rapolla; 1697–1724	Succeeded by Mondilio Orsini
