= Diocese of Melfi-Rapolla-Venosa =

Roman Catholic diocese in Italy

Diocese of Melfi-Rapolla-Venosa Dioecesis Melphiensis-Rapollensis-Venusina Diocesi di Melfi-Rapolla-Venosa

Catholic
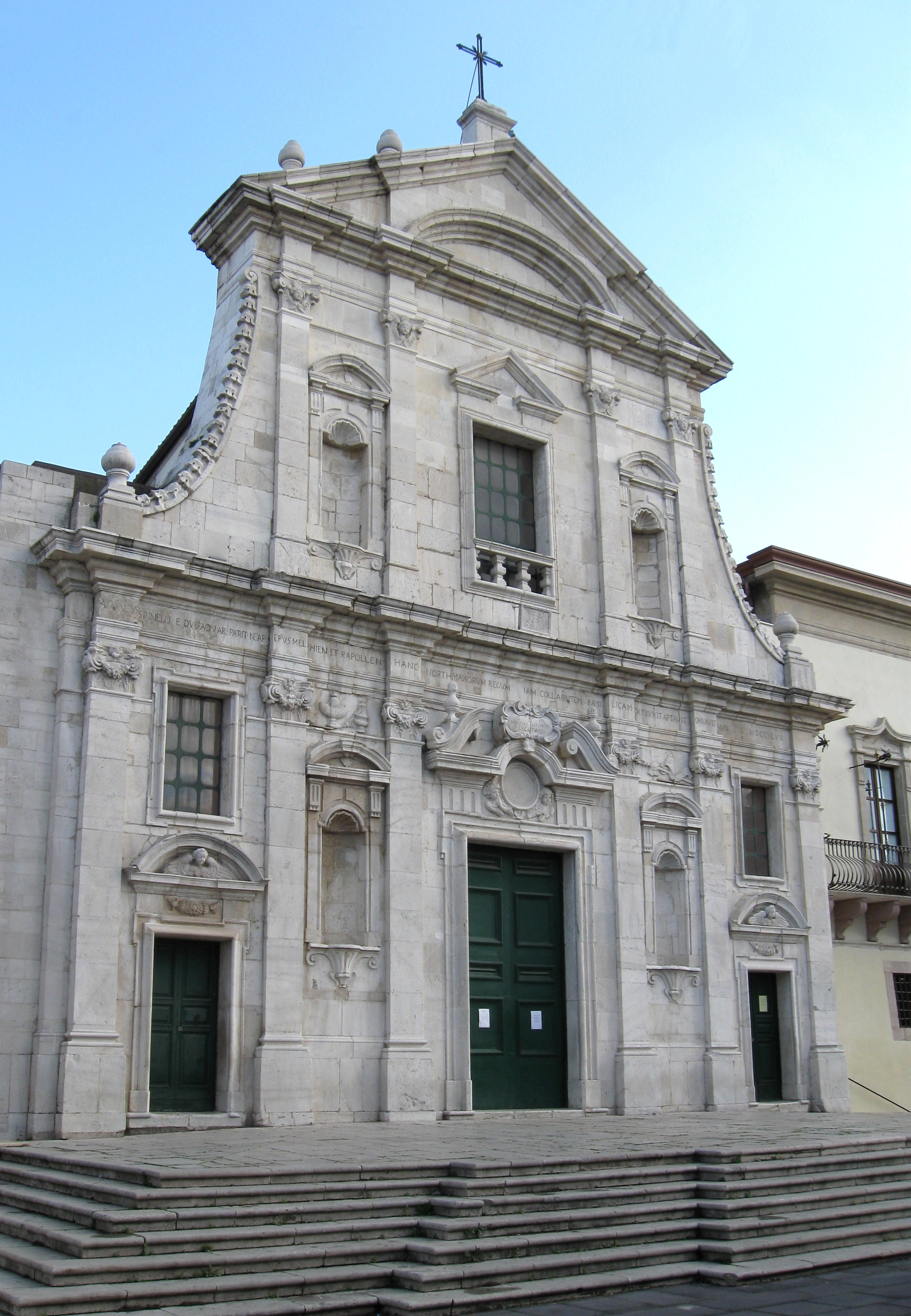
- Melfi Cathedral

Location
- Country: Italy
- Ecclesiastical province: Potenza-Muro Lucano-Marsico Nuovo

Statistics
- Area: 1,316 km^{2} (508 sq mi)
- Population: Total; Catholics: (as of 2023); 85,000 (est.) ▼; 79,000 (guess) ▼
- Parishes: 32 ▼

Information
- Denomination: Catholic Church
- Rite: Roman Rite
- Established: 11th century
- Cathedral: Basilica Cattedrale di S. Maria Assunta (Melfi)
- Co-cathedral: Concattedrale di S. Andrea (Venosa); Concattedrale di S. Michele Arcangelo (Rapolla)
- Secular priests: 27 (diocesan) ▼9 (Religious Orders) ▲7 Permanent Deacons ▼

Current leadership
- Pope: Leo XIV
- Bishop: Ciro Fanelli
- Bishops emeritus: Gianfranco Todisco, P.O.C.R.

Map
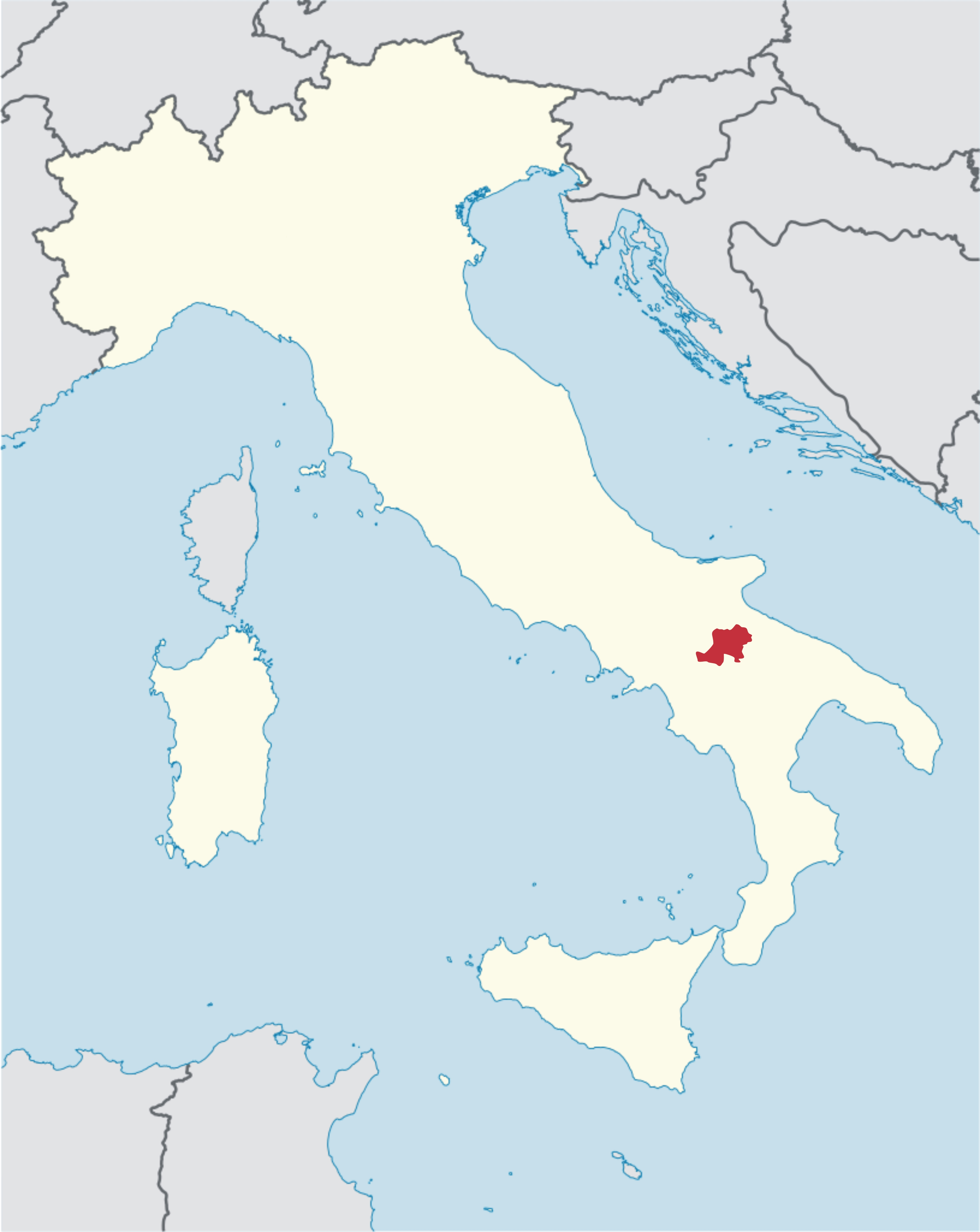

Website
- www.diocesimelfi.it

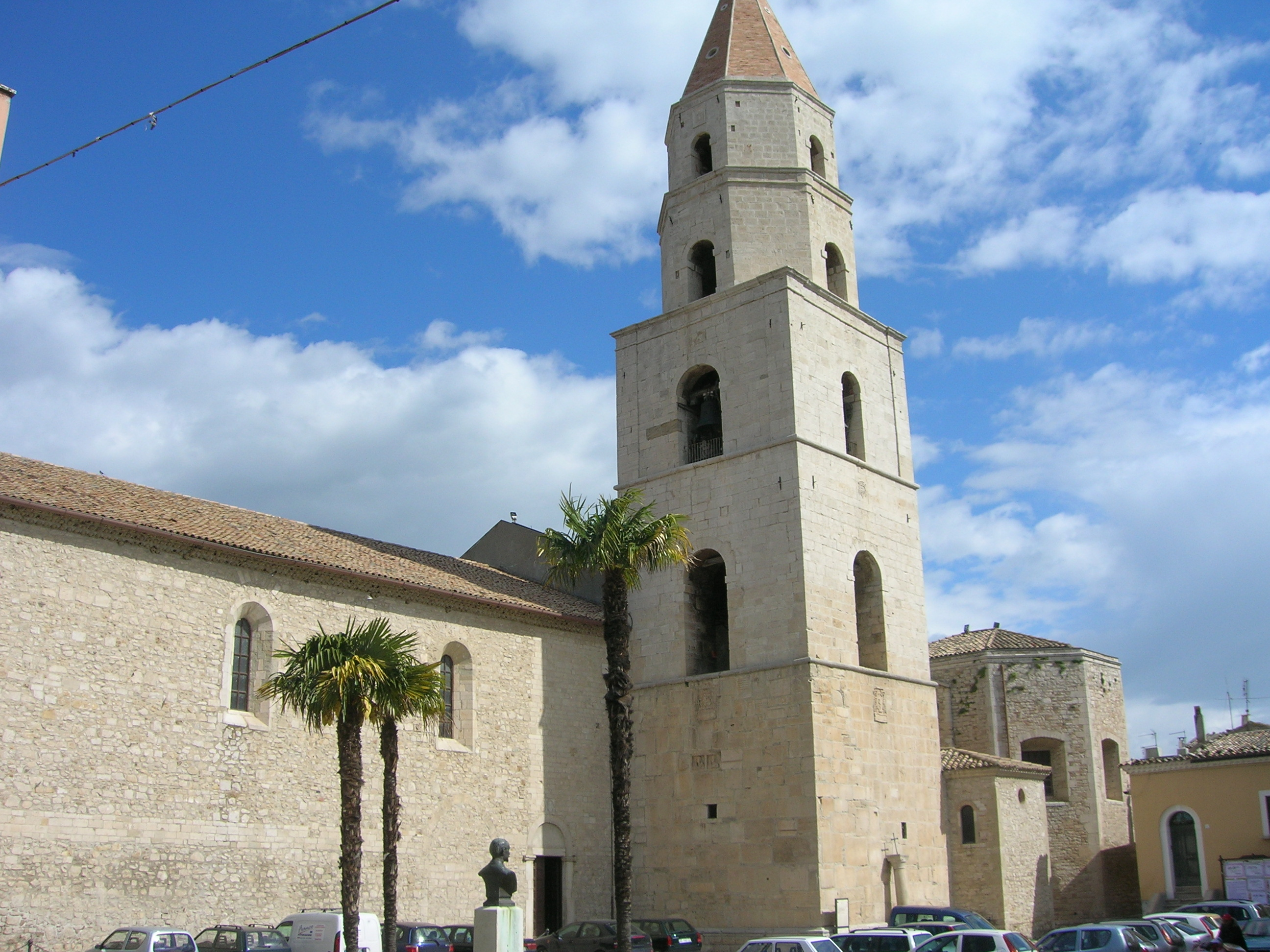
Co-cathedral in Venosa

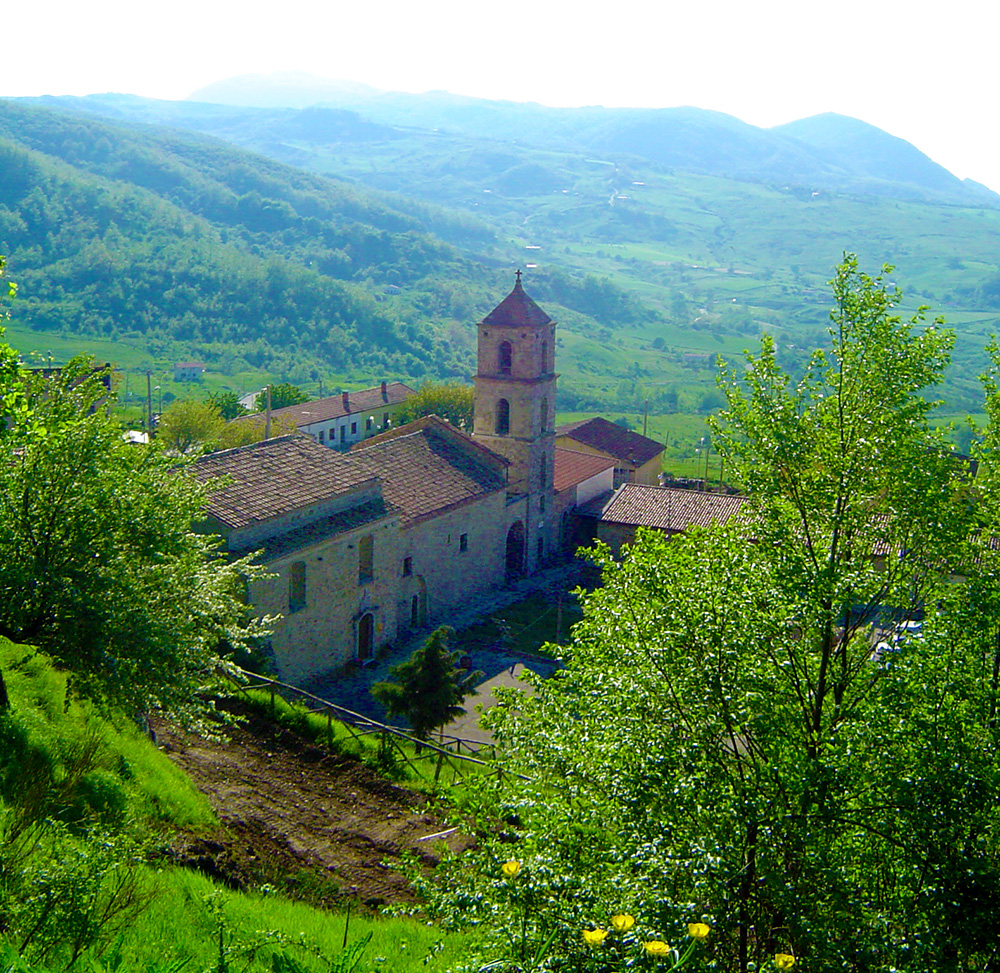
Abbey of Santa Maria di Pierno in San Fele

The Diocese of Melfi-Rapolla-Venosa (Latin: Dioecesis Melphiensis-Rapollensis-Venusina, Italian: Diocesi di Melfi-Rapolla-Venosa) is a Latin diocese of the Catholic Church in Basilicata, southern Italy. In 1986 the historic Diocese of Melfi-Rapolla was united with the Diocese of Venosa. The diocese is a suffragan of the Archdiocese of Potenza-Muro Lucano-Marsico Nuovo. The Abbey of the Santissima Trinità at Venosa comes under the Diocese.

== History ==
On 23 August 1059, Pope Nicholas II (1059–1061) held a council in Melphi, with more than one hundred bishops in attendance. In the council, he deposed the bishop of Montepeloso for simony and adultery; the bishop of Tricarico for being underage; Bishop Johannes of Trani; and the Bishop of Ascoli Puglia. He also invested Robert Guiscard as duke of Apulia, Calabria, and Sicily.

The pope made the diocese of Melfi immediately dependent on the Holy See; its first bishop was Baldwin. Its cathedral, a work of Roger Borsa, son of Robert Guiscard (1155), was destroyed by the earthquake of 1851.

The second council to be held at Melfi was presided over by Pope Alexander II (1067–1073) in 1067, during the episcopacy of Bishop Balduinus. Guillaume, the son of Tancred, was excommunicated, along with his soldiers, for having conquered Salerno. Bishop Balduinus was later suspended from his episcopal office by Pope Alexander, but was restored in March 1076, after due penance for his excesses, by Pope Gregory VII.

In September 1089, Pope Urban II (1088–1099) held his first council at Melfi. It legislated against simony and against clerical marriage. The Norman Roger Borsa took an oath of fealty to Pope Urban, who invested him with the duchy of Apulia and Salerno.

Pope Paschal II confirmed, in a bull of 29 September 1101 (Per Apostoli Petri), the privilege granted to the bishops of Melfi of being consecrated by the Roman pontiff.

In 1528, Clement VII, in view of the scarcity of its revenues, united the Diocese of Rapolla to that of Melfi, "aeque principaliter".

Bishop Lazzaro Carafino (1622–1626) held a diocesan synod in Melfi in 1624. Bishop Deodato Scaglia (1626–1644) presided over a diocesan synod of Melfi and Rapolla in 1635. A diocesan synod was held in Melfi on 11–13 October 1725 by Bishop Mondilio Orsini (1724 –1728).

=== Diocesan reorganization ===
The Second Vatican Council (1962–1965), in order to ensure that all Catholics received proper spiritual attention, decreed the reorganization of the diocesan structure of Italy and the consolidation of small and struggling dioceses. It also recommended the abolition of anomalous units such as exempt territorial prelatures. These considerations applied to Melfi and to Rapolla, as the population migrated in the post-war period away from agriculture to jobs on the coast.

On 18 February 1984, the Vatican and the Italian State signed a new and revised concordat. Based on the revisions, a set of Normae was issued on 15 November 1984, which was accompanied in the next year, on 3 June 1985, by enabling legislation. According to the agreement, the practice of having one bishop govern two separate dioceses at the same time, aeque personaliter, was abolished. Instead, the Vatican continued consultations which had begun under Pope John XXIII for the merging of small dioceses, especially those with personnel and financial problems, into one combined diocese. On 30 September 1986, Pope John Paul II ordered that the dioceses of Melfi, Rapallo, and Venosa be merged into one diocese with one bishop, with the Latin title Dioecesis Melphiensis-Rapollensis-Venusina. The seat of the diocese was to be in Melphi, and the cathedral of Melfi was to serve as the cathedral of the merged dioceses. The cathedrals in Rapolla and Venosa were to become co-cathedrals, and the cathedral Chapters were each to be a Capitulum Concathedralis. There was to be only one diocesan Tribunal, in Melfi, and likewise one seminary, one College of Consultors, and one Priests' Council. The territory of the new diocese was to include the territory of the former dioceses of Melphi, Rapolla, and Venosa.

On 11 February 1973, Pope Paul VI had promoted the diocese of Potenza e Marsico Nuovo to the status of an archdiocese, and made it immediately subject to the papacy, rather than to some other archdiocese in the regions of Basilicata or Lucania. It had been suffragan to the archdiocese of Acerenza. The bishop was given the rank of archbishop, and granted the right to use the processional cross and the pallium. The diocese of Melphi-Rapolla-Venosa was made a suffragan of Potenza-Muro Lucano-Marsico Nuovo.

=== Chapter and cathedral ===
The cathedral of Melfi, dedicated to the Taking Up of the Body of the Virgin Mary into Heaven (Assumption), was administered by a corporation called a Chapter, composed of four dignities (the Cantor, the Primicerius, the Treasurer, and the Vice-Cantor) and sixteen canons. In 1748, there were four dignities and twenty-two canons.

The cathedral Chapter of Rapolla had three dignities and five canons.

In 1764, Venosa had a population of about 4,000 persons. Its cathedral, dedicated to S. Andrew, had a Chapter composed of four dignities and twenty canons. When Venosa became united to the diocese of Melfi in 1986, it had a population of less than 34,000, with only twenty priests to serve them.

== Bishops ==
=== Diocese of Melfi ===
- Balduin (1059–1093)

...

- Radulfus (attested 1177–1179)

...

- Jacobus (attested 1183–1185)
- Guillelmus (attested 1193–1199)

...

- Jacobus
- R(---) (attested 1204?–1213)
- Richerius (attested 1218–1232)

...
Sede vacante (1239–1240)
...

- Rogerius de Lentino (1252)

...

- Garnerus de Villari-Bello (1266) Bishop-elect
- Francesco de Monaldeschis (attested 1278–1280)
- Sinibaldo, O.Min. (1280–1295)
- Saracenus (1295–1316)
- Constantinus of Reggio (1317–1324)
- Guillelmus (1324–1326)
- Alexander of San Elpidio (1326)
- Monaldus Monaldi, O.Min. (1326–1331)
- Jacobus (1331–1347)
- Petrus (1347–1348)
- Joannes
- Nicolaus (1349)
- Nicolaus Caracciolo (1349–1362)
- Antonius
- Pandulfus
- Franciscus (1369– )
- Elias (1384– ) Avignon Obedience
- Nicolaus Avignon Obedience
- Jacobus (1382– ) Roman Obedience
- Antonius de Samudia (1384– ) Roman Obedience
- Giovanni Dominici, O.P. (2 Mar 1412 –1412)
- Francesco Carosio (4 Jul 1412 –1418)
- Giacomo Isolani (1420 – 24 Jan 1425 Resigned)
- Francesco Palombo, O.S.B. (12 Dec 1431 – 1437 Died)
- Onofrio di Francesco di Sanseverino (11 Jan 1437 – 1450 Died)
- Alfonso Costa (4 Sep 1450 Appointed – )
- Gaspare Loffredi (17 Apr 1472 – 1480 Died)
- Ottaviano Bentivoglio (15 Dec 1480 – 1486)
- Francesco Caracciolo (bishop) (Carazoli) (24 Jun 1486 – 1494 Died)
- Juan de Borja Lanzol de Romaní, el menor (September 19, 1494/December 3, 1498 – August 1, 1503)
- Jean Ferrier I (3 Dec 1498 – 1499)
- Raffaele di Ceva, O.F.M. (26 Jul 1499 – 1513 Resigned)
- Lorenzo Pucci (12 Aug 1513 – 16 Mar 1528 Resigned)

=== Diocese of Melfi e Rapolla ===
Latin Name: Melphiensis et Rapollensis
United: 16 May 1528 with Diocese of Rapolla

- Giannotto Pucci (16 Mar 1528 – 1537 Died)
- Giovanni Vincenzo Acquaviva d'Aragona (7 Feb 1537 – 16 Aug 1546 Died)
- Roberto Pucci (7 Dec 1546 – 17 Jan 1547 Died)
- Mario Ruffino (7 Feb 1547 – 1548 Died)
- Alessandro Ruffino (27 Apr 1548 – 1573 Resigned)
- Gaspare Cenci (8 Jan 1574 – 1590 Resigned)
- Orazio Celsi (16 Jul 1590 – 1591 Died)
- Marco Antonio Amidano (13 Sep 1591 – Nov 1591 Resigned)
- Matteo Brumani, O.S.A. (13 Nov 1591 – 9 Aug 1594 Died)
- Placido della Marra (6 Mar 1595 – 2 Dec 1620 Died)
- Desiderio Scaglia, O.P. (17 Mar 1621 – 14 Nov 1622 Appointed, Bishop of Como)
- Lazzaro Carafino (19 Dec 1622 – 7 Jan 1626 Appointed, Bishop of Como)
- Deodato Scaglia, O.P. (19 Jan 1626 – 18 Apr 1644 Appointed, Bishop of Alessandria)
- Giacomo Raimondi (2 May 1644 – Dec 1644 Died)
- Gerolamo Pellegrini (16 Jan 1645 – 12 Apr 1648 Died)
- Luigi Branciforte (28 Sep 1648 – 1665 Died)
- Giulio Caracciolo, C.R. (1 Mar 1666 – 1671 Resigned)
- Tommaso de Franchi (1671–1696)
- Francesco Antonio Triveri, O.F.M. Conv. (24 Sep 1696 – May 1697 Died)
- Antonio Spinelli, C.R. (2 Dec 1697 – Oct 1724 Died)
- Mondilio Orsini, C.O. (20 Nov 1724 – 8 Mar 1728 Appointed, Archbishop of Capua)
- Giovanni Saverio Lioni (22 Nov 1730 – 5 Mar 1735 Died)
- Domenico Rossi (Rosso e Colonna), O.S.B. (26 Sep 1735 – 8 Jul 1737 Appointed, Archbishop of Palermo)
- Luca Antonio della Gatta (8 Jul 1737 – 25 Sep 1747 Died)
- Pasquale Teodoro Basta (29 Jan 1748 – 27 Dec 1765 Died)
- Ferdinando de Vicariis, O.S.B. (14 Apr 1766 – 19 Jun 1780 Died)
- Filippo d’Aprile (27 Feb 1792 – Apr 1811 Died)
- Gioacchino de Gemmis (26 Jun 1818 – 12 Dec 1822 Died)
- Vincenzo Ferrari, O.P. (3 May 1824 – 4 May 1828 Died)
- Luigi Bovio, O.S.B. (18 May 1829 – 6 Nov 1847 Died)
- Ignazio Maria Selitti (5 Nov 1849 – 1880 Resigned)
- Giuseppe Camassa (4 Aug 1881 – 15 Apr 1912 Resigned)
- Alberto Costa (4 Jan 1912 – 7 Dec 1928 Appointed, Bishop of Lecce)
- Luigi dell’Aversana (Orabona) (29 Jul 1930 – 6 Nov 1934 Died)
- Domenico Petroni (1 Apr 1935 – 5 Oct 1966 Retired)
- Giuseppe Vairo (5 Mar 1973 – 25 Oct 1976 Appointed, Bishop of Tricarico)
- Armando Franco (25 Oct 1976 – 12 Sep 1981 Appointed, Bishop of Oria)
- Vincenzo Cozzi (12 Sep 1981 – 13 Dec 2002 Retired)

=== Diocese of Melfi-Rapolla-Venosa ===
Latin Name: Dioecesis Melphiensis-Rapollensis-Venusinus
United: 30 September 1986 with Diocese of Venosa

- Gianfranco Todisco, P.O.C.R. (13 Dec 2002 – 21 Apr 2017 Resigned)
- Ciro Fanelli (4 Aug 2017 –)

== See also ==
- Roman Catholic Archdiocese of Potenza-Muro Lucano-Marsico Nuovo
- Roman Catholic Diocese of Venosa
- Roman Catholic Diocese of Rapolla

== Bibliography ==
- Eubel, Conradus, ed. (1913). Hierarchia catholica (in Latin). Vol. Tomus 1 (second ed.). Münster: Libreria Regensbergiana.
- Eubel, Conradus, ed. (1914). Hierarchia catholica (in Latin). Vol. Tomus 2 (second ed.). Münster: Libreria Regensbergiana.
- Eubel, Conradus; Gulik, Guilelmus (1923). Hierarchia catholica (in Latin). Vol. 3 (second ed.). Münster: Libreria Regensbergiana.
- Gams, Pius Bonifatius (1873). Series episcoporum Ecclesiae catholicae: quotquot innotuerunt a beato Petro apostolo (in Latin). Ratisbon: Typis et Sumptibus Georgii Josephi Manz.
- Gauchat, Patritius (Patrice) (1935). Hierarchia catholica (in Latin). Vol. IV (1592-1667). Münster: Libraria Regensbergiana.
- Ritzler, Remigius; Sefrin, Pirminus (1952). Hierarchia catholica medii et recentis aevi (in Latin). Vol. V (1667-1730). Patavii: Messagero di S. Antonio.
- Ritzler, Remigius; Sefrin, Pirminus (1958). Hierarchia catholica medii et recentis aevi (in Latin). Vol. VI (1730-1799). Patavii: Messagero di S. Antonio.
- Ritzler, Remigius; Sefrin, Pirminus (1968). Hierarchia Catholica medii et recentioris aevi sive summorum pontificum, S. R. E. cardinalium, ecclesiarum antistitum series... A pontificatu Pii PP. VII (1800) usque ad pontificatum Gregorii PP. XVI (1846) (in Latin). Vol. VII. Monasterii: Libr. Regensburgiana.
- Remigius Ritzler; Pirminus Sefrin (1978). Hierarchia catholica Medii et recentioris aevi... A Pontificatu PII PP. IX (1846) usque ad Pontificatum Leonis PP. XIII (1903) (in Latin). Vol. VIII. Il Messaggero di S. Antonio.
- Pięta, Zenon (2002). Hierarchia catholica medii et recentioris aevi... A pontificatu Pii PP. X (1903) usque ad pontificatum Benedictii PP. XV (1922) (in Latin). Vol. IX. Padua: Messagero di San Antonio. ISBN 978-88-250-1000-8.

=== Studies ===
- Antonucci, Giovanni, "II vescovato di Melfi." (in Italian). in: Archivio storico per la Calabria e la Lucania 6 (1936) 35 ff.
- Cappelletti, Giuseppe (1870). Le chiese d'Italia: dalla loro origine sino ai nostri giorni (in Italian). Vol. vigesimoprimo (21). Venezia: G. Antonelli. pp. 419–457.
- Araneo, Gennaro (1866). Notizie storiche della città di Melfi nell'antico reame di Napoli. (in Italian). Firenze: Tip. nazionale di V. Sodi, 1866
- D'Avino, Vincenzio (1848). Cenni storici sulle chiese arcivescovili, vescovili, e prelatizie (nullius) del regno delle due Sicilie (in Italian). Naples: dalle stampe di Ranucci. pp. 326–332.
- Kamp, Norbert (1975). Kirche und Monarchie im staufischen Königreich Sizilien: I. Prosopographische Grundlegung, Bistumer und Bistümer und Bischöfe des Konigreichs 1194–1266: 2. Apulien und Calabrien München: Wilhelm Fink 1975. pp. 486–494.
- Kehr, Paulus Fridolin (1962). Italia pontificia. Regesta pontificum Romanorum. Vol. IX: Samnia – Apulia – Lucania. Berlin: Weidmann. (in Latin). Pp. 154 496-499.
- Mattei-Cerasoli, Leone (1919). "Da archivii e biblioteche: Di alcuni vescovi poco noti". (in Italian). In: Archivio storico per le province Neapolitane 44 (Napoli: Luigi Lubrano 1919). pp. 310–335, at 313.
- Ughelli, Ferdinando; Coleti, Niccolò (1717). Italia sacra, sive De Episcopis Italiae (in Latin). Vol. Tomus primus (secunda ed.). Venice: apud Sebastianum Coleti. pp. 920–942.
