= Vincenzo Cozzi =

Italian Roman Catholic bishop

Vincenzo Cozzi (26 November 1926 – 3 July 2013) was a Catholic bishop.

Ordained to the priesthood in 1950, Cozzi was named bishop of the Diocese of Melfi-Rapolla-Venosa, Italy in 1981 and retired in 2002.
