= Giulio Caracciolo (archbishop of Iconium) =

17th-century Roman Catholic archbishop

Most Reverend Giulio Caracciolo
- Titular Archbishop of Iconium
- Church: Catholic Church
- Previous post: Bishop of Melfi e Rapolla (1666–1671)

Personal details
- Born: 1627 Naples, Kingdom of Naples
- Died: Unknown

Giulio Caracciolo, C.R. (born 1627) was a Roman Catholic prelate who served as Titular Archbishop of Iconium (1671–?) and Bishop of Melfi e Rapolla (1666–1671).

== Biography ==
Giulio Caracciolo was born in Naples, Italy in 1627 and ordained a priest in the Congregation of Clerics Regular of the Divine Providence. On 1 Mar 1666, he was appointed during the papacy of Pope Clement IX as Bishop of Melfi e Rapolla; he resigned in 1671. On 24 Aug 1671, he was appointed during the papacy of Pope Clement X as Titular Archbishop of Iconium.

== External links and additional sources ==
- Cheney, David M. "Diocese of Melfi-Rapolla-Venosa". Catholic-Hierarchy.org. (for Chronology of Bishops) ^{[self-published]}
- Chow, Gabriel. "Diocese of Melfi-Rapolla-Venosa (Italy)". GCatholic.org. (for Chronology of Bishops) ^{[self-published]}
- Cheney, David M. "Iconium (Titular See)". Catholic-Hierarchy.org. (for Chronology of Bishops)
- Chow, Gabriel. "Titular Metropolitan See of Iconium (Turkey)". GCatholic.org. (for Chronology of Bishops)

Catholic Church titles
| Preceded by Luigi Branciforte | Bishop of Melfi e Rapolla; 1666–1671 | Succeeded by Tommaso de Franchi |
| Preceded by Joannes Mattaeus Caryophyllis | Titular Archbishop of Iconium; 1671–? | Succeeded by |
