= Adrian Grodecki =

Polish Roman Catholic prelate

Most Reverend Adrian Grodecki
- Auxiliary Bishop of Gniezno; Titular Bishop of Teodosia
- Church: Catholic Church
- Archdiocese: Archdiocese of Gniezno
- In office: 1644–1658

Orders
- Consecration: 25 July 1645

Personal details
- Died: 1658

Adrian Grodecki (died 1658) was a Roman Catholic prelate who served as Auxiliary Bishop of Gniezno (1644–1658).

On 12 December 1644, Adrian Grodecki was appointed during the papacy of Pope Innocent X as Auxiliary Bishop of Gniezno and Titular Bishop of Teodosia. on 25 July 1645 he was consecrated bishop. While bishop, he was the principal co-consecrator of Maciej Marian Kurski, Bishop of Bacău (1651).

== External links and additional sources ==
- Cheney, David M. "Teodosia (Titular See)". Catholic-Hierarchy.org. (for Chronology of Bishops) ^{[self-published]}
- Chow, Gabriel. "Titular Episcopal See of Theodosiopolis in Arcadia (Egypt)". GCatholic.org. (for Chronology of Bishops) ^{[self-published]}
