= Roman Catholic Diocese of Tropea =

Former Latin Catholic diocese in Italy

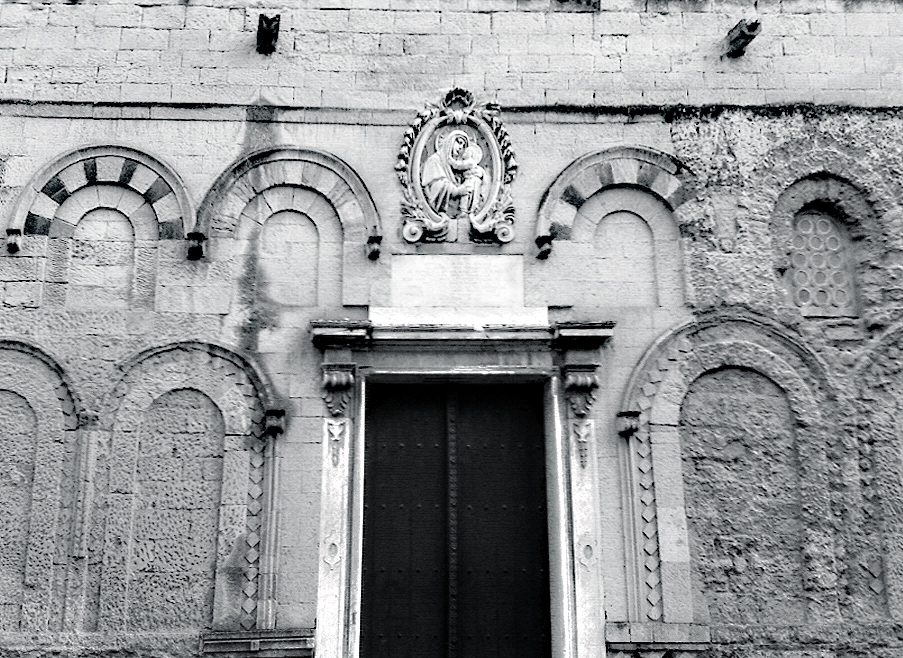
North side of cathedral of Tropea

The Diocese of Tropea (Latin: Tropiensis) was a Latin Church ecclesiastical territory or diocese located in the city of Tropea in the province of Vibo Valentia, in Calabria, Italy. On 30 September 1986, the diocese was suppressed, and its territory incorporated into the Diocese of Mileto–Nicotera–Tropea).

== History ==
By 594, a diocese was established as the Diocese of Meria or Myria. Pope Gregory I wrote to his notary in Reggio that the archdeacon Leo and the other clergy should assemble in their church of Myreia and elect a bishop, who, once consecrated, should receive the property of the church. The property was in the hands of Bishop Dono of Messana.

The Diocese of Tropea is first heard of in 649, when Bishop Joannes attended the Roman council of Pope Martin I.

The Diatyposis of the Emperor Leo VI (c. 900) lists the Greek Metropolitan of Reggio and his suffragans: the dioceses of Vibona, Tauriana, Locri, Rossano, Squillace, Tropea, Amantea, Cotrone, Cosenza, Nicotera, Bisignano, Nicastro and Cassano.

In 902, Tropea gained territory from the suppressed Diocese of Nicotera.

In 1059, the diocese lost territory to establish Diocese of Nicotera. In 1094, the diocese gained territory from the suppressed Diocese of Amantea.

In 1165, Pope Alexander III confirmed the privileges of the archbishops of Reggio Calabria, previously granted by Pope Gregory VII and Eugenius III naming Tropea as one of its suffragan dioceses.

On 15 March 1179, Pope Alexander III, in the bull "Ideo sumus", confirmed for Bishop Coridonius, all the rights and privileges belonging to the Church of Tropea. The privileges were confirmed again by Pope Innocent III in a bull of 16 November 1200.

In 1296, Bishop Jordanus Ruffus (1272–1296) established the first convent of Franciscans in Tropea.

The diocese lost territory to Archdiocese of Cosenza and Diocese of Nicastro

On 29 January 1523, Pope Clement VII confirmed the establishment of a Dominican convent in Tropea. He did so with considerable annoyance, having been presented with a fait accompli, in the face of a bull of Pope Boniface VIII, prohibiting the establishment of institutions by any of the mendicant orders without papal license. The project had been initiated by Petrus Paulus Bonsaulis and Benedictus Guoarnes of Troia, who were the patrons of the church of S. Maria de Recomodata, immediately outside the walls of the city, and of the hospital next to it; the two patrons were illegally usurping the income of the parish and the hospital, and ruling them without ecclesiastical license. After some time, their guilty consciences prompted them to make amends. When their accomplice the parish priest died, they applied to the bishop to provide a new priest, which he did, and the patrons ceased their illegal usurpations. To preserve the institutions which they had despoiled, they decided to have both the parish and the hospital turned over to some religious order, the Augustinians or the Dominicans, with the cooperation of the bishop. They approached Frater Thomas, the Vicar General of the Dominicans in Calabria, resident in Mileto, with whom they entered into an agreement, which recognized the lay patronage in the form of an annual money payment to the two patrons and their heirs, and granted the Dominicans full rights of governance as well as the right to build a convent; the agreement was registered in the offices of the bishop. Despite his outrage at the illegal proceedings, which he recited in extreme detail, Pope Clement granted his permission.

Pope Clement VII, in the Concordat of 1529, granted the Emperor Charles V and his successors the patronage over the dioceses of Reggio, Cassano, Cotrone, and Tropea. Cardinal Vincenzo Lauro (1523–1592) was a native of Tropea.

In 1600, the Jesuits founded a college in Tropea, thanks to the efforts of a patrician of Tropea, Girolamo Tauli, who travelled to Naples to negotiate with the Provincial of the Neapolitan province of the Jesuits. In 1649, there were twenty colleges in the Jesuit province of Naples, but at Tropea, though there were twelve Jesuits in residence, only one of them taught.

=== Cathedral ===
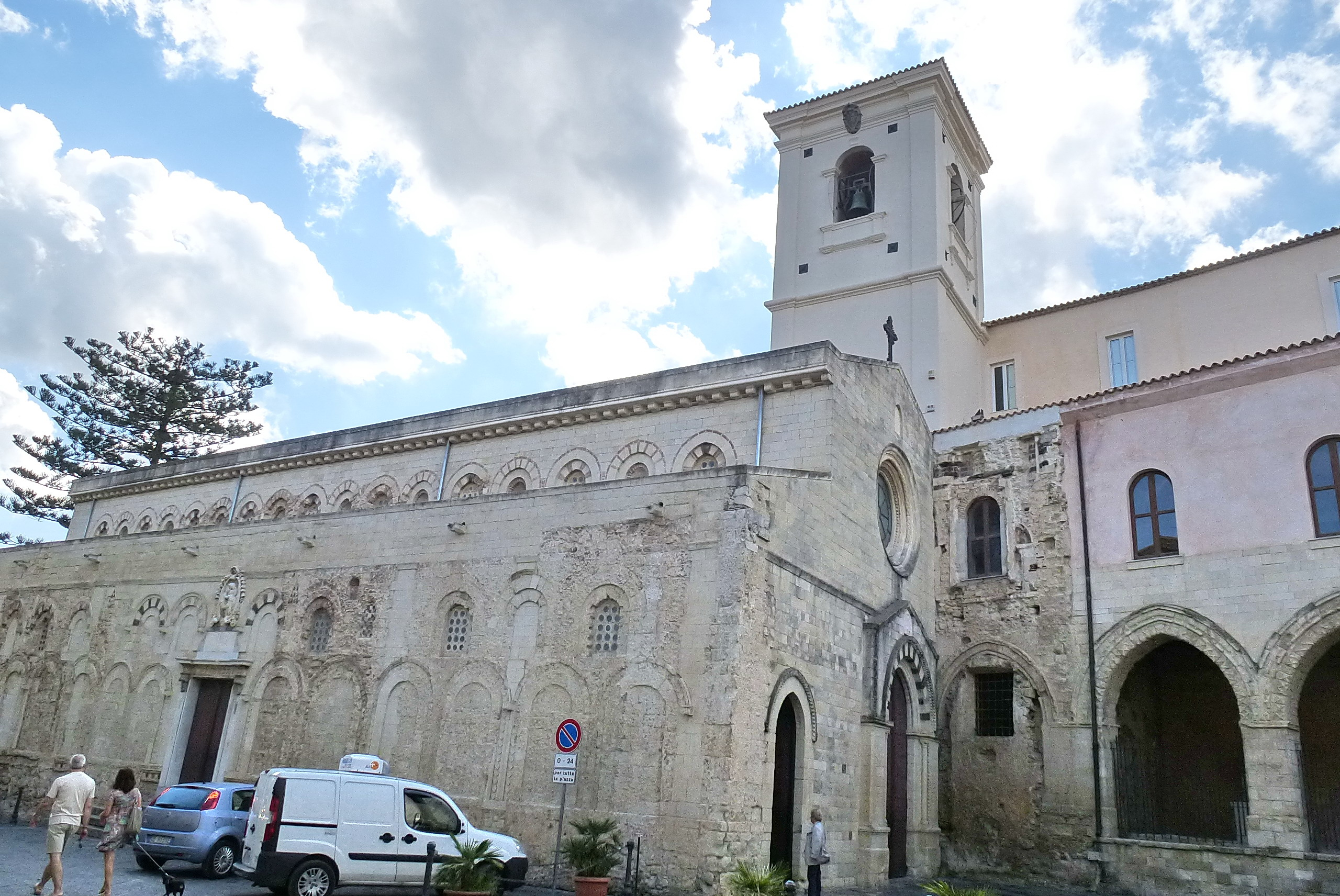
Tropea, the cathedral

The cathedral of Tropea was dedicated to the Assumption of the Virgin Mary. It was administered by a corporation, the Chapter, which included six dignities (the Dean, the Archdeacon, the Cantor, the Treasurer, the Archpriest, and the Penitentiary) and eighteen other canons.

Bishop Fabrizio Caracciolo (1615–1626) presided over a diocesan synod in 1618. In the records of the synod, he mentions that the seminary of Tropea was already in existence.

The famous Jesuit, Athanasius Kircher, happened to be in Tropea, intending to lodge at the Jesuit college, when the earthquake of 1638 took place; before his eyes, the college and many of the other buildings began falling, and he returned unsteadily to the shore and boarded his boat, while the shocks continued; he wrote of "universal ruin,' as he left the "seat of desolation". On 2 October 1687, Tropea was the center of a major Calabrian earthquake. There was a great deal of damage to structures, but no reports of loss of life. In May 1783, there were a number of earthquakes throughout Calabria. At Tropea, there were twenty deaths and sixty injuries reported. The cathedral was severely damaged. Earthquakes in 1905 and 1908 again damaged the Norman cathedral.

Bishop Felix de Paù (1751–1782) had the resources of the defunct Basilian monastery of S. Michele Archangelo transferred to the use of the diocesan seminary, following the death of the last Abbot Commendatory, Saverio Dattilo, in 1768.

On 27 June 1818, the dioceses of Nicastro and Tropea were united aeque personaliter as the diocese of Nicastro e Tropea, by Pope Pius VII.

On September 30, 1986 the diocese of Tropea was suppressed, and its territory united to the Diocese of Mileto–Nicotera–Tropea.

== Bishops of Tropea ==
Erected: 7th Century

=== to 1500 ===
- Severinus (d. 594)

.....

- Joannes (attested 649)

.....

- Theodorus (attested 679)

.....

- Theodorus (787)

.....

- Petrus
- Kalochinus (attested 1066)

.....

- Justego (attested 1094–1116)

.....

- Geruntius
- Hervaeus

.....

- Caradon (attested 1179–1194)

.....

- Riccardus (1199–1204)
- Radulfus (attested before 1215)
- Joannes (1215–1237)
- Marinus (1262–1266)
- Jordanus Ruffus (1272–1296)
- Arcadius
- Richardus
- Robertus (c. 1322–1357)
- Rolandinus de Malatichis (1357–1387) Roman Obedience?
- Nicolaus Trara (1387– ? ) Avignon Obedience
- Pavo de Griffis (1390–1410) Roman Obedience

Giovanni Dominici, O.P. (16 May 1410 – 17 Sep 1410 Resigned) Apostolic Administrator

- Niccolò d'Acciapaccio (1410– 1435)
- Giosuè Mormile (1437–1445? Resigned?)
- Petrus Balbi (1465–1479)
- Giovanni d'Itro (1479–1480)
- Giuliano Mirto Frangipani (1480–1499)

=== 1500 to 1818 ===
- Sigismondo Pappacoda (1499–1536)
- Giovanni Antonio Pappacoda (3 Nov 1536 – 1538 Died)

Innocenzo Cibo (Cybo) (1538) Administrator
Girolamo Ghinucci (1538–1541)

- Giovanni Poggio (4 Oct 1541 – 6 Feb 1556 Resigned)
- Gian Matteo Luchi (di Luca) (6 Feb 1556 – 22 Jun 1558 Died)
- Pompeo Piccolomini (26 Jan 1560 – 3 May 1562 Died)
- Juan Francisco de Aguirre (15 Nov 1564 – Jan 1566 Died)
- Felice Rossi (5 Jul 1566 – 18 Mar 1567 Died)
- Girolamo Rustici (26 Jun 1570 – 30 Mar 1593 Resigned)
- Tommaso Calvi (30 Apr 1593 – 29 Aug 1613 Died)
- Fabrizio Caracciolo (4 May 1615 – 11 Jan 1626 Died)
- Ambrosio de Córdoba, O.P. (20 Jun 1633 – 9 Jun 1638 Died)
- Benedetto Mandina, C.R. (14 Jul 1642 – 31 May 1646 Died)
- Juan Lozano (bishop), O.S.A. (17 Dec 1646 – 29 May 1656 Confirmed, Bishop of Mazara del Vallo)
- Carlo Maranta (24 Sep 1657 – 26 Jan 1664 Died)
- Luis Morales (bishop), O.S.A. (7 Feb 1667 – 10 Jan 1681 Died)
- Girolamo Borgia (12 Jan 1682 – 11 Aug 1683 Died)
- Francisco de Figueroa (bishop), O.S.A. (9 Apr 1685 – 4 Oct 1691 Died)
- Teofilo Testa, O.F.M. Obs. (25 Jun 1692 – 21 Oct 1695 Died)
- Juan Lorenzo Ibáñez de Arilla, O.E.S.A. (14 Jan 1697 – 21 Oct 1726 Died)
- Angelico Vigilini, O.F.M. Cap. (12 Apr 1728 – 16 May 1731 Died)
- Gennaro Guglielmini (17 Dec 1731 – 12 Mar 1751 Resigned)
- Felix de Paù (15 Mar 1751 – 6 Nov 1782 Died)
- Giovanni Vincenzo Monforte (18 Dec 1786 –1798)
- Gerardo Mele (29 Jan 1798 – 6 Feb 1817 Died)

Sep 30, 1986: Suppressed. Its territory and people combined in the Diocese of Mileto–Nicotera–Tropea

== See also ==
- Bishops of Nicotera e Tropea (1818–1986)

== Bibliography ==
=== Reference works for bishops ===
- Gams, Pius Bonifatius (1873). Series episcoporum Ecclesiae catholicae: quotquot innotuerunt a beato Petro apostolo (in Latin). Ratisbon: Typis et Sumptibus Georgii Josephi Manz. (Use with caution; obsolete)
- Eubel, Conradus, ed. (1913). Hierarchia catholica, Tomus 1 (in Latin) (second ed.). Münster: Libreria Regensbergiana. (in Latin)
- Eubel, Conradus, ed. (1914). Hierarchia catholica, Tomus 2 (in Latin) (second ed.). Münster: Libreria Regensbergiana.
- Eubel, Conradus; Gulik, Guilelmus (1923). Hierarchia catholica, Tomus 3 (in Latin) (second ed.). Münster: Libreria Regensbergiana.
- Gauchat, Patritius (Patrice) (1935). Hierarchia catholica IV (1592-1667) (in Latin). Münster: Libraria Regensbergiana.
- Ritzler, Remigius; Sefrin, Pirminus (1952). Hierarchia catholica medii et recentis aevi V (1667-1730) (in Latin). Patavii: Messagero di S. Antonio.
- Ritzler, Remigius; Sefrin, Pirminus (1958). Hierarchia catholica medii et recentis aevi VI (1730-1799) (in Latin). Patavii: Messagero di S. Antonio.
- Ritzler, Remigius; Sefrin, Pirminus (1968). Hierarchia Catholica medii et recentioris aevi sive summorum pontificum, S. R. E. cardinalium, ecclesiarum antistitum series... A pontificatu Pii PP. VII (1800) usque ad pontificatum Gregorii PP. XVI (1846) (in Latin). Vol. VII. Monasterii: Libr. Regensburgiana.

=== Studies ===
- Barritta, Francesco (2014). I personaggi di Tropea e dintorni. (in Italian). Roma: Youcanprint, 2014.
- Capialbi, Vito (1852). Memorie per servire alla storia della santa Chiesa tropeana. (in Italian) Napoli: N. Forcelli.
- Cappelletti, Giuseppe (1870). Le chiese d'Italia: dalla loro origine sino ai nostri giorni. (in Italian). Vol. vigesimoprimo (21). Venezia: G. Antonelli. pp. 217–225.
- De Leo, Pietro (2013). La platea della diocesi di Tropea (sec. XV). Testo latino e italiano. Meligrana, 2013.
- Galluzzi, Angelo (1933). La Cattedrale di Tropea. (in Italian). Società A. Libraria Editoriale, 1933.
- Kamp, Norbert (1975). Kirche und Monarchie im staufischen Königreich Sizilien: I. Prosopographische Grundlegung, Bistumer und Bistümer und Bischöfe des Konigreichs 1194–1266: 2. Apulien und Calabrien München: Wilhelm Fink 1975.
- Kehr, Paulus Fridolin (1975). Italia pontificia. Regesta pontificum Romanorum. (in Latin) Vol. X: Calabria–Insulae. Berlin: Weidmann.
- Lanzoni, Francesco (1927). Le diocesi d'Italia dalle origini al principio del secolo VII (an. 604) (in Italian). Rome: Biblioteca Apostolica Vaticana. pp. 331–334.
- Taccone-Gallucci, Domenico (1902). Regesti dei Romani pontefici della Calabria. (in Latin and Italian) Roma: Tip. Vaticana, 1902.
- Ughelli, Ferdinando; Coleti, Niccolo (1721). Italia Sacra Sive De Episcopis Italiae, Et Insularum adiacentium (in Latin). Vol. Tomus nonus (9). Venice: Antonio Coleti. pp. 448–472.
