= Roman Catholic Diocese of Nicotera-Tropea =

Roman Catholic diocese in Calabria, Italy

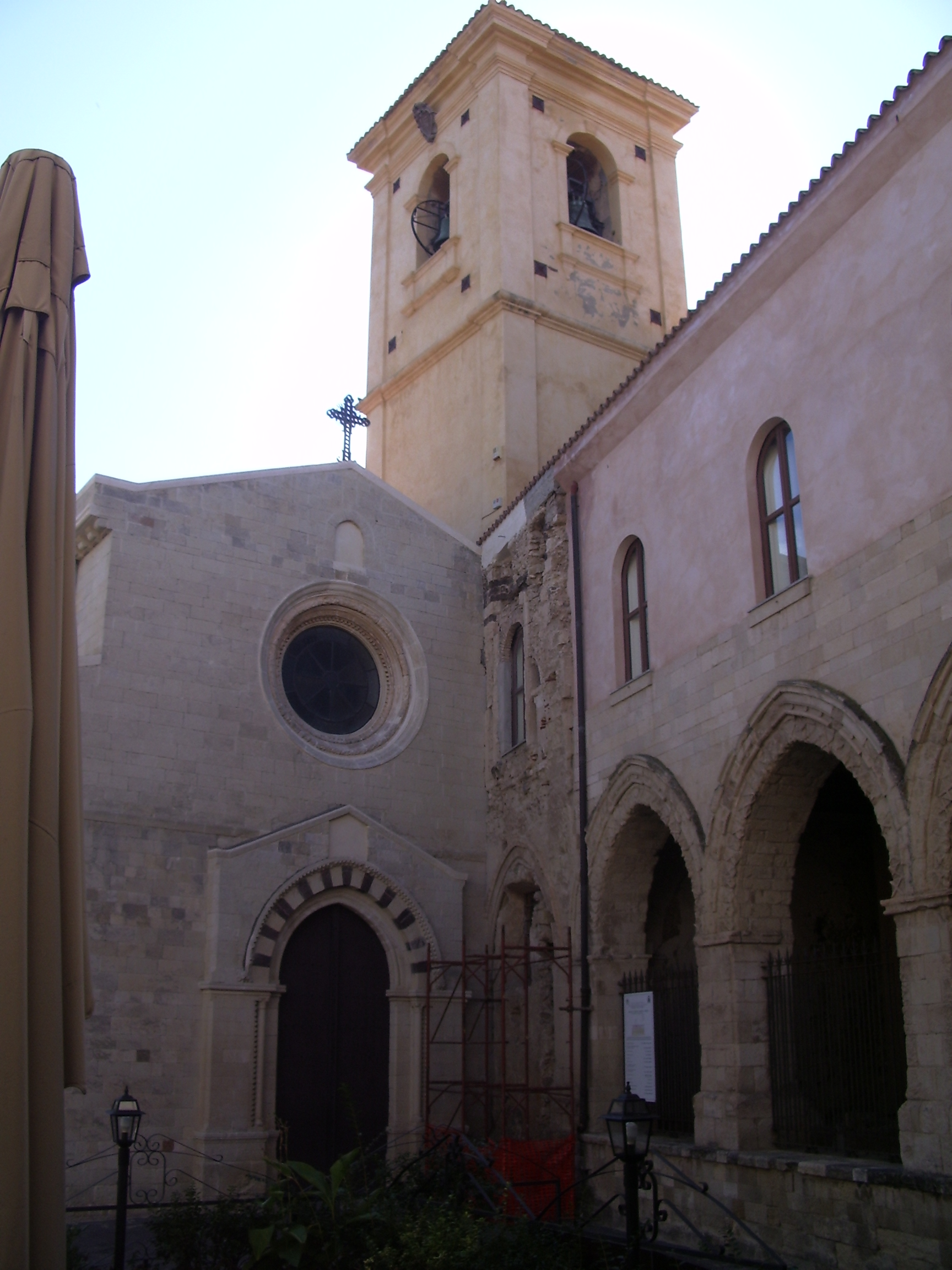
Tropea Cathedral

The former Italian Catholic diocese of Nicotera-Tropea, in Calabria, existed until 1986. In that year it was united into the diocese of Mileto, to form the diocese of Mileto-Nicotera-Tropea. It was a suffragan diocese of the archbishopric of Reggio di Calabria.

== History ==
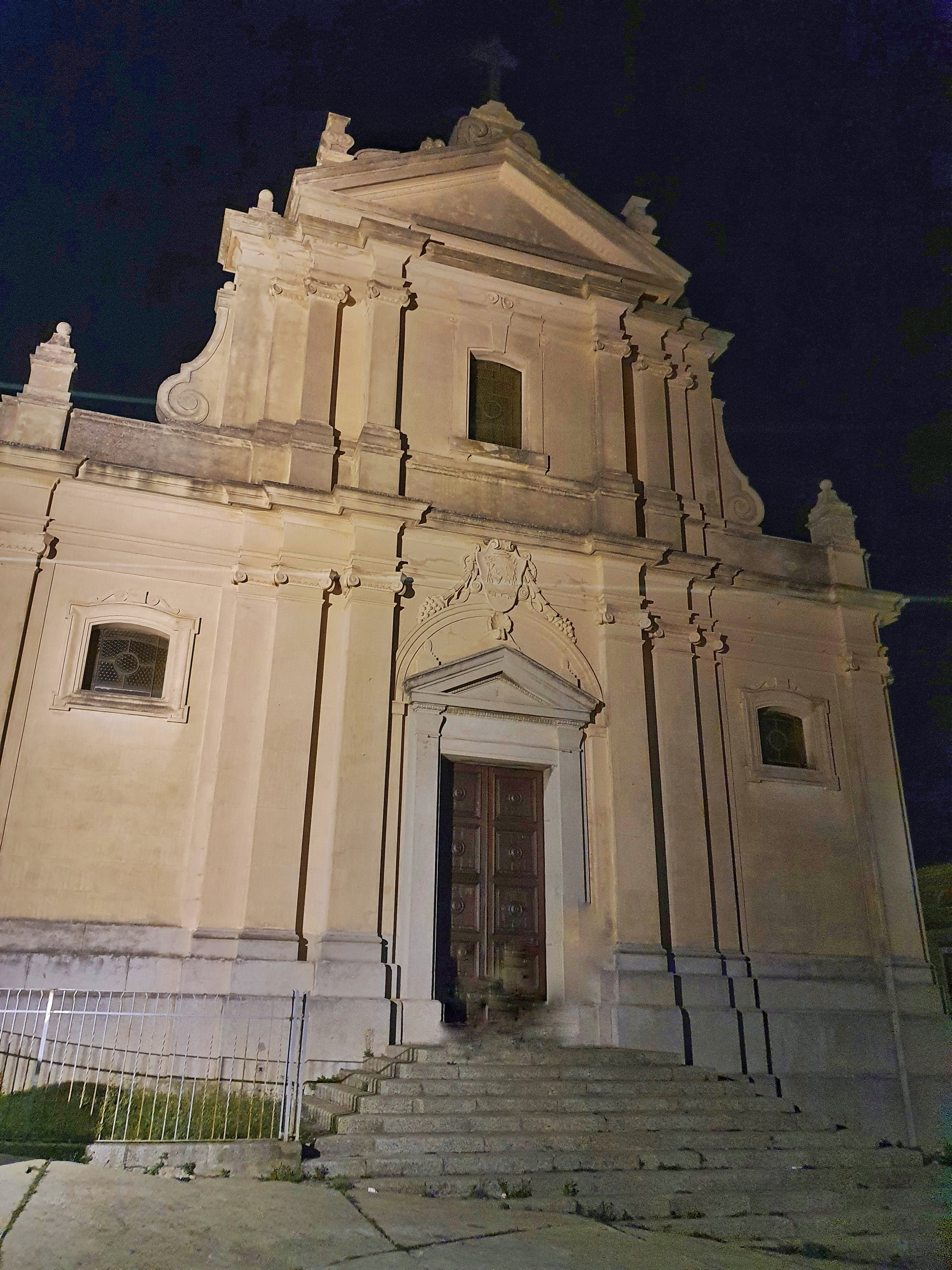
Co-cathedral of the Assumption, Nicotera

Nicotera, the ancient Medama, is in the Province of Catanzaro; it was destroyed by the earthquake of 1783.

Its first known bishop was Proculus, to whom, with others, a letter of Pope Gregory I was written in 599; the bishop had been absent from his diocese for some time, doing penance for various crimes and misdemeanors. In 596, Pope Gregory had written to the bishop of Vibo (Valentia) that the bishop of Nicotera had been ordered to do penance, and that the bishop of Vibo should appoint a priest to conduct a formal visitation of the diocese of Nicotera. The pope also wrote in 599, to the subdeacon Sabinus, his Regionarius, that Bishop Proculus, having done his penance, had returned.

The Diatyposis of the Emperor Leo VI (c. 900) lists the Greek Metropolitan of Reggio and his suffragans: the dioceses of Vibona, Tauriana, Locri, Rossano, Squillace, Tropea, Amantea, Cotrone, Cosenza, Nicotera, Bisignano, Nicastro and Cassano.

In 1304, Nicotera was deprived of its bishopric, because of the murder of its bishop, and the cathedral was reduced to the status of a parish church. Its diocesan territory was handed over to the diocese of Mileto. On 16 August 1392, Pope Boniface IX issued a bull which reestablished the diocese of Nicotera.

In 1565, Archbishop Gaspare del Fosso held a provincial synod in Reggio. Among the suffragans in attendance was Bishop Giulio Cesare de Gennaro (1542–1573) of Nicotera.

Under Bishop Luca Antonio Resta (1578–1582), the diocese of Nicotera held its first diocesan synod.

In 1638, under Bishop Carlo Pinto (1616–1644), the city was pillaged by the Ottoman Turks.

Bishop Pinto, however, held a diocesan synod. Bishop Antonio Mansi (1703–1713) held a diocesan synod. In 1772, Bishop Francesco Franco (1745–1777) presided over a diocesan synod.

The seminary of the diocese of Nicotera was established by Bishop Ercole Coppola (1651–1658)

Bishop Domenico Taccone-Gallucci (1889-1908) was a distinguished researcher, author, and historian of the churches of Calabria.

=== Post-Napoleonic restoration ===
Following the extinction of the Napoleonic Kingdom of Italy, the Congress of Vienna authorized the restoration of the Papal States and the Kingdom of Naples. Since the French occupation had seen the abolition of many Church institutions in the Kingdom, as well as the confiscation of most Church property and resources, it was imperative that Pope Pius VII and King Ferdinand IV reach agreement on restoration and restitution. Ferdinand, however, was not prepared to accept the pre-Napoleonic situation, in which Naples was a feudal subject of the papacy. Neither was he prepared to accept the large number of small dioceses in his kingdom; following French intentions, he demanded the suppression of fifty dioceses. Lengthy, detailed, and acrimonious negotiations ensued. On 17 July 1816, King Ferdinand issued a decree, in which he forbade the reception of any papal document, including without prior reception of the royal exequatur. This meant that prelates could not receive bulls of appointment, consecration, or installation without the king's permission.

A concordat was finally signed on 16 February 1818, and ratified by Pius VII on 25 February 1818. Ferdinand issued the concordat as a law on 21 March 1818. The re-erection of the dioceses of the kingdom and the ecclesiastical provinces took more than three years. The right of the king to nominate the candidate for a vacant bishopric was recognized, as in the Concordat of 1741, subject to papal confirmation (preconisation). On 27 June 1818, Pius VII issued the bull De Ulteriore in which the metropolitan archdiocese of Reggio Calabria was restored, and among its suffragans were included the dioceses of Nicotera and Tropea. The dioceses of Nicotera and Tropea, however, were united aeque personaliter, with the bishop of the two separate dioceses to reside in Tropea.

=== Diocesan reorganization ===
The Second Vatican Council (1962–1965), in order to ensure that all Catholics received proper spiritual attention, decreed the reorganization of the diocesan structure of Italy and the consolidation of small and struggling dioceses. It also recommended the abolition of anomalous units such as exempt territorial prelatures. These considerations applied to Mileto and to Nicotero e Tropea.

On 18 February 1984, the Vatican and the Italian State signed a new and revised concordat. Based on the revisions, a set of Normae was issued on 15 November 1984, which was accompanied in the next year, on 3 June 1985, by enabling legislation. According to the agreement, the practice of having one bishop govern two separate dioceses at the same time, aeque personaliter, was abolished. Instead, the Vatican continued consultations which had begun under Pope John XXIII for the merging of small dioceses, especially those with personnel and financial problems, into one combined diocese. On 30 September 1986, Pope John Paul II ordered that the dioceses of Mileto, Nicotero and Tropea be merged into one diocese with one bishop, with the Latin title Dioecesis Miletensis-Nicotriensis-Tropiensis. The seat of the diocese was to be in Mileto, and the cathedral of Mileto was to serve as the cathedral of the merged dioceses. The cathedrals in Nicotero and Tropea were to become co-cathedrals, and the cathedral Chapters were each to be a Capitulum Concathedralis. There was to be only one diocesan Tribunal, in Mileto, and likewise one seminary, one College of Consultors, and one Priests' Council. The territory of the new diocese was to include the territory of the former dioceses of Mileto, Nicotero and Tropea.

== Bishops of Nicotera ==
Erected: 6th Century
Latin Name: Nicotriensis
Metropolitan: Archdiocese of Reggio Calabria

=== to 1500 ===
- Proclus (attested 596)

...

- Sergius (attested 787)

...

- Caesareus (attested 884)

...

- Pellegrinus (attested 1173)

...

- [Anonymous] (attested 1304)

Diocese suppressed (1304–1392)

- Jacobus d'Ursa da S. Angelo (attested 1392–1405)
- Petrus (attested c. 1415)
- Clemente da Napoli, O.Carm. (1415–1423)
- Floridassius Suprandus (Seriprando) (1423–1443/1444)
- Giovanni (1444–1452)
- Francesco Brancia, O.Cist. (14 Jun 1452–c.1479)

Pietro Barbo (1462)

- Nicolaus Guidiccioni (1479–1487)
- Antonius Sicardus (Lucido) (1487–1490)
- Arduino Pantaleoni (1490–c.1517)

=== 1500 to 1818 ===
Giulio Cesare Gennaro (1517–1523?) Administrator
Giulio Cesare Gennaro (1523– ? ) Bishop-elect
Andrea della Valle ( ? –1528?)
Pompeo Colonna (1528–1530) Administrator

- Princivalle Gennaro (1530–1539)
- Camillo Gennaro (1539–1542)
- Giulio Cesare de Gennaro (1542–1573)
- Leonardo Liparola (1573–1578)
- Luca Antonio Resta (1578–1582)
- Ottaviano Capece (21 May 1582 – 1616 Died)
- Carlo Pinto (1616 Succeeded – 26 Jul 1644 Died)
- Camillo Baldi (1645–1650)
- Lodovico Centofiorini (2 May 1650 – 1651 Died)
- Ercole Coppola (22 May 1651 – 1658 Died)
- Francesco Cribario (6 May 1658 – 3 Mar 1667 Died)
- Giovanni Francesco Biancolella (22 Aug 1667 – 5 Feb 1669 Died)
- Francesco Arrigua, O.M. (6 Oct 1670 – 12 Nov 1690 Died)
- Bartolomeo Riberi, O. de M. (12 Nov 1691 – 8 Dec 1702 Died)
- Antonio Manso, O.M. (1 Oct 1703 – Nov 1713 Died)
- Gennaro Mattei, O.M. (10 Jan 1718 – 25 Jan 1725 Died)
- Alberto Gualtieri, O.F.M. Disc. (21 Feb 1725 – Oct 1726 Died)
- Paolo Collia, O.M. (23 Dec 1726 – 27 Jul 1735 Died)
- Francesco De Novellis (2 Dec 1735 – 27 Jan 1738 Appointed, Bishop of Sarno)
- Eustachius Entreri, O.M. (3 Mar 1738 – 11 Mar 1745 Died)
- Francesco Franco (10 May 1745 – 20 Apr 1777 Died)
- Francesco Antonio Attaffi (23 Jun 1777 – 4 Mar 1784 Died)
- Giuseppe Marra (27 Feb 1792 Confirmed – 16 Jan 1816 Died)

== Bishops of Nicotera e Tropea ==
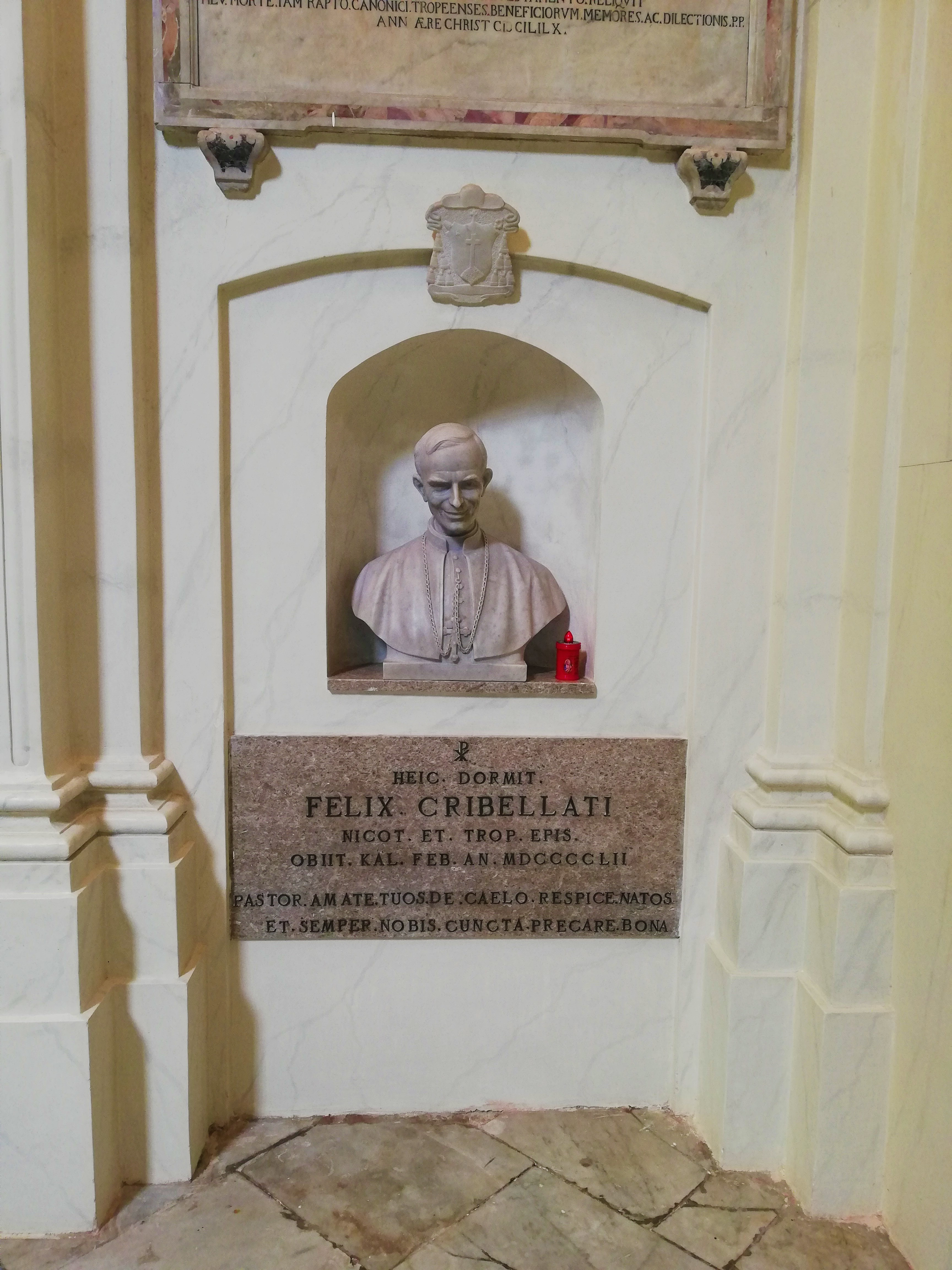
Grave of Felice Cribellati

United: 27 June 1818 with the Diocese of Tropea
Latin Name: Nicotriensis et Tropiensis
Metropolitan: Archdiocese of Reggio Calabria

- Giovanni Battista Tomasuolo (21 Dec 1818 Confirmed - 21 Jun 1824 Resigned)
- Nicola Antonio Montiglia (27 Sep 1824 Confirmed - 30 Nov 1826 Died)
- Mariano Bianco (9 Apr 1827 Confirmed - 30 Sep 1831 Confirmed, Archbishop of Amalfi)
- Michele Franchini (2 Jul 1832 Confirmed - 24 May 1854 Died)
- Filippo de Simone (23 Mar 1855 Confirmed - 13 Dec 1889 Died)
- Domenico Taccone-Gallucci (13 Dec 1889 Succeeded - 21 Jul 1908 Resigned)
- Giuseppe Maria Leo (23 Jun 1909 - 17 Jan 1920 Appointed, Archbishop of Trani e Barletta e Nazareth e Bisceglie)
- Felice Cribellati, F.D.P. (9 Jun 1921 - 1 Feb 1952 Died)
- Agostino Saba (25 Aug 1953 - 16 Mar 1961 Appointed, Archbishop of Sassari)
- Giuseppe Bonfigioli (29 Mar 1961 - 9 Nov 1963 Appointed, Coadjutor Archbishop of Siracusa)
- Vincenzo De Chiara (11 Jul 1973 - 5 Mar 1979 Retired)
- Domenico Tarcisio Cortese, O.F.M. (15 Jun 1979 - 30 Sep 1986 Appointed, Bishop of Mileto-Nicotera-Tropea)

30 September 1986 - Suppressed and United with the Diocese of Mileto to form the Diocese of Mileto-Nicotera-Tropea

== See also ==
- Roman Catholic Diocese of Tropea

== Bibliography ==
=== Reference works for bishops ===
- Gams, Pius Bonifatius (1873). Series episcoporum Ecclesiae catholicae: quotquot innotuerunt a beato Petro apostolo (in Latin). Ratisbon: Typis et Sumptibus Georgii Josephi Manz. p. 906. (Use with caution; obsolete)
- Eubel, Conradus, ed. (1913). Hierarchia catholica, Tomus 1 (in Latin) (second ed.). Münster: Libreria Regensbergiana. (in Latin)
- Eubel, Conradus, ed. (1914). Hierarchia catholica, Tomus 2 (in Latin) (second ed.). Münster: Libreria Regensbergiana.
- Eubel, Conradus; Gulik, Guilelmus (1923). Hierarchia catholica, Tomus 3 (in Latin) (second ed.). Münster: Libreria Regensbergiana.
- Gauchat, Patritius (Patrice) (1935). Hierarchia catholica IV (1592-1667) (in Latin). Münster: Libraria Regensbergiana.
- Ritzler, Remigius; Sefrin, Pirminus (1952). Hierarchia catholica medii et recentis aevi V (1667-1730) (in Latin). Patavii: Messagero di S. Antonio.
- Ritzler, Remigius; Sefrin, Pirminus (1958). Hierarchia catholica medii et recentis aevi VI (1730-1799) (in Latin). Patavii: Messagero di S. Antonio.
- Ritzler, Remigius; Sefrin, Pirminus (1968). Hierarchia Catholica medii et recentioris aevi sive summorum pontificum, S. R. E. cardinalium, ecclesiarum antistitum series... A pontificatu Pii PP. VII (1800) usque ad pontificatum Gregorii PP. XVI (1846) (in Latin). Vol. VII. Monasterii: Libr. Regensburgiana.

=== Studies ===
- Cappelletti, Giuseppe (1870). Le chiese d'Italia: dalla loro origine sino ai nostri giorni. (in Italian). Vol. vigesimoprimo (21). Venezia: G. Antonelli. pp. 213-216.
- Kehr, Paulus Fridolin (1975). Italia pontificia. Regesta pontificum Romanorum. (in Latin) Vol. X: Calabria–Insulae. Berlin: Weidmann. pp. 45-46.
- Lanzoni, Francesco (1927). Le diocesi d'Italia dalle origini al principio del secolo VII (an. 604) (in Italian). Rome: Biblioteca Apostolica Vaticana. pp. 331–334.
- Taccone-Gallucci, Domenico (1902). Regesti dei Romani pontefici della Calabria. (in Latin and Italian) Roma: Tip. Vaticana, 1902.
- Taccone-Gallucci, Domenico (1904). Monografia delle diocesi di Nicotera e Tropea (in Italian). Reggio Calabria 1904.
- Torelli, Felice (1848), La chiave del concordato dell'anno 1818. (in Italian and Latin) Vol. I, second edition (Naples: Fibreno 1848)
- Ughelli, Ferdinando; Coleti, Niccolo (1721). Italia Sacra Sive De Episcopis Italiae, Et Insularum adiacentium (in Latin). Vol. Tomus nonus (9). Venice: Antonio Coleti. pp. 412–417.
