= San Francesco =

San Francesco may refer to:

- San Francesco d'Assisi (c. 1182–1226), Italian Catholic friar, deacon, philosopher, mystic, and preacher
- San Francesco al Campo, a municipality in the Metropolitan City of Turin, Piedmont, Italy

== Churches in Italy ==
- San Francesco, Acquasparta, Umbria
- San Francesco, Acqui Terme, Piedmont
- San Francesco, Andria, Apulia
- San Francesco, Atri, Abruzzo
- San Francesco, Barga, Tuscany
- San Francesco, Bologna, Emilia-Romagna
- San Francesco, Cagli, Marche
- San Francesco, Canicattì, Sicily
- San Francesco, Cingoli, Marche
- San Francesco, Civitanova Marche, Marche
- San Francesco, Deruta, Umbria
- San Francesco, Fanano, Emilia-Romagna
- San Francesco, Ferrara, Emilia-Romagna
- San Francesco, Fidenza, Emilia-Romagna
- San Francesco, Grosseto, Tuscany
- San Francesco, Gubbio, Tuscany
- San Francesco, Larino, Molise
- San Francesco, Lucca, Tuscany
- San Francesco, Matelica, Marche
- San Francesco, Mondavio, Marche
- San Francesco, Montefalco, Umbria
- San Francesco, Modena, Emilia-Romagna
- San Francesco, Mantua, Lombardy
- San Francesco, Narni, Umbria
- San Francesco, Rieti, Lazio
- San Francesco, Sarzana, Liguria
- San Francesco, Treia, Marche
- San Francesco, Orvieto, Umbria
- San Francesco, Pescia, Tuscany
- San Francesco, Pienza, Tuscany
- San Francesco, Pievebovigliana, Marche
- San Francesco, Pioraco, Marche
- San Francesco, Prato, Tuscany
- San Francesco, Vetralla, Lazio
- San Francesco, Viterbo, Lazio
- San Francesco, Urbania, Marche

== See also ==
- Basilica of Saint Francis of Assisi, a church in Assisi, Umbria, Italy
- Feast of Saints Francis and Catherine
- St. Francis (disambiguation)
