= Tuccio =

Tuccio may refer to:

- Punta Beppe Tuccio Lighthouse, an active lighthouse located on the north eastern tip of the island of Linosa, Italy
- Daniel Tuccio, Peruvian-American television reporter/news anchor
- Paolo di Mariano di Tuccio Taccone (or Paolo Tuccone), Italian early Renaissance sculptor and goldsmith
- Tuccio d'Andria (Late 15th century), Italian painter
- Tuccio Musumeci (born 1934), Italian actor and comedian
