= San Nicola di Myra, Andria =

Catholic Church in Andria, Italy

San Nicola di Myra is a Baroque-style, former Roman Catholic church located in the town of Andria, province of Barletta-Andria-Trani, Apulia, Italy.

== History ==
The church at the site is documented since 1104, when the bishop granted the neighborhood of Trimoggia its own parish. It was initially refurbished in 1349 by Bertrando del Balzo, husband of Beatrice D’Angiò. In 1657, Duke Fabrizio IV Carafa patronized construction of the main altar, replacing one that had been placed by his ancestor, Ettore II Carafa.

The facade of the church was built in a late-baroque and early neoclassical style. The interior has a number of canvases by or Francesco or Vito Calò a pupil of Corrado Giaquinto.
