= Greccio =

- Comune
- Comune di Greccio
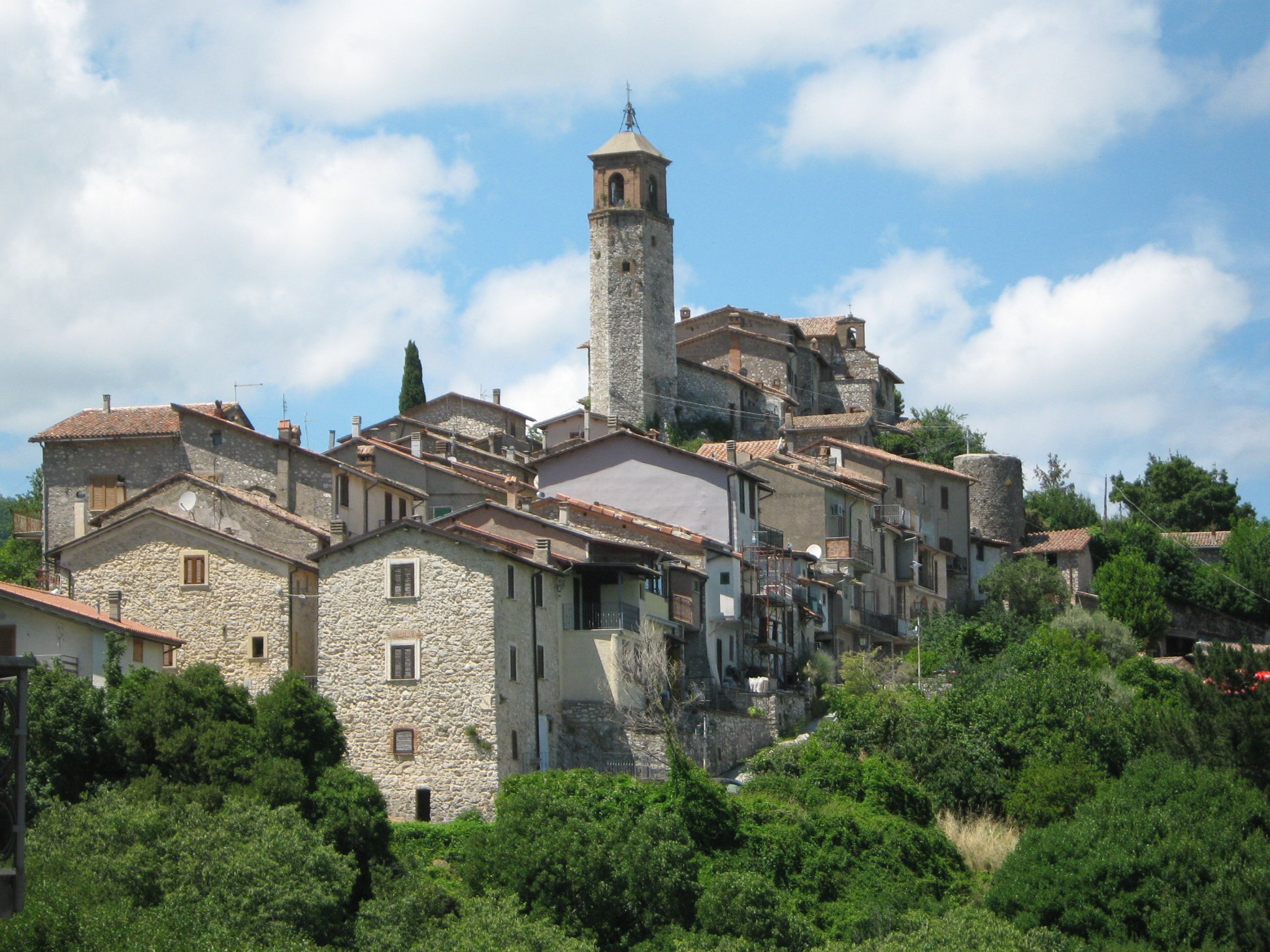
- view of Greccio

- Coat of arms

- Location within Italy Location within Lazio
- Coordinates: 42°27′N 12°45′E
- Country: Italy
- Region: Lazio
- Province: Rieti (RI)
- Frazioni: Limiti di Greccio, Sellecchia, Spinacceto

Government
  - Mayor: Emiliano Fabi

Area
  - Total: 17 km^{2} (6.6 sq mi)
- Elevation: 705 m (2,313 ft)

Population (2008)
  - Total: 1,529
  - Density: 90/km^{2} (230/sq mi)
- Time zone: UTC+1 (CET)
  - Summer (DST): UTC+2 (CEST)
- Postal code: 02040
- Dialing code: 0746

Greccio (pronounced [ˈɡrett͡ʃo]) is an old hilltown and comune of the province of Rieti in the Italian region of Lazio, overhanging the Rieti Valley on a spur of the Monti Sabini, a sub-range of the Apennines, about 16 kilometres (10 miles) by road northwest of Rieti, the nearest large town.

It is one of I Borghi più belli d'Italia ("The most beautiful villages of Italy"). The town hall of the comune is in the frazione of Limiti di Greccio.

Greccio was the place where, in December 1223, Saint Francis of Assisi devised the first living Nativity scene (in Italian: presepe). The Nativity scene tradition continues there to this day, and a memorial of Saint Francis, the Sanctuary of Greccio, may be visited.

== Etymology ==
The first hypothesis on the etymology of the town's name is linked to the settlement of ancient Greek colonists in the same place where Greccio now stands. Hence the name, according to this hypothesis, Grecia, Grece, Grecce and finally Greccio.

According to other hypotheses, the name of Greccio used during the Middle Ages, "curtis de Greze", derives from "curtis", i.e. from a self-sufficient medieval economic organization managed by a lord, and from "greze" or "grezze" i.e. crushed stone (in Italian, pietre grezze), which recalls the presence of a stone quarry used at the time. According to this hypothesis, the name Greccio does not therefore derive from the ancient presence of Greek colonists.

== History ==
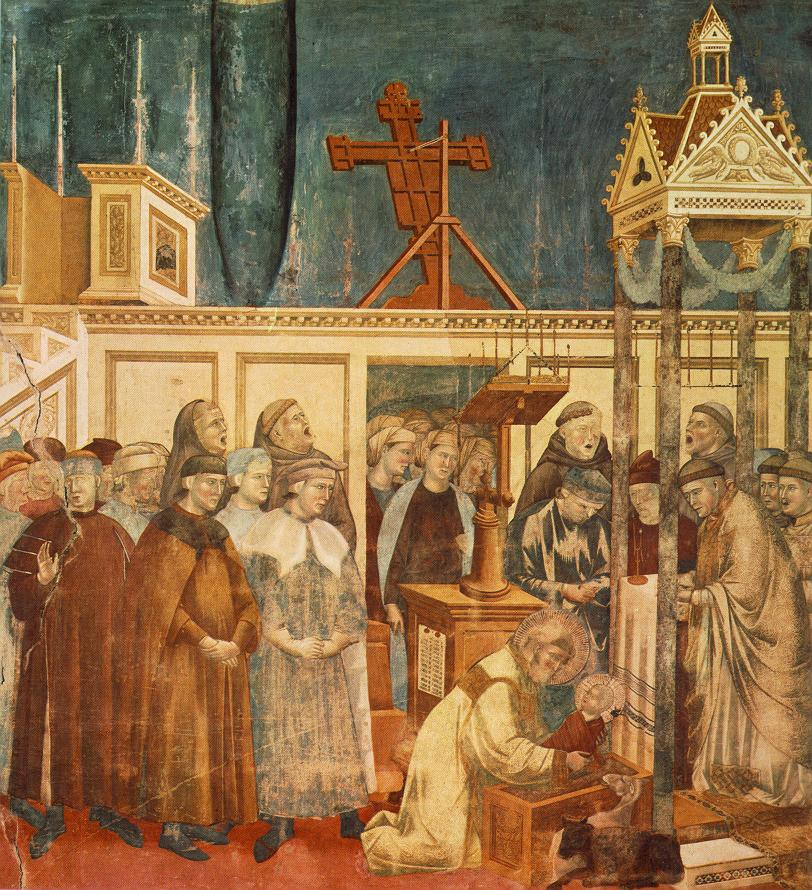
St. Francis at Greccio by Giotto, 1295

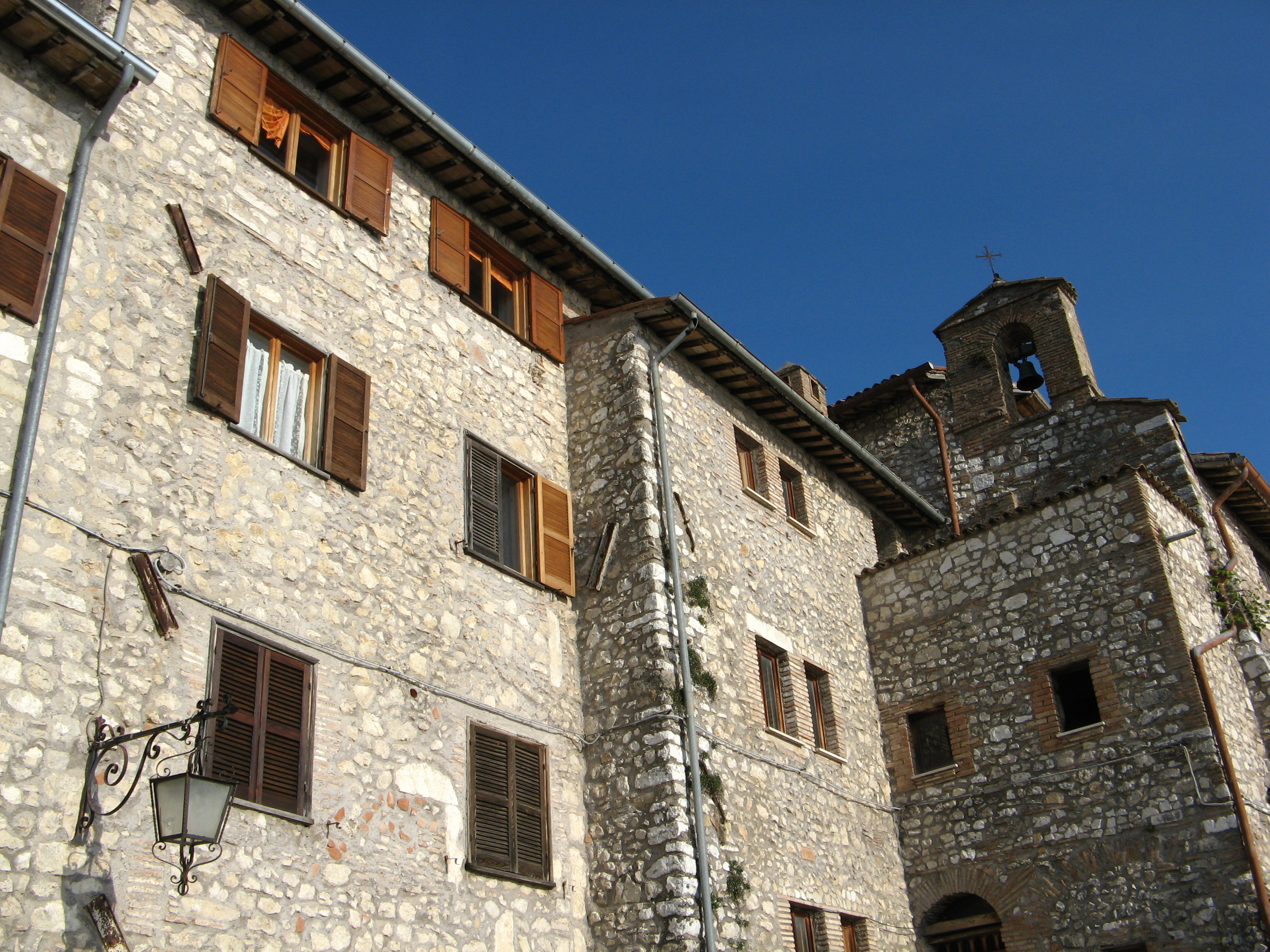
View of the town

Modern Greccio, which is of medieval origin, was founded on lands of ancient Greek colonization, in a place where there was, in ancient times, a colony founded by colonists from Magna Graecia. They had fled or were exiled from their homeland as a result of war.

The earliest records of Greccio date back to the 10th and 11th centuries with the name of "curtis de Greze". The Benedictine Monk Gregory of Catino (1062–1133) refers to the town of "Grecciae" in his work "Summary Farfense". From the remains of the ancient buildings, it shows that Greccio became a fortified medieval castle surrounded by walls and protected by a six towers fortress.

In documents from the 11th century, the toponym of Greccio is cited with many variations until 1091, when the name "Grecciae", from which the current name derives, seems to spread; the community also experienced a fair amount of development, favored by the abundance of flat arable land and good pastures.

During the struggle with neighboring cities, the castle was destroyed in 1242 by the troops of Frederick II. They had a difficult history until 1799 when the town was destroyed and looted by the Napoleonic army. The town was called for the first time with its current name "Greccio" around 1720.

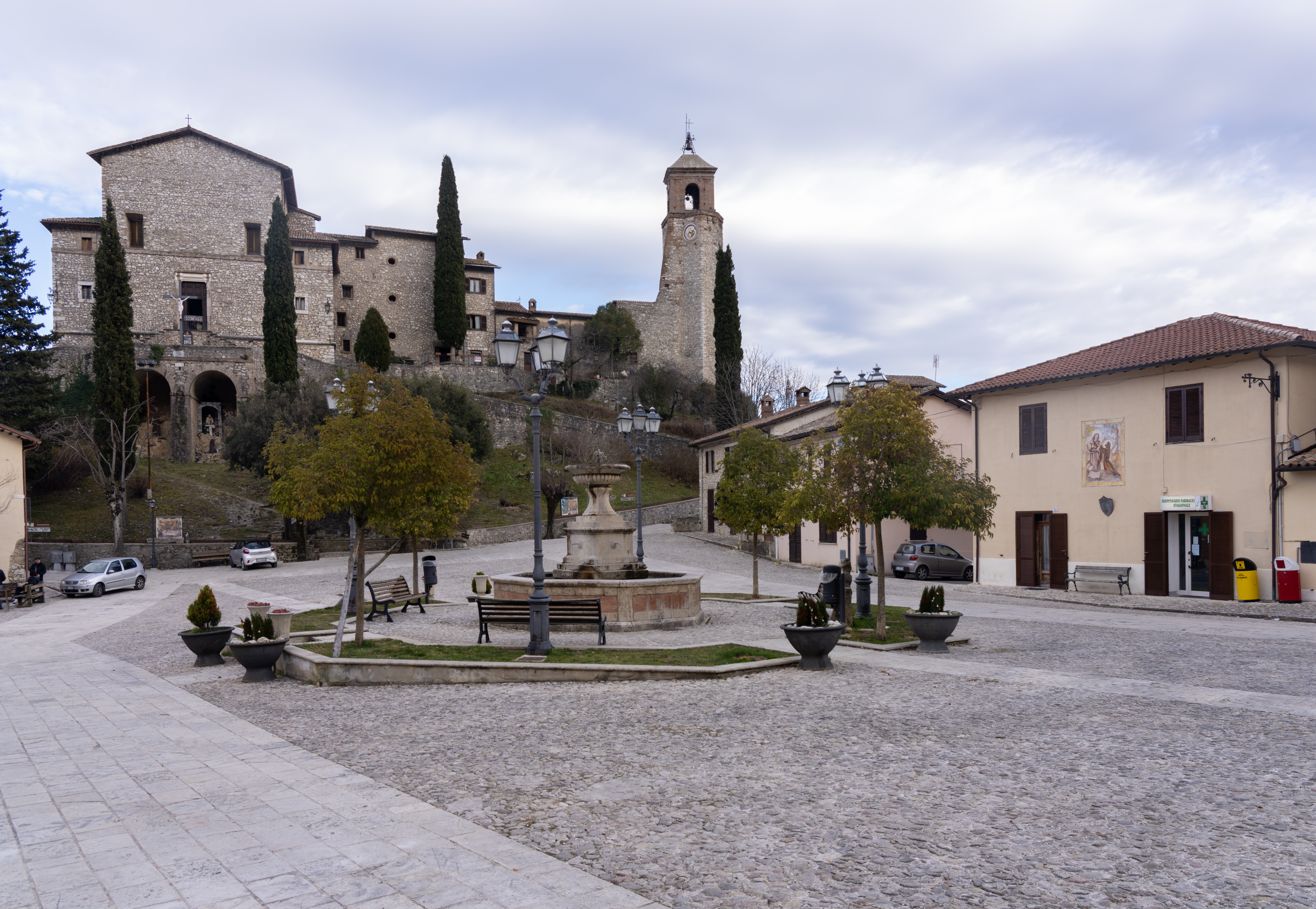
Main piazza in Greccio

Greccio was the place where, in December 1223, Saint Francis of Assisi devised the first living Nativity scene (in Italian: presepe). Francis' 1223 living nativity scene is commemorated on the calendars of the Catholic, Lutheran and Anglican liturgical calendars, and its creation is described by Saint Bonaventure in his Life of Saint Francis of Assisi c. 1260.

Saint Francis' manger scene is said to have been enacted at Christmas 1223 in a cave near the Sanctuary of Greccio. The very small chapel where it is said to have taken place survives. The painting over its altar, and others before 1400, by Giotto at the Assisi Lower Church, and by Antonio Vite in Pistoia, depict Saint Francis kneeling and placing a small baby into a chest-like manger. Giotto adds a miniature ox and ass. The Nativity scene tradition continues there to this day, and a memorial of Saint Francis, the Sanctuary of Greccio, may be visited.

== Main sights ==
=== Sanctuary of Greccio ===
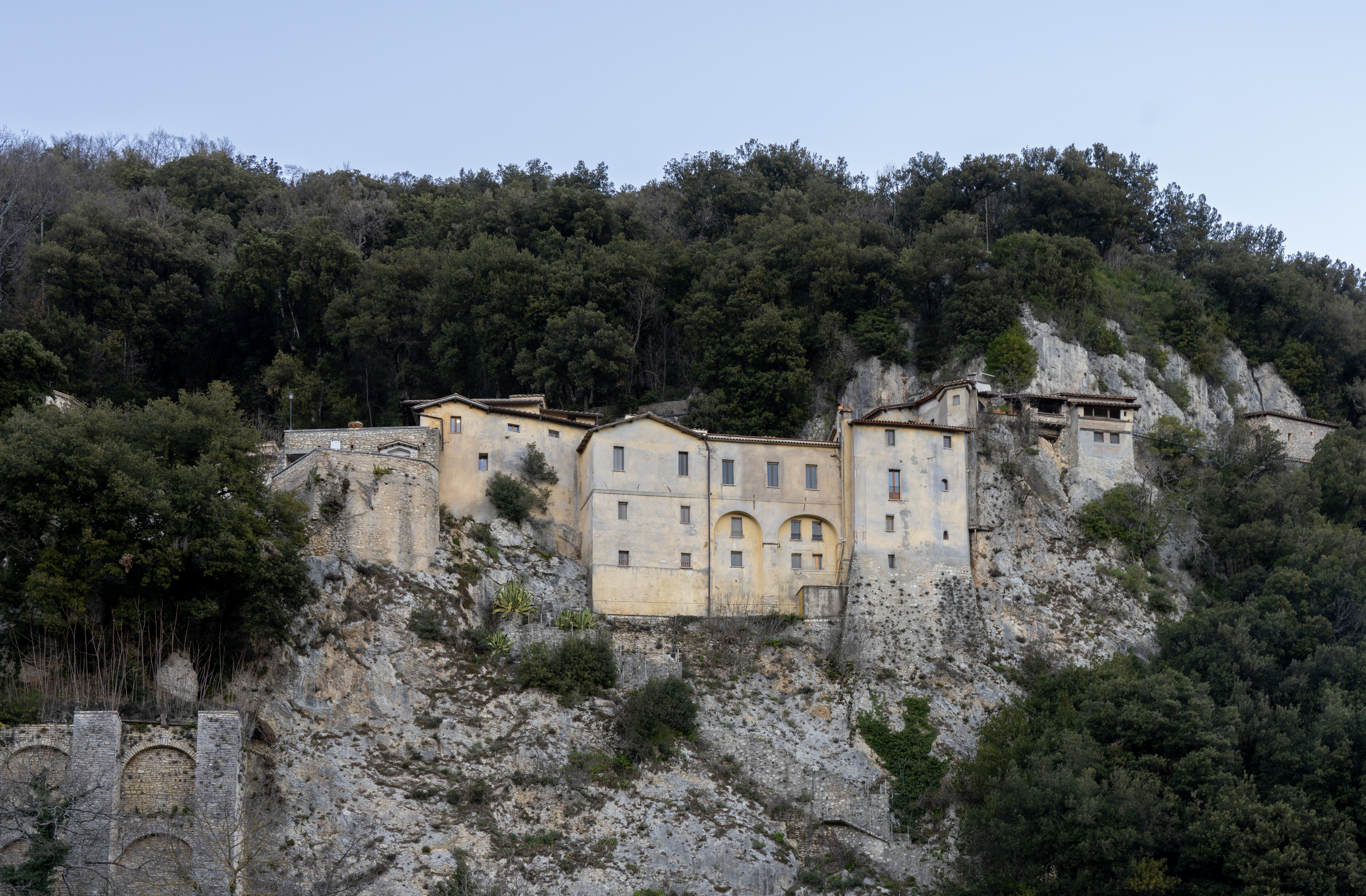
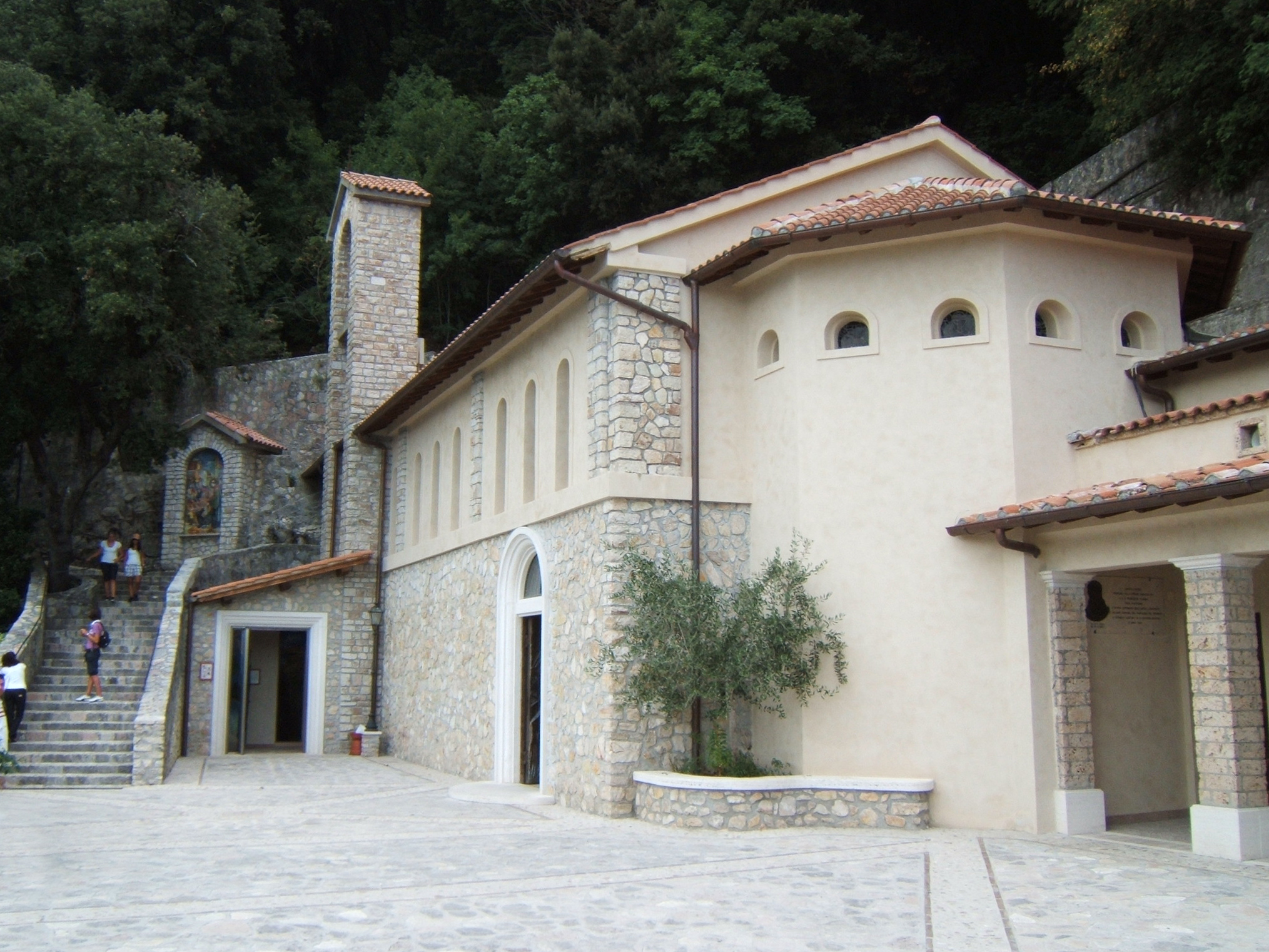
The Sanctuary of Greccio

The chapel of the first living nativity scene located in the Sanctuary of Greccio

The Hermitage of Greccio Sanctuary (Italian: Santuario Eremo di Greccio) is one of the four shrines erected by Saint Francis of Assisi in the Sacred Valley, along with the Sanctuary of Fonte Colombo, the Sanctuary of the Forest, and the convent of Poggio Bustone. Francis presented the first living Nativity scene in a nearby cave in December 1223.

Inside there are frescoes modern and original chapel of the saint carved in the rock. Francis, recalling a visit he had made years before to Bethlehem, resolved to create the manger he had seen there. The ideal spot was a cave in nearby Greccio. He would find a baby, hay upon which to lay him, an ox, and an ass to stand beside the manger. Word went out to the people of the town.

At the appointed time, the townspeople arrived carrying torches and candles. One of the friars began celebrating Mass while Francis himself gave the sermon. His biographer, Thomas of Celano, recalls that Francis stood before the manger, overwhelmed with love and filled with a wonderful happiness. For Francis, the simple celebration was meant to recall the hardships Jesus suffered even as an infant, a savior who chose to become poor for our sake, a truly human Jesus. The Sanctuary of Greccio may be visited.

=== Other architectures ===
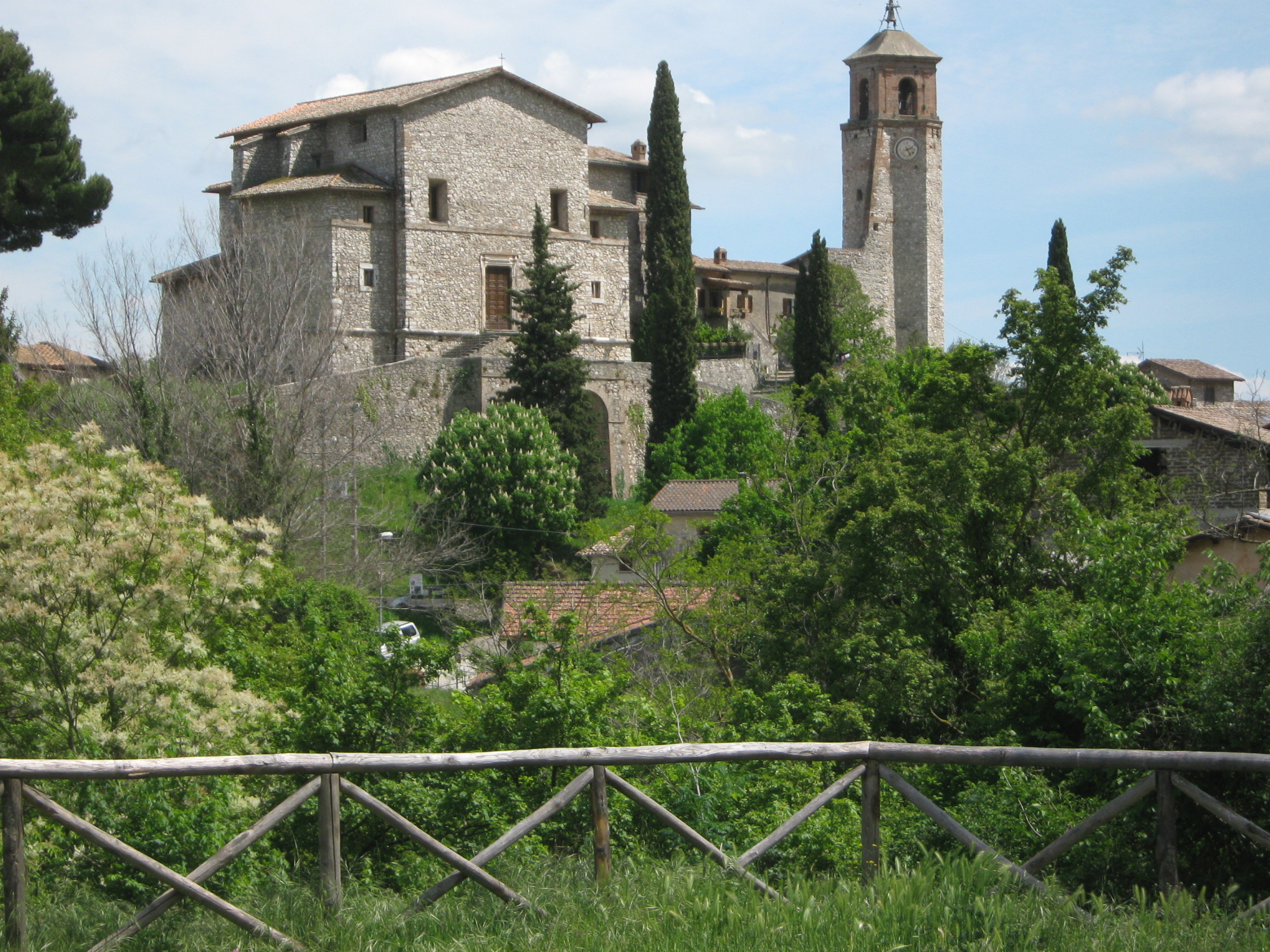
The church of San Michele Archangel

The medieval town that preserves part of the pavement of the old castle (11th century) and three of the six towers. The parish church of San Michele Archangel is located next to the bell tower on top of a flight of steps and dates back to the 11th century. The church was built over a part of the castle, and was destroyed and rebuilt several times. The church has a Nave and side chapels. Two of the side chapels, dedicated to St. Anthony of Padua and Our Lady Immaculate, have paintings and frescoes of the 15th and 16th century, and stucco decorations created in 1636. Remarkable from an artistic point of view are the baptismal font, the main altar, a gilded silver chalice and a monstrance, all dating back to the 16th century. In the square, there is the Church of Santa Maria del Giglio from the 14th century. This church also is a single aisle or Nave. It has a central altar and two side altars, stucco Roman school with influences of Carlo Fontana, and tempera paintings dated to the early 15th century. The high altar preserves a fresco which represents the Virgin and Child with Angels.

=== Museums ===
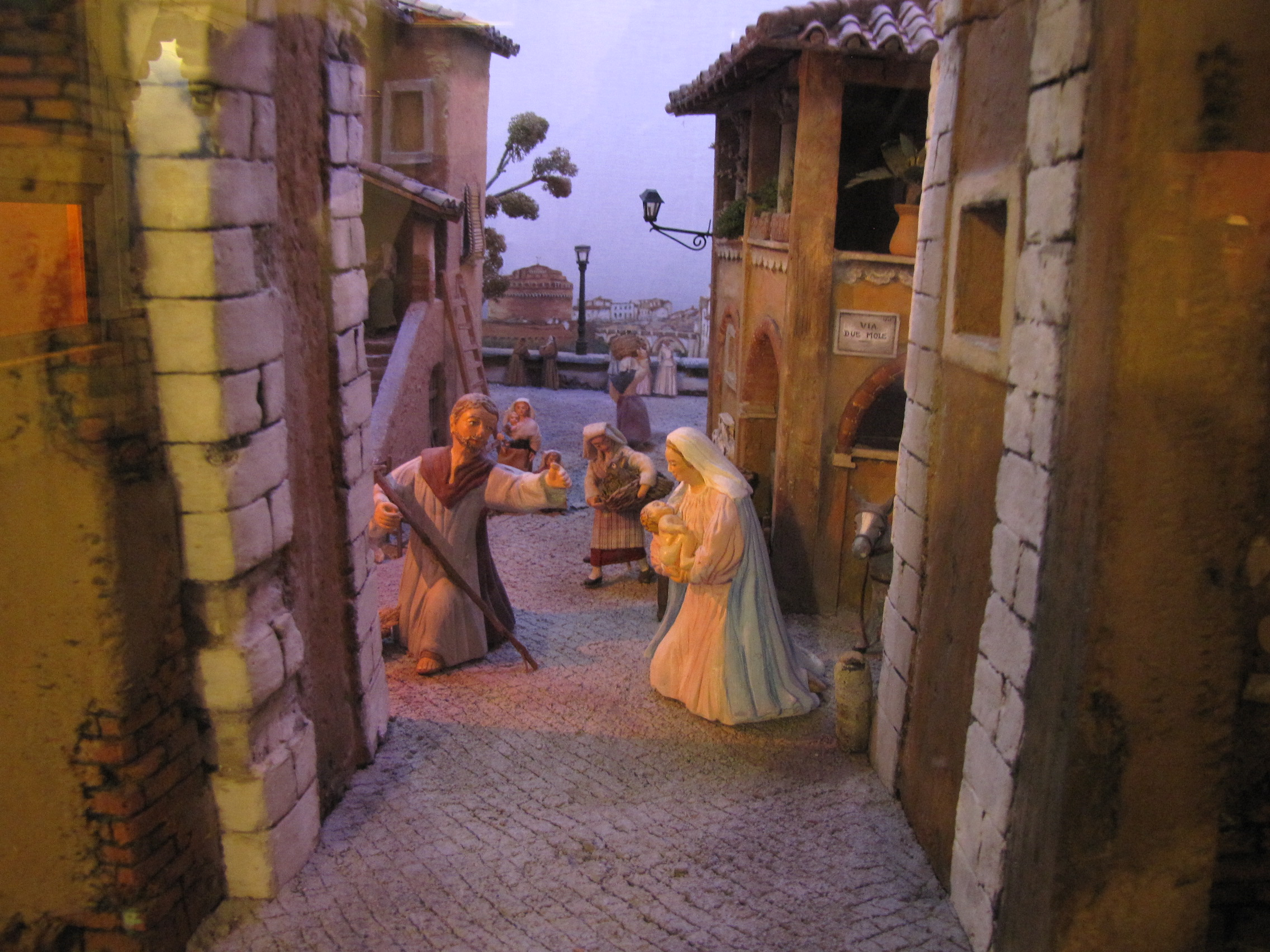
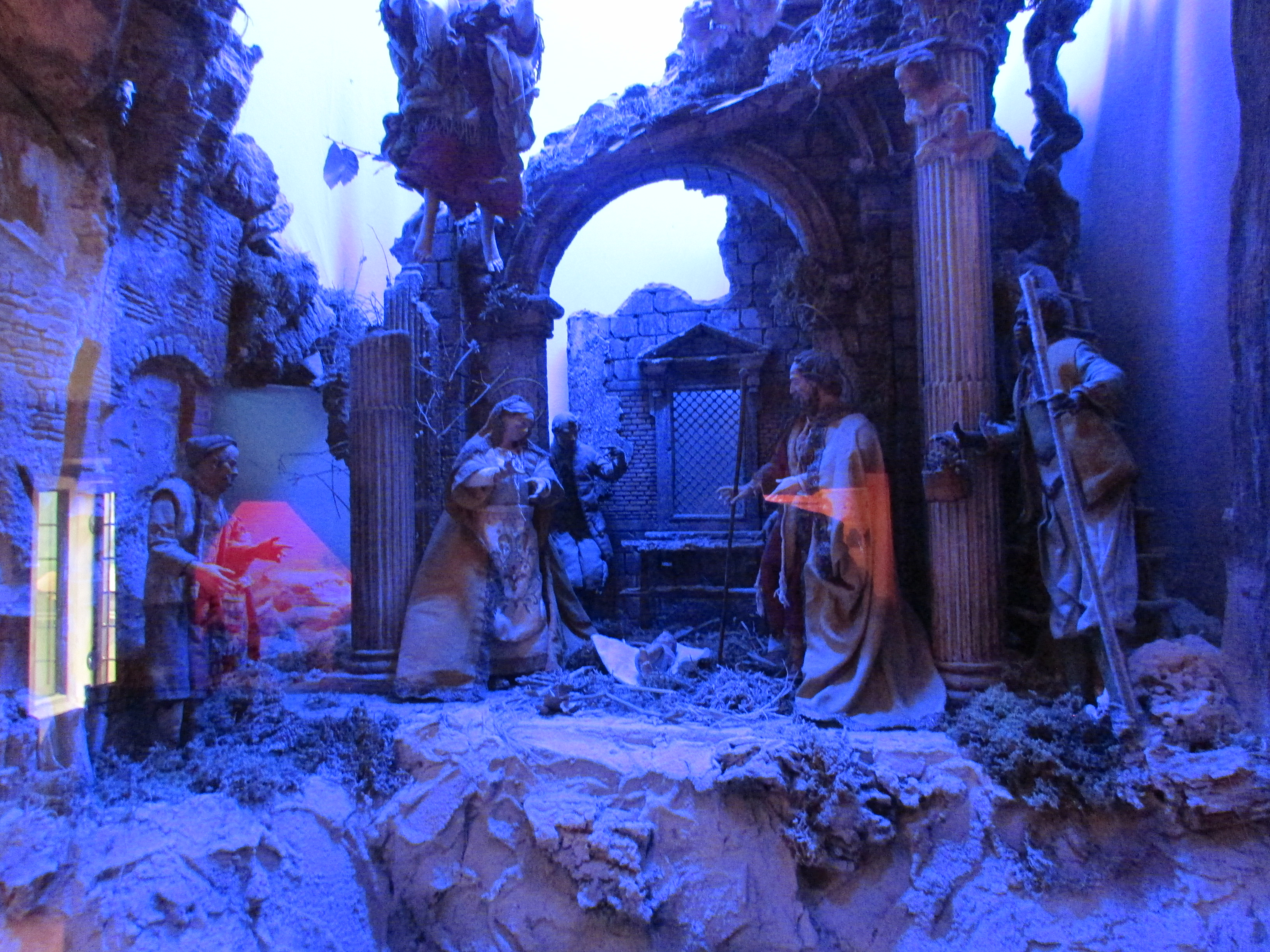
Some of the nativity scenes exhibited at the International Museum of the Crib of Greccio

The town contains the ruined church of Santa Maria, now restored as the International Museum of the Crib, the remains of the ancient towers, one of the entrance doors, the chapel dedicated to St. Francis, with the stone on which he used to preach, and the place where, according to tradition, was launched the firebrand who made public the place designated for the construction of the Sanctuary. Inside the International Museum of the Crib there are nativity scenes from all the cultures of the world on display; outside it there is a statue of Saint Francis 5 metres (16 ft) high.

=== Natural areas ===
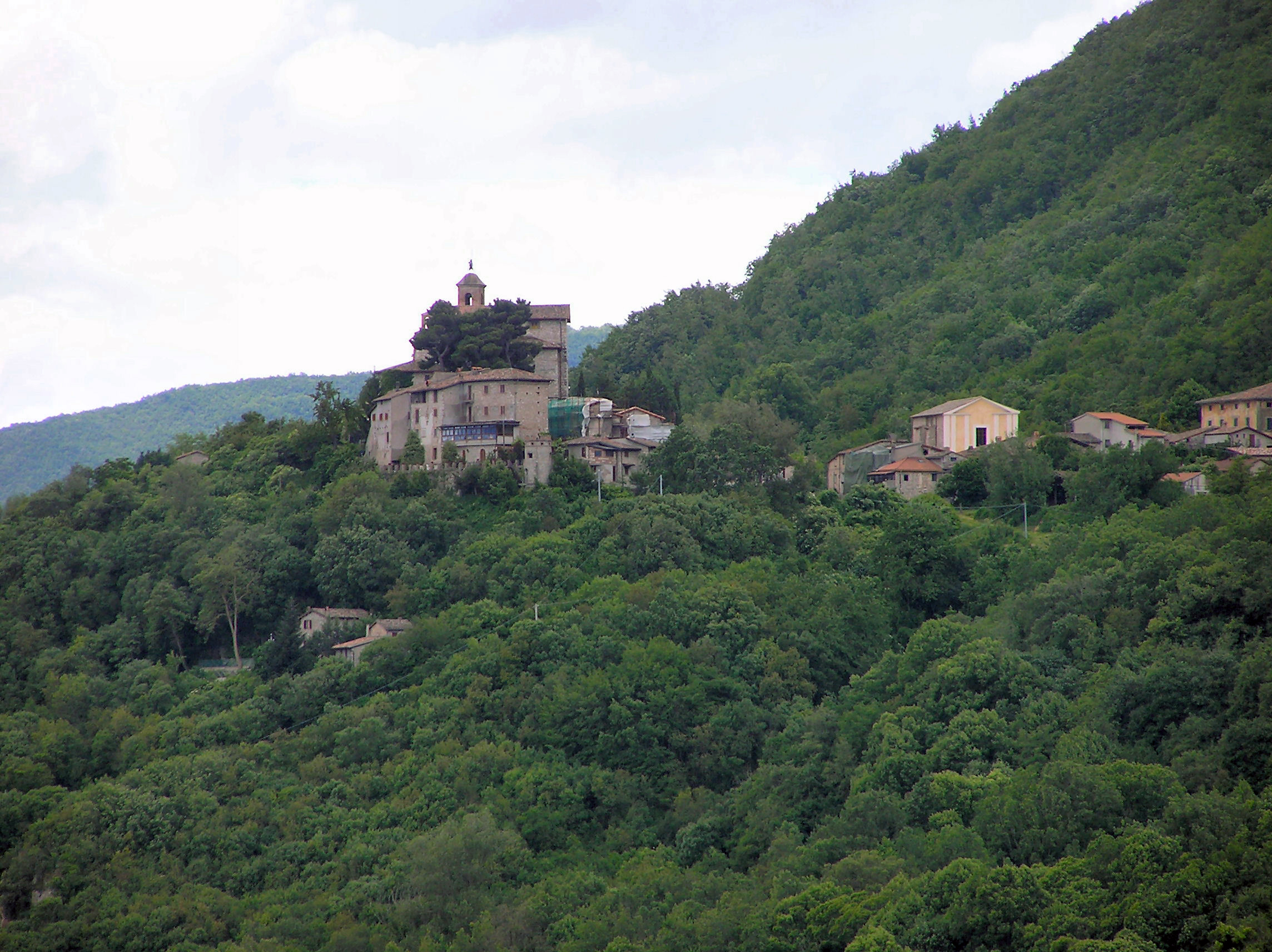
The town seen from the Sanctuary of Greccio

Greccio is surrounded by oak and elm forests, on which Mount Lacerone (1,204 metres or 3,950 feet) stands out and gives a view of the entire Rieti Valley. Here, St. Francis of Assisi, would retire in prayer and meditation in a hut protected by two hornbeam plants. In this same place, in 1712, by popular demand, was built a memorial chapel dedicated to him. Here Saint Francis of Assisi used to retreat in prayer and meditation, in a hut protected by two hornbeam trees. On the top stands "La Cappelletta", a small chapel built in 1792 in his memory.

== Geography ==
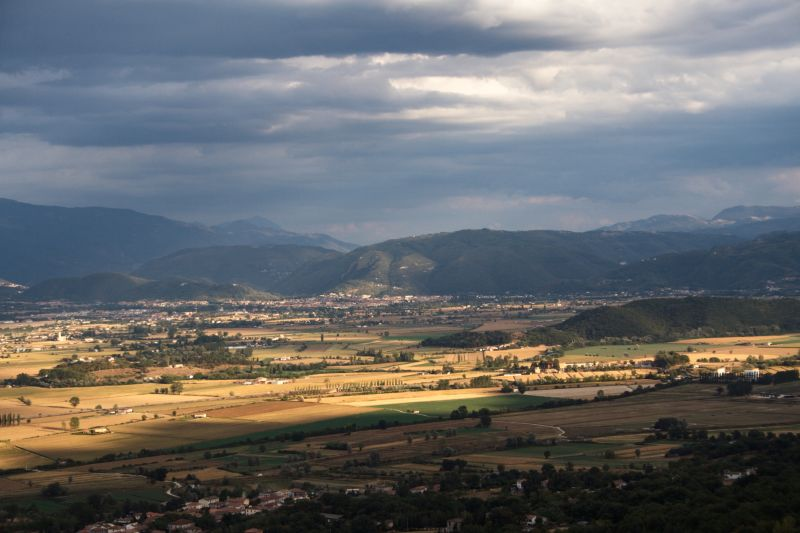
The Rieti Valley seen from Greccio, with Rieti in the background

The town of Greccio is located in Sabina, in Upper Lazio, on the border with Umbria. The medieval town of Greccio stands on a ridge of the Monti Sabini, on the western edge of the Rieti Valley, at 705 metres (2,313 ft) above sea level (about 300 metres (980 ft) higher than the valley floor).

The flat part of the town territory extends into the underlying Rieti Valley and includes the frazioni of Spinacceto, Limiti di Greccio (where the town hall is located) and Sellecchia.

Distances from the most important population centers:

- From Contigliano: 8 kilometres (5 miles);
- Rieti: 16 kilometres (10 miles);
- Terni: 27 kilometres (17 miles);
- L'Aquila: 77 kilometres (48 miles);
- Rome: 96 kilometres (60 miles).

== Demographics ==
Historical population

Year	Pop.	±%
1861	1,545	—
1871	1,729	+11.9%
1881	1,813	+4.9%
1901	1,892	+4.4%
1911	1,996	+5.5%
1921	1,951	−2.3%
1931	2,036	+4.4%
1936	1,940	−4.7%

Year	Pop.	±%
1951	2,018	+4.0%
1961	1,591	−21.2%
1971	1,361	−14.5%
1981	1,518	+11.5%
1991	1,504	−0.9%
2001	1,464	−2.7%
2011	1,520	+3.8%
2021	1,514	−0.4%

Istat historical data 1861–2021

== Economy ==
Among the most traditional, widespread and renowned economic activities are artisanal ones, such as the processing and art of iron and copper. Another important economic activity in Greccio is tourism.

== Culture ==
=== Tradition and folklore ===
The town is famous for the re-enactment of the first living nativity scene made by Francis of Assisi in 1223. On this occasion, nativity scenes are present throughout the town, and the main piazza of Greccio hosts a nativity scene art market. The living nativity scene recited by the local population, dressed in period clothing, is staged in front of the Sanctuary of Greccio, in memory of the historic event of 1223.

=== Cinema ===
Some scenes of the film Il vegetale (2018), directed by Gennaro Nunziante and starring Fabio Rovazzi, were filmed in Greccio.

== Transport ==
=== Roads ===
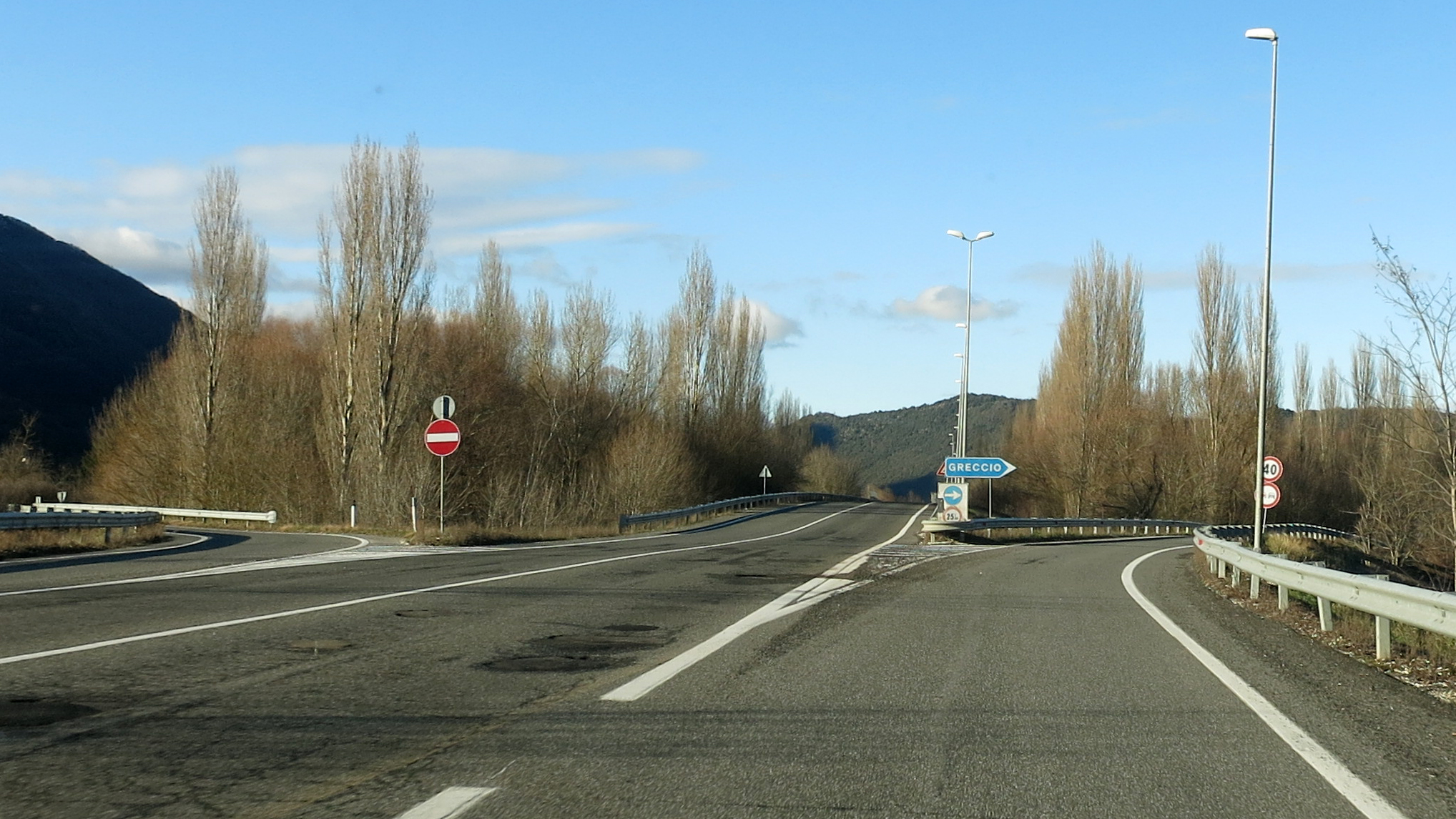
The Greccio junction on the Rieti-Terni dual carriageway (SS 79)

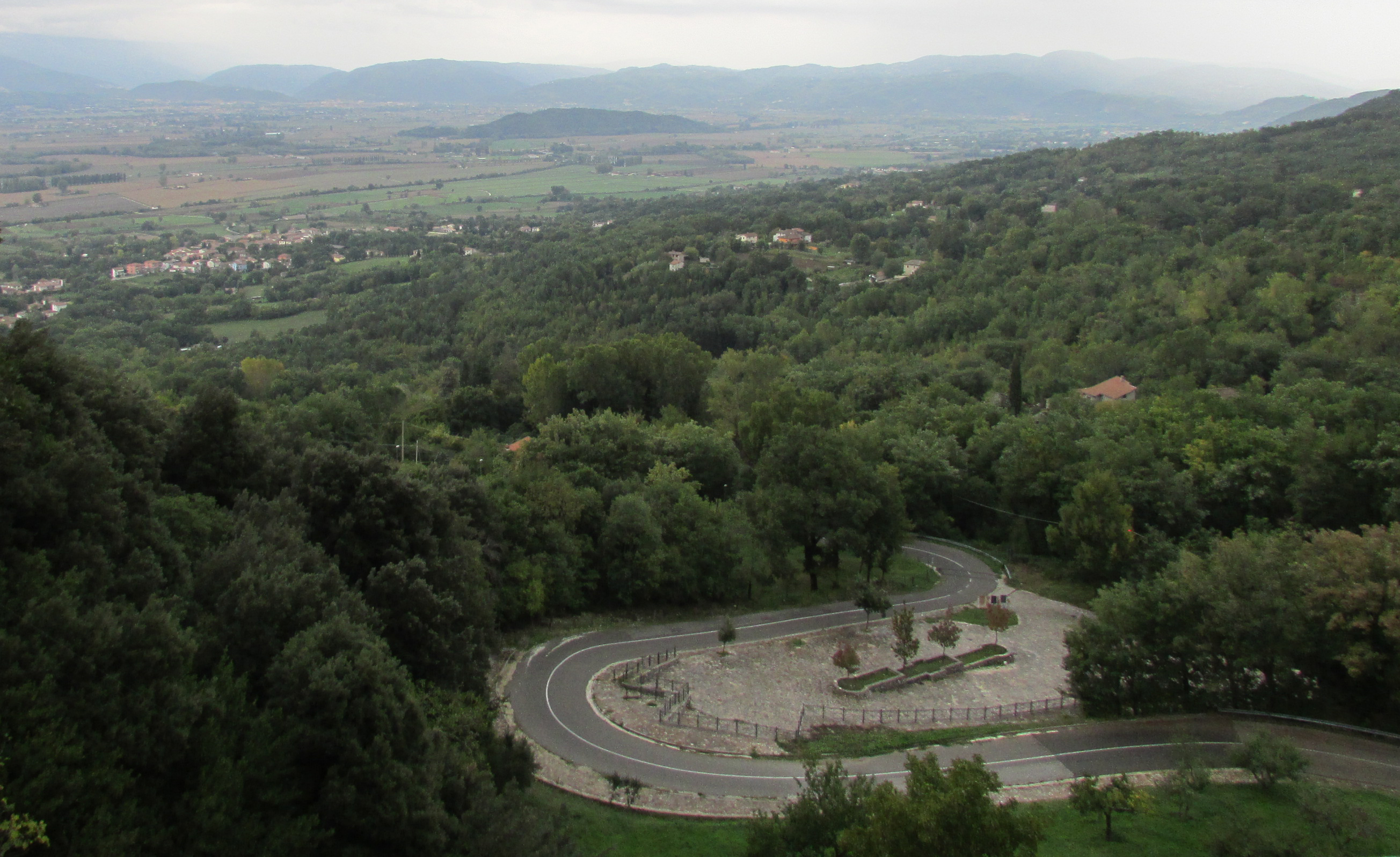
The Reopasto provincial road (SP1), which connects Greccio to the valley floor

Greccio has a junction on the Rieti-Terni dual carriageway (SS 79), which runs at the foot of the mountains where the town stands.

The Reopasto provincial road (SP1) also runs through the valley floor, the main road connecting with Rieti and Terni before the construction of the dual carriageway. Along the SP1 there are its frazioni of Spinacceto, Limiti di Greccio (where the town hall are located) and Sellecchia.

The comune of Greccio and the Franciscan sanctuary are located along the provincial road SP1, a branch of the SP1 which originates in Sellecchia and reconnects to the SP1 near Spinacceto.

=== Railways ===
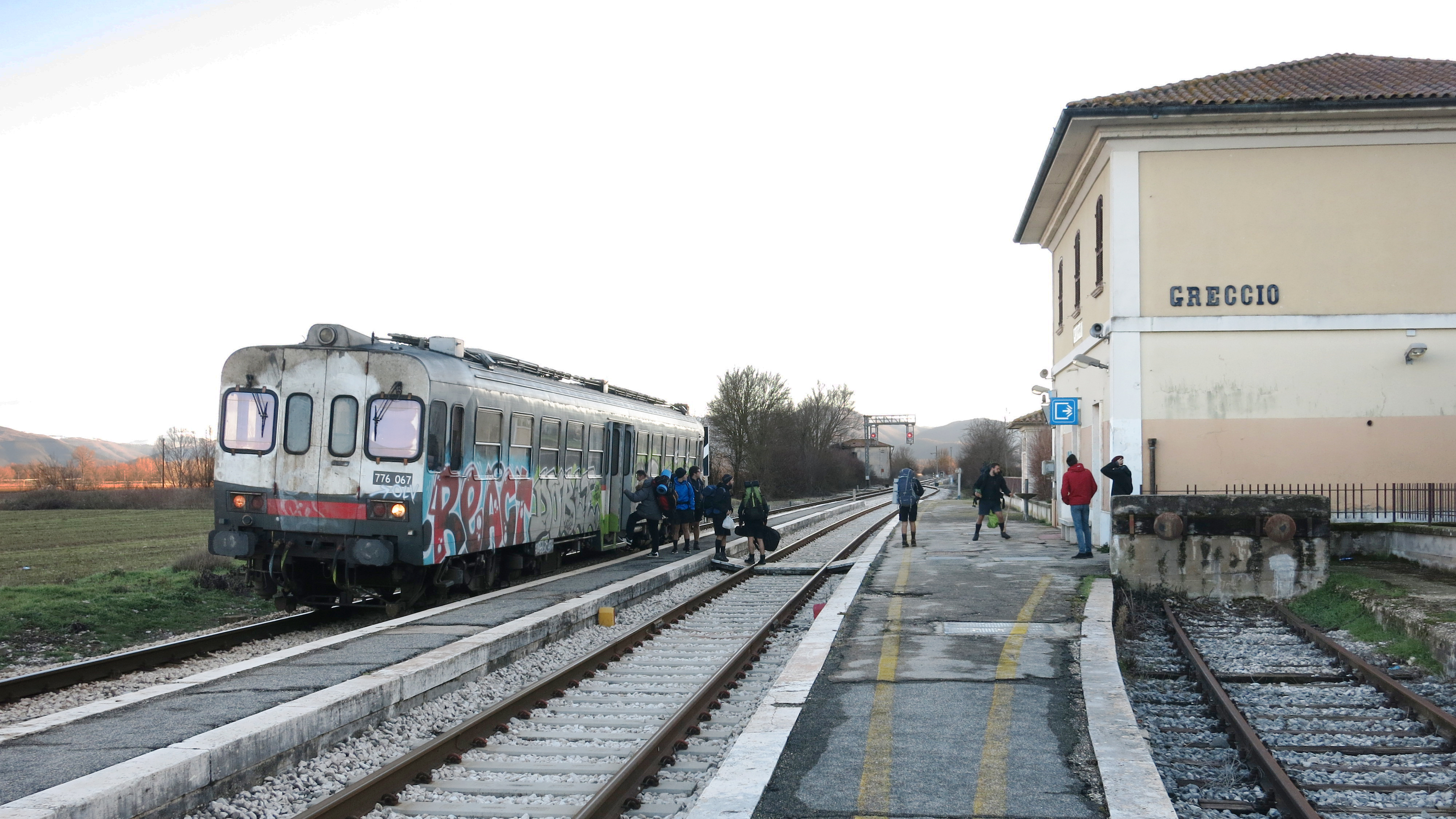
Greccio rail station

Greccio is crossed by the Terni–Sulmona railway, with trains to Terni, Rieti and L'Aquila, and is served by the Greccio rail station, located at the foot of the town in Sellecchia, 6 km (4 mi) from Greccio and 4 km (2 mi) from the sanctuary. Until 2014, the Terria rail station also served the town, located near the hamlet of Spinacceto, now abolished.

== Twin towns and sister cities ==
Greccio is twinned with:

- Bethlehem, Palestine

== Bibliography ==
- Prof. Francesco Benedetti; Greccio - From the castrum to the present day: a thousand-year journey in the sign of the presence of Francis of Assisi - 2007
- Arch. Marcello Mari; In the spirit of St. Francis - 2006
