= Andria =

Andria Iàndrie (Barese)
- Comune
- Città di Andria
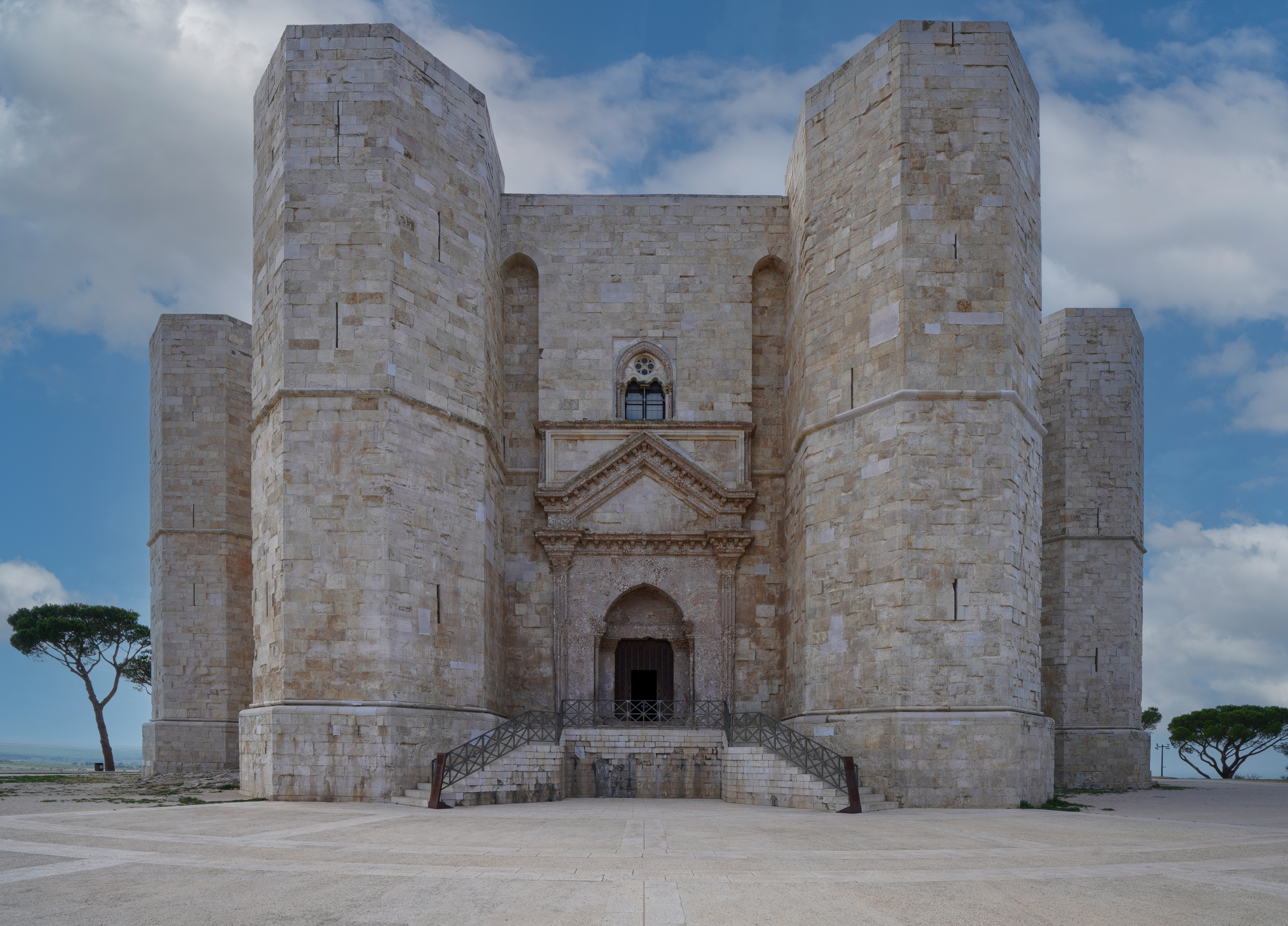
- Castel del Monte

- Flag Coat of arms

- Location within Italy Location within Apulia
- Coordinates: 41°13′N 16°18′E
- Country: Italy
- Region: Apulia
- Province: Barletta-Andria-Trani (BT)
- Frazioni: Castel del Monte, Montegrosso, Troianelli

Government
  - Mayor: Giovanna Bruno (PD)

Area
  - Total: 402.89 km^{2} (155.56 sq mi)
- Elevation: 151 m (495 ft)

Population (2026)
  - Total: 96,520
  - Density: 239.6/km^{2} (620.5/sq mi)
- Demonym: Andriesi
- Time zone: UTC+1 (CET)
  - Summer (DST): UTC+2 (CEST)
- Postal code: 76123
- Dialing code: 0883
- Patron saint: Richard of Andria
- Saint day: April 4
- Website: Official website

Andria (Italian: [ˈandrja]; Barese: Iàndrie) is a city and comune (municipality) in the region of Apulia in southern Italy, one of the 3 joint capitals of the Province of Barletta-Andria-Trani. It is an agricultural and service center, producing wine, olives and almonds. With a population of 96,520 as of 2026, it is the 4th-largest city in the region, behind Bari, Taranto, and Foggia, the largest in the province of Barletta-Andria-Trani, and the 47th-largest in Italy. It is known for the 13th-century Castel del Monte.

== History ==
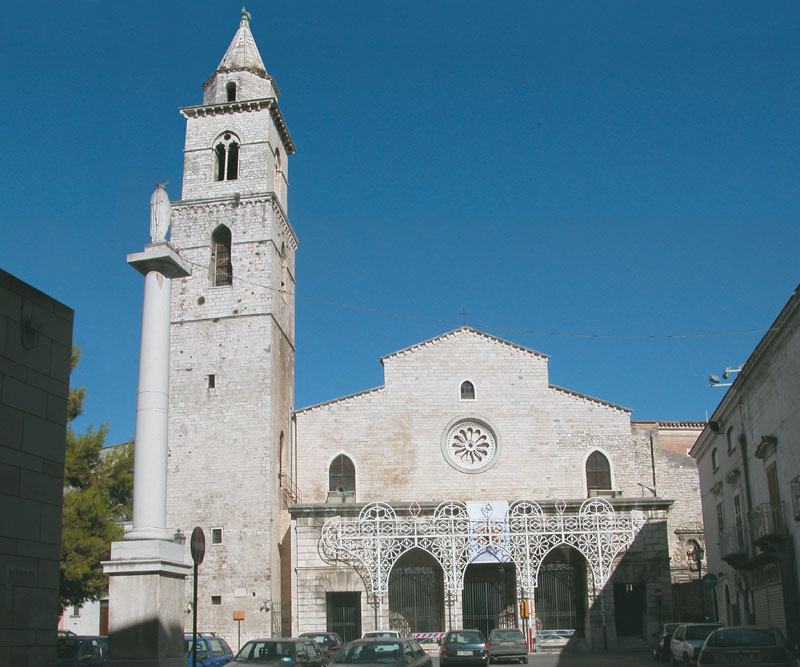
Andria Cathedral.

"...olive trees, and vineyards, unfold, and seem to flee as you pass by; then the sound of a bell strikes your ear - here I am in Andria - here is Andria the wealthy, Andria the most ancient [...] Andria the delightful, with beautiful almonds, with beautiful olives"

(Cesare Malpica, The Garden of Italy)

Ancient Age

The earliest traces of settlements in the territory of Andria date back to the Neolithic period, as some objects have been found, including obsidian knives and lithic weapons.

In the following age, during the Eneolithic period, people inhabited some caves carved into the tuff.

During the Bronze Age, people began to inhabit some cylindrical buildings with cone-shaped roofs similar to trulli. Numerous tumuli, burial sites built with rough stones, have been found in the districts of S. Barbara, S. Lucia, and Castel del Monte.

In 1000 B.C., the Iapygians inhabited Apulia, and later, in the 8th century B.C., the Peucetians settled there. The birth of the first urban settlement is attributed to the subsequent colonization by the Greeks. Near present-day Andria, Netium arose, a Greek city by language and civilization, mentioned by Strabo in Universal Geography. Some refugees who survived the destruction of Canne in 216 B.C. during the Second Punic War took refuge in Netium. Decades later, Netium declined, leaving few ruins after the social struggles between Marius and Sulla in 88 B.C. Some inhabitants of the city likely moved further south, to the coast, where they founded Juve-Netium or Neo-Netium, present-day Giovinazzo.

The Peutinger Table indicates a city named Rudas, probably the old Greek Netium, certainly a station on the Trajan's Road. The subsequent early medieval settlements of the Lombards and Byzantines arose near the ruins of old Netium. There is information about 12 hamlets, perhaps originally rustic villas, which largely bore the names of saints (Sant'Andrea, San Martino, Santa Caterina, Casalino, and San Ciriaco, located within the successive city walls, and San Candido, San Vittore, San Pietro, San Valentino, San Lizio, San Lorenzo, Borghello, Trimoggia, and Cicaglia, which remained outside them).

In 44 A.D., the apostle Peter evangelized Andria on his journey to Rome, which around 492 A.D. became a bishopric under Pope Gelasius I. In a document from 915, Andria is mentioned as a village (locus) dependent on Trani.

In 1046, it was taken from Byzantine rule by Peter the Norman, along with Trani and the rest of its territory, and like other centers (Barletta, Bisceglie, and Corato), it became a fortified city, elevated to the rank of civitas, with twelve towers, three gates, and a fortress at the highest point.

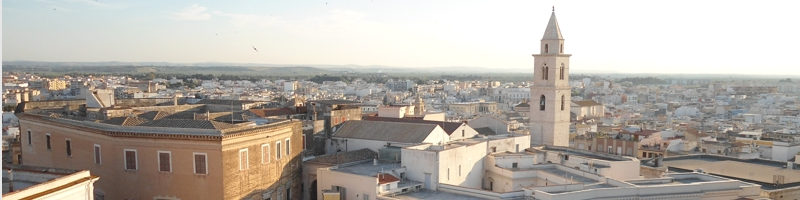
View of Andria

His son Peter II was recognized as Count in 1073. Still in the 11th century, the Benedictine abbey of Santa Maria del Monte was founded on the nearby heights of the Murge.

In 1155, the Sicilian army of William I of Sicily was decimated near Andria by the Byzantine army of Manuel I Comnenus. In that battle, Count of Andria Richard de Lingèvres lost his life, killed under the walls of the city. The last of the Norman counts descended from Peter was Count Ruggero, who fought in 1176 at Legnano with Frederick Barbarossa.

In the 13th century, it was loyal to the Swabian rule and was the residence of King Frederick II, who had the famous Castel del Monte built nearby, elected a UNESCO World Heritage Site, on the site of the previous Norman Benedictine abbey.

Returning from the Sixth Crusade, Frederick II had the famous phrase carved on the Norman Porta Sant'Andrea: "Andria fidelis, nostri affixa medullis; absit, quod Federicus sit tui muneris iners, Andria, vale, felix omnisque gravaminos expers.".

His son Conrad IV was born in Andria in 1228, to his wife Yolanda of Brienne, Queen of Jerusalem, buried in the crypt of the cathedral of Andria, who died at the age of sixteen after childbirth.

Under Angevin rule, Andria was given in dowry to Beatrice, daughter of Charles II of Naples and wife of Bertrand del Balzo, Count of Montescaglioso, who resided in the city from 1308 until his death in 1330. The city then passed to their daughter Maria.

Meanwhile, Maria del Balzo sold the city to her father Bertando. Pope Clement VI entrusted Bertrand, who was also the grand justiciar of the kingdom, to investigate the death of Andrew of Hungary. After setting up the trial, Bertrand blamed some royal attendants, excluding Queen Joanna I from any responsibility. In 1350, the city was besieged and plundered by the forces of Louis I of Hungary, convinced of Queen Joanna I's guilt.

During those days, a priest, Oliviero Matusi, secretly hid the body of Saint Richard in a safe place inside the Cathedral to prevent the Hungarians from stealing it. The secret was passed down for years only from father to son by relatives of the priest.

Bertando del Balzo, who took refuge in Avignon near Pope Clement VI during the siege, died suddenly in 1357 in Naples, where he had gone on state affairs. His body was buried in the church of San Domenico Maggiore in Naples.

In that year, he was succeeded by his son Francesco I del Balzo, who obtained the title of duke and the city (1351). Francesco I's wife, Sveva Orsini, founded the convent of San Domenico in those years.

From 11 November 1420 the feud was held by Jacopo Caldora, who owned it for several years. In 1431, the duchy passed to Francesco II del Balzo, Francesco I's nephew. From 1434 to 1436, the feud was held by Berlingiero Caldora. In 1438, the body of the city's patron saint, Saint Richard of England, who had gone missing during the previous siege, was found: in memory of the event, a festival ("Fiera d'Aprile") was established, which still takes place after almost 600 years, from April 23 to 30.

In 1462, the Prince of Taranto, Giannantonio Orsini, besieged Andria after failing to find allies in the fight against Ferrante of Aragon. Unable to penetrate it, Orsini ordered a tunnel to be dug under the city walls, but Duke Francesco II, upon discovering the news, also ordered a tunnel to be dug in the opposite direction. All enemies were captured and released. After 49 days of siege, the Duke of Andria, seeing the dire conditions of his people, surrendered, and peace was restored between the del Balzo and Orsini families.

Francesco II, brother-in-law of King Ferrante of Naples, was granted the title of Grand Constable of the Kingdom of Naples.

The Duke, appointed ambassador of the King to the papal court, was present during the installation of Pius II to the papal throne. He was also present along with Giacomo della Ratta at the Diet of Mantua in 1459 and probably established a series of relationships with princes and intellectuals of the period, including Leon Battista Alberti. Upon Francesco II's death in 1482, his son Pirro del Balzo became duke, who participated in the 1485 conspiracy of the barons and was put to death.

When Isabella del Balzo married Federico d'Aragona in Andria, the duchy passed to the royal house, and her husband ruled it until 1496 when he became king of Naples.

Modern Age

In 1503, in the plain between Andria and Corato, precisely in "Terra Quadrati," the famous Disfida di Barletta took place, which pitted the Italians led by Ettore Fieramosca against the French. In the morning, the 13 Italian knights prayed in the chapel of the cathedral of Andria. After the conquest of the Kingdom of Naples by Ferdinand the Catholic in 1504, Andria was assigned to the "Gran Capitano" Gonzalo Fernández de Córdoba, and then to his nephew, Fernando Consalvo II. He sold the city in 1552 to Fabrizio Carafa, 1st Duke of Andria and Count of Ruvo and a relative of Pope Paul IV Carafa, who splendidly restored the Ducal Palace. He was succeeded in 1554 by his son Antonio Carafa; the mother and brother, Vincenzo Carafa (who participated in the Battle of Lepanto in 1571), built the Capuchin monastery in 1577. The successor, Fabrizio Carafa, was responsible for the construction of the Benedictine monastery and the basilica of Santa Maria dei Miracoli, following the discovery in 1576 of a miraculous icon.

Subsequently, in the 17th and 18th centuries, the city remained under the rule of the Carafa dukes, in constant conflict with the bishop and the cathedral chapter, with whom the family shared possession of most of the land. The plague epidemic of 1656 decimated the population, while in 1741 the city suffered an invasion of locusts.

In 1797, the city obtained the right to elect its own mayor, and in 1799, during the Neapolitan Republic, it was besieged by the French army led by General Jean-Baptiste Broussier and supported by Count Ettore Carafa himself. The goal was to annex Andria to the Neapolitan Republic, freeing it from Bourbon rule, but the city remained faithful to the Bourbons. In the battle, about 2000 people from both sides perished. Subsequently, after the failure of the Republic, and the lack of revolution, the Bourbons had the leading Neapolitan republicans executed, including Count Ettore Carafa, guillotined in Naples on 4 September 1799. In 1806, the heirs of the Carafas sold the Ducal Palace to the Spagnoletti Zeuli family.

For its loyalty to Ferdinand IV, it obtained the title of Royal City. Under Napoleonic rule and the reigns of Joseph Bonaparte and Joachim Murat, the feudal system was abolished, and many convents were suppressed, while electoral rights were increased.

In 1818, the diocese was extended to the cities of Canosa, Minervino Murge, and Montemilone, while the city experienced a period of demographic growth and expanded beyond the city walls.

During the Risorgimento, the carbonara "Society of the Specters" or "Central Tomb" and a section of the Young Italy had headquarters in Andria. About 100 men from Andria, led by Federico Priorelli and Niccolò Montenegro, participated in Giuseppe Garibaldi's Expedition of the Thousand and were subsequently elected Deputy of the Kingdom for the Andria electoral district. After annexation to the Kingdom of Italy, the territory was the scene of brigandage actions: in 1865, the brigand leader Riccardo Colasuonno ("il Ciucciariello") was executed there.

The abolition of the latifundium and the confiscation of ecclesiastical property led to the formation of a land-owning bourgeoisie, promoting specialized agricultural productions and a thriving craft industry. The city also grew, with aristocratic residences built for the emerging classes and the establishment of two small local banks and the headquarters of several political parties. Thanks to economic development, Andria was not particularly affected by the phenomenon of emigration.

In 1851, the artist Achille Vianelli created a painting dedicated to Piazza Vaglio in Andria. The work was soon forgotten by local public opinion and kept at the Metropolitan Museum of Art in New York. On 6 October 2015, reporter and documentarian Nicola Ferrara found the painting in the list of works exhibited in the museum and made the image public through a documentary dedicated to it.

20th Century

On 1 May 1913 the working classes of Andria declared Labor Day. It is noteworthy that the film producer Cataldo Balducci presented the documentary "Grandiosa manifestazione per il primo maggio 1913 ad Andria (indetta dalle classi operaie)" which depicts the festival in 7 scenes, showing the procession along Via Cavour, Via Ettore Fieramosca, Piazza Vittorio Emanuele II, reaching Via Garibaldi, the square, and the Municipal Palace, Porta Sant'Andrea. The film shows the monument to Frederick II and the cityscape seen from the bell tower of Via Carmine.

About 800 people from Andria perished during the First World War, and they were commemorated in the Monument to the Fallen in the Remembrance Park inaugurated in 1930.

Four podestà governed Andria during Fascism: Pasquale Cafaro, Ernesto Fuzio, Hon. Consalvo Ceci, and Marco Jeva. During the fascist regime, some lands (Montegrosso, Trojanelli) were divided among the veterans of the First World War. After the armistice of 1943, the city suffered devastation by the Germans until the arrival of the Allied troops.

After the Second World War, in March 1946, due to the refusal of a local company to hire four veterans, a peasant revolt broke out, involving the seizure of some landowners and the erection of barricades. There were bloody clashes with the police forces, and it seemed that an agreement had been reached: but at the moment of the speech that the famous union leader Giuseppe Di Vittorio was to give, a gunshot was fired, reigniting the disorder: the Porro family palace, large landowners of the city, was stormed, and two elderly sisters (Carolina and Luisa Porro) were lynched. The army was subsequently sent in, which managed to quell the rebellion with harsh repression. A period of economic crisis ensued, forcing several inhabitants to emigrate.

From the 1950s onwards, there was a gradual economic recovery, favored by the inauguration in 1965 of the Bari-Barletta railway line, which connected Bari with the municipalities of the hinterland of the northern province. In 2004, the new province of Barletta-Andria-Trani was established (then activated in 2009); the city left the province of Bari, although the city of Bari has always been and continues to be a reference point for Andria and the other cities of northern Bari (see also the frequency of the University by many young people).

On 30 April 2011 its postal code changed from 70031 to 76123.

On 12 July 2016 Andria made national and international headlines following the Andria–Corato train collision that occurred in the countryside between Andria and Corato, resulting in 23 deaths and 57 injuries. To date, it represents the most serious accident ever to occur on the railways of Apulia and one of the most serious in the history of Italian railways.

== Geography ==
The city is located in the area of the Murgia and lies at a distance of 10 km (6.21 mi) from Barletta and the Adriatic coast. Its municipality, the 16th per area in Italy, borders with Barletta, Canosa di Puglia, Corato, Minervino Murge, Ruvo di Puglia, Spinazzola and Trani.

According to the Köppen climate classification, Andria features a hot-summer Mediterranean climate (Csa), bordering on a cool semi-arid climate (BSk) and a humid subtropical climate (Cfa).

== Demographics ==
Historical population
Year	Pop.	±%
1861	30,018	—
1871	34,063	+13.5%
1881	37,471	+10.0%
1901	49,967	+33.3%
1911	53,274	+6.6%
1921	58,819	+10.4%
1931	55,006	−6.5%
1936	56,152	+2.1%
1951	66,254	+18.0%
1961	70,831	+6.9%
1971	77,065	+8.8%
1981	84,661	+9.9%
1991	90,063	+6.4%
2001	95,653	+6.2%
2011	100,052	+4.6%
2021	97,588	−2.5%
Source: ISTAT

As of 2026, the population is 96,520, of which 49.3% are males, and 50.7% are females. Minors make up 16.2% of the population, and seniors make up 21.1%.

=== Immigration ===
As of 2025, immigrants make up 2.6% of the population. The 5 largest foreign countries of birth are Romania, Germany, France, Nigeria, and Tunisia.

== Sights ==
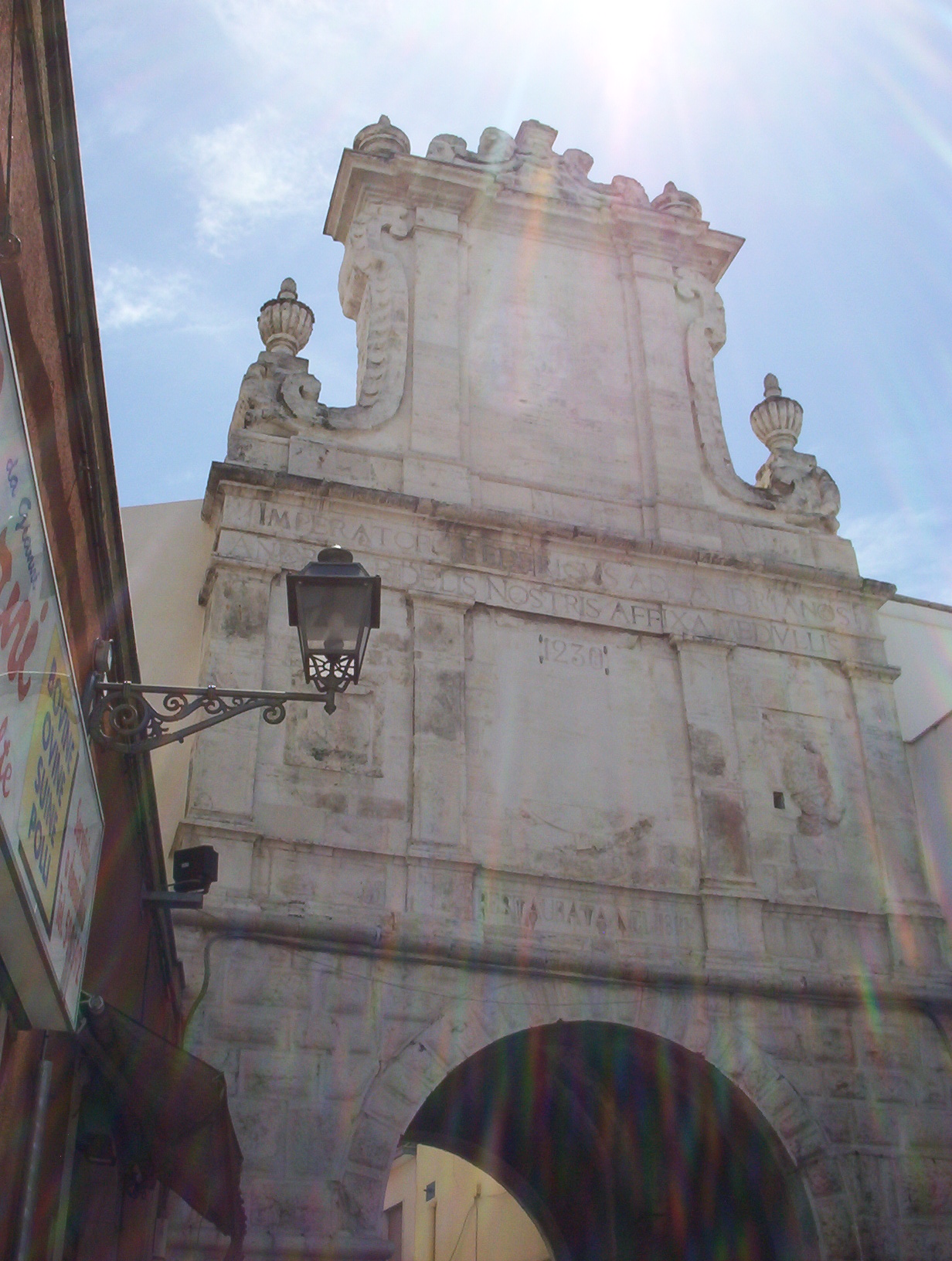
Porta Sant'Andrea.

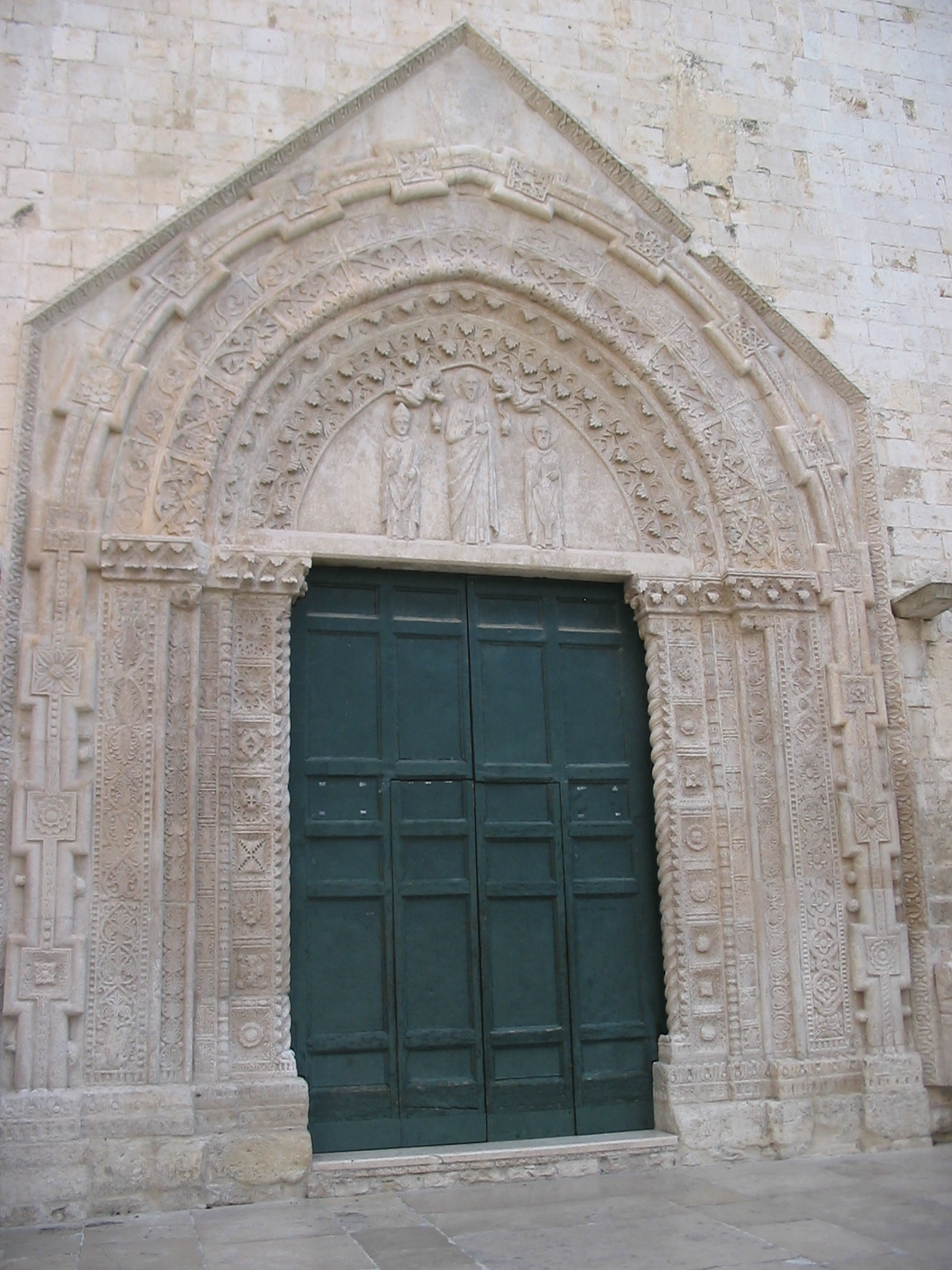
The 13th-century church of Sant'Agostino.

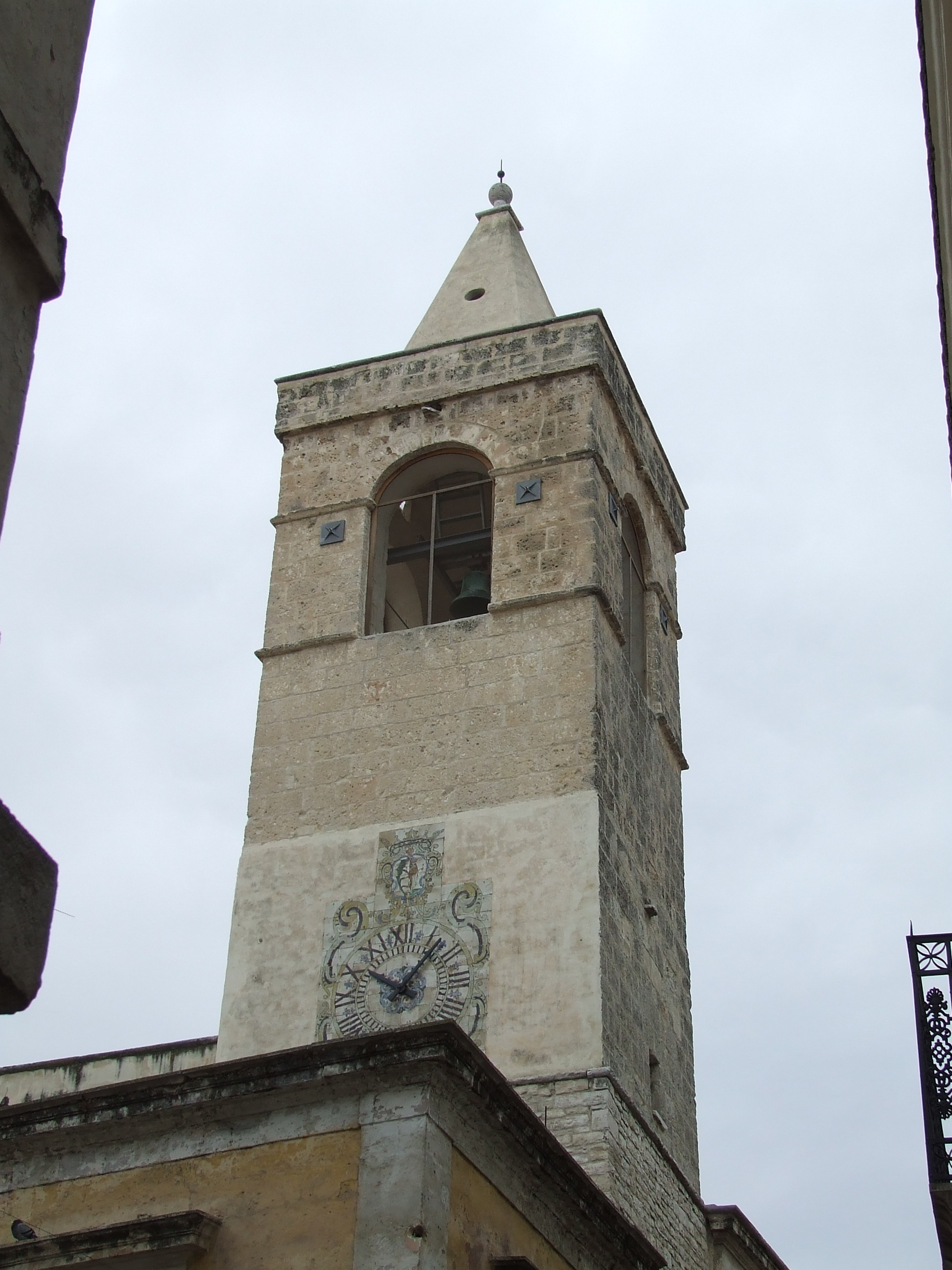
Torre dell'orologio.

Andria was a favorite residence of Emperor Frederick II, who built the imposing 13th-century Castel del Monte about 15 km south of the city center; it is one of the most famous Italian castles, and was listed as a UNESCO World Heritage Site in 1996.

Other sights include:

- The 12th-century cathedral, which has a 7th-century crypt
- The Ducal Palace, a fortified residence renovated in the 16th century
- San Domenico (14th century, largely renovated in the following centuries). Church contains a bust of Duke Francesco II Del Balzo attributed to Francesco Laurana, and a 16th-century wooden sculpture of the Madonna with Child.
- Sant'Agostino, church built in the 13th century by the Teutonic Knights, who originally dedicated it to one of their patrons, Saint Leonard. The church was later handed over to the Benedictines, and rebuilt by the Augustinians after the sieges of 1350. The main points of interests are the Gothic-style gates, with precious reliefs and crests of the Del Balzo and Anjou families, as well as the Teutonic eagles.
- San Francesco, church and monastery with its cloister (12th century)
- The Communal Palace
- Santa Maria dei Miracoli (16th century), Sanctuary basilica 2 kilometres (1 mile) from Andria, housing a venerated Byzantine icon from the 9th-10th centuries. The basilica is on three different levels. The lower, and most ancient, comprises a hall with a nave and two aisles, with decoration showing stories from Genesis. The middle level (Tempietto) has three arcades in polychrome marbles, and is home to the Byzantine icon. The upper level, the 18th century basilica designed by Cosimo Fanzago, is preceded by another church, dedicated to the Holy Crucifix and decorated with frescoes depicting the Passion of Christ.
- San Nicola di Myra, 12th century church, with subsequent refurbishments
- The church of the Holy Cross (9th century). It has a nave and two aisles, separated by four pilasters. The crypt was dug in a tuff rock and includes some natural grottoes.
- The church of Santa Maria di Porta Santa (13th century).
- Santuario Madonna dell'Altomare

== Transport ==
Andria is connected by the A14 National Motorway, and the SP 231 provincial road connecting it to Bari and Foggia.

Andria has a railway station in the Bari–Barletta railway, part of the Ferrovie del Nord Barese network managed by Ferrotramviaria. The nearest Trenitalia-FS (Italian national railroads) station is that of Barletta, 10 kilometres (6 miles) from Andria. On 12 July 2016, a head-on collision between two passenger trains occurred on the line south of Andria. At least 23 people were killed and dozens more injured.

The nearest airport is that of Bari, 45 kilometres (28 miles) away.

== Sport ==
Andria is the home of football team Fidelis Andria. The team's home stadium is Stadio Degli Ulivi.

== Notable people ==
- Peter I of Trani (born before 1020), also known as Petronius, the first Norman count of Trani
- Richard of Andria (died 1196), Bishop of Andria
- Isabella II of Jerusalem (1212–1228), wife of Frederick II, Holy Roman Emperor, buried in the Cathedral crypt
- Isabella of England (1214–1241), third wife of Frederick II, Holy Roman Emperor buried in the Cathedral crypt
- Conrad IV of Germany (1228–1254), member of the Hohenstaufen dynasty, the only son of Frederick II, Holy Roman Emperor
- Antonia of Baux (c. 1353–1375), Italian noblewoman
- Isabella del Balzo (1465–1533), Queen consort of Naples
- Tuccio d'Andria (late 15th century), Italian painter
- Vincenzo Carafa (1585–1649), Italian Jesuit priest and spiritual writer
- Farinelli (1705–1782), stage name of Carlo Maria Michelangelo Nicola Broschi, a celebrated Italian castrato singer
- Ettore Carafa (1767–1799), the Count of Ruvo, Italian soldier and republican patriot
- Corrado Ursi (1908–2003), Italian cardinal
- Lino Banfi (born 1936), Italian film actor and presenter
- Antonio Matarrese (born 1940), Italian football manager
- Riccardo Scamarcio (born 1979), Italian actor and film producer

== International relations ==
=== Twin towns – sister cities ===
Andria is twinned with:

- Alberobello, Italy
- Monte Sant'Angelo, Italy, since 2013
