= Francesco Calò =

Italian painter

Francesco Calò (born 1749) was an Italian painter of the late-Baroque period.

He was born in Molfetta. He trained in Rome. He painted sacred subjects in both oil and fresco. He also painted portraits. He painted altarpieces of San Nicola di Andria. He was likely influenced by Corrado Giaquinto and related or identical to the Molfetta fresco painter Vito Calò (Molfetta, 1744 - 1817).
