= San Francesco, Civitanova Marche =

Roman Catholic former-church, auditorium and exhibit hall in Macerata, Marche, Italy

Coordinates: 43°18′57″N 13°40′52″E

San Francesco, also formerly known as the chiesa of Santa Maria Maddalena is a Roman Catholic former-church, now auditorium and exhibit hall located on the edge of the Piazza della Libertà in the upper town of Civitanova Marche (Civitanova Alta), in the province of Macerata, Marche, central Italy.

== History ==
The church was first erected in the 13th century, and reconstructed in the present layout in the mid-18th century. The cupola has an oval shape, and the interior has a baroque richness recalling Borromini. The exterior is in unfinished brick, but the Romanesque portal is made of white stone decorated with leaf-frieze. The main arch inside dates completion to 1769. The organ is attributed to Pietro Nacchini. The stucco work was completed by Giacchino Varlè, who also worked on the nearby Sant'Agostino.

The chapels of prominent families, such as the Centofiorini, Natinguerra e Frisciotti, predated the 18th century reconstruction and were incorporated into the new structure. The exterior bell tower dates from the second half of the 15th century, and is attributed to Marino di Marco Cedrino.

After the suppression of the Franciscan order in the 19th century, the church was abandoned and the adjacent convent was used as barracks for the police, and jail.
