= San Francesco, Rieti =

Roman Catholic church in Lazio, Italy

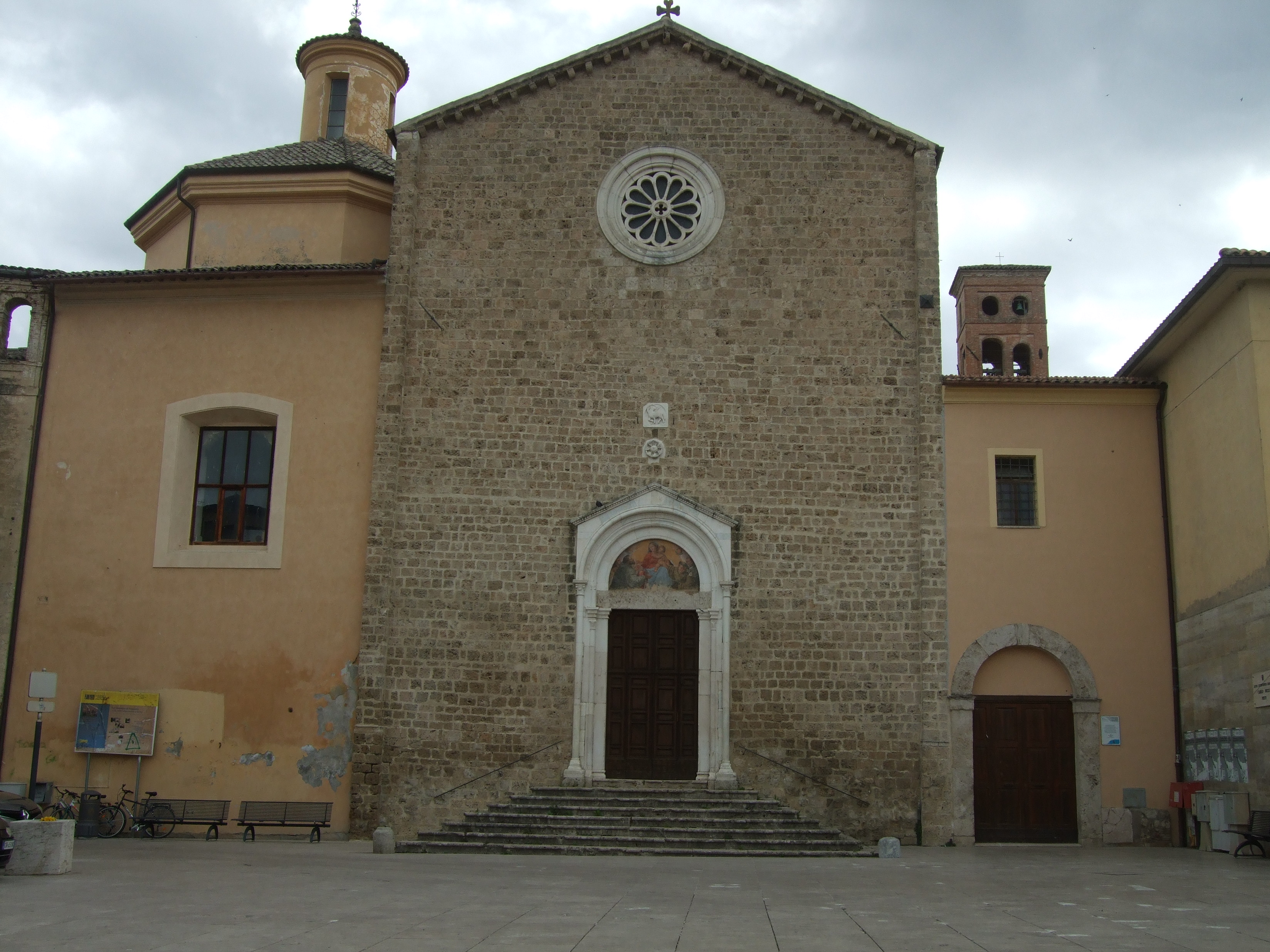
Facade of church

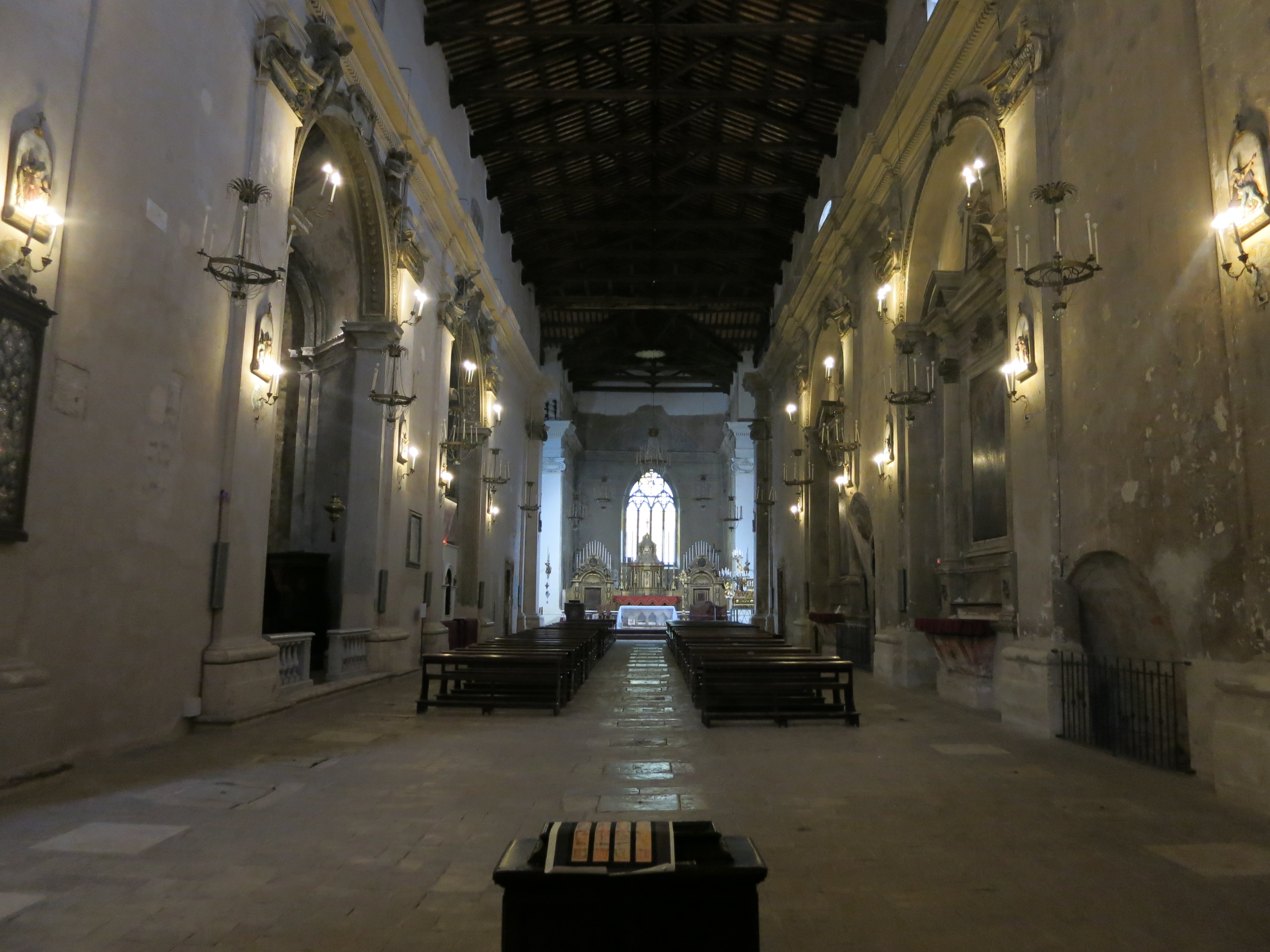
Interior of church

San Francesco is a Gothic-style, deconsecrated Roman Catholic church located on Piazza San Francesco in the medieval center of the city of Rieti, region of Lazio, Italy.

== History ==
Francis of Assisi himself in his travels through the center of Italy had spent time in this region, and by 1217 was said to have founded four oratories, which subsequently became sanctuaries respectively: Fonte Colonna, Greccio, Poggio Bustone and della Foresta. He also putatively founded the Convent at Labro.

The initial construction of this church, attached to a hospital, was noted by a bull of Pope Innocent IV in 1245. In 1463, attached the church, the chapel of the Holy Cross was rededicated as the Oratory of St Bernardino. Putatively this occurred after Bernardino of Siena in 1444 miraculously healed the daughter of a townsman Giovanni D'Antonio Petruccio.

In 1860, the church and adjacent monastery were suppressed and used as barracks. In 1898, the commune granted the church again to the Order of the Pia Unione though limited it use in church services.

Many of the interior frescoes were detached. The apse retains six scenes of a larger series: Dream of Pope Innocent III, Miracle of the Presepe of the Greccio, Vision of the Car of Fire, Vision of the Thrones, Healing of the Ill man of Lerida, and Freeing the heretic Peter from Jail. The church also has a restored canvas depicting Madonna and Child between Saints Francis and Elizabeth of Hungary by Vincenzo Manenti. The organ was restored by Francesco Tessicini in 1843.
