= Michele de Napoli =

Italian painter

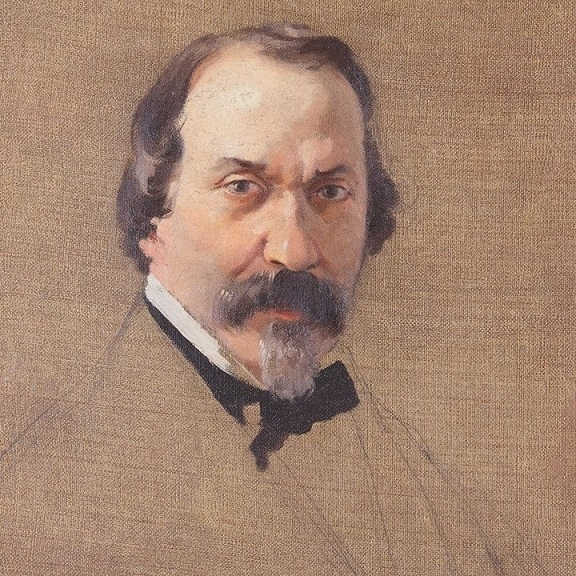
Self-portrait, oil on canvas, Michele De Napoli Art Gallery, Terlizzi

Michele de Napoli (April 28, 1808 – March 24, 1892) was an Italian painter, mainly of grand manner historic and religious paintings in a Neoclassic style in Naples, Italy.

== Biography ==
He was born in Terlizzi, in the province of Bari to Giuseppe de Napoli and Maria Michele Mastrandea. Initially intending to become a lawyer, he moved to Naples at the age of 19 to pursue studies, but became attracted to art. After graduating from law in 1833, he became a pupil of Costanzo Angelini. The painting of Alcibiades gained him a scholarship to study in Rome. He painted in frescoes for the church of Monteverginella (1843).

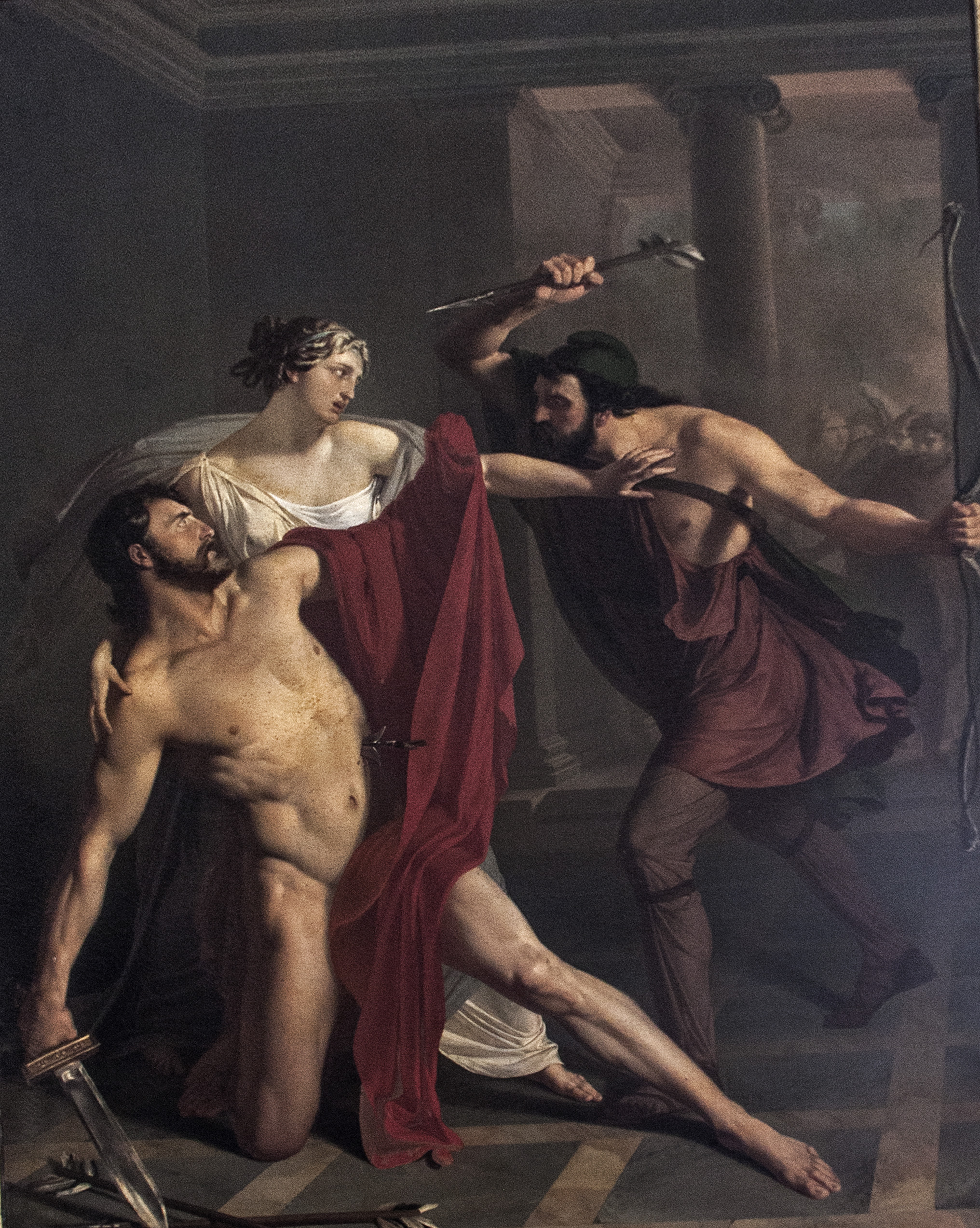
Death of Alcibiades (1839), National Archaeological Museum, Naples

He also painted frescoes on the Martyrdom of Santa Lucia (1845), for the church of Santa Lucia. He painted the sipario or theater curtain (1849) at the Teatro del Fondo in Naples. He painted a Vision of Santa Maria Maddalena (1853) for the church of Santa Maria Maddalena ai Cristallini

He painted a St Francis of Assisi with Stigmata (1853) now in Capodimonte. He painted frescoes (1853–54) for the wall of the chorus of San Domenico Maggiore. In 1854, he painted a curtain for the teatro Piccinni of Bari; then frescoes for the Andria Cathedral (1855) and the Capua Cathedral (1856). In 1859, he painted a St Benedict resurrects a peasant boy for the Benedictine church in Catania.

In 1860, he was nominated lawyer for the city, and member of the city council, and inspector of the National Museum of Naples. He was attached to the liberal party. In 1863, he married Luisa Patella, 26 years his junior; they had no children. He moved to Terlizzi for the remainder of his life. For 15 years, he was active as a politician. In 1876, he returned to paint two canvases (Baptism of St Augustine and Death of St. Jerome) for the Altamura Cathedral. Many of his later works were donated to the Cathedral of Terlizzi, where they are today. He left money for his studio to be made into a museum, but this is closed due to lack of funds.
