= Andria Cathedral =

Church building in Andria, Italy

Coordinates: 41°13′33″N 16°17′44″E

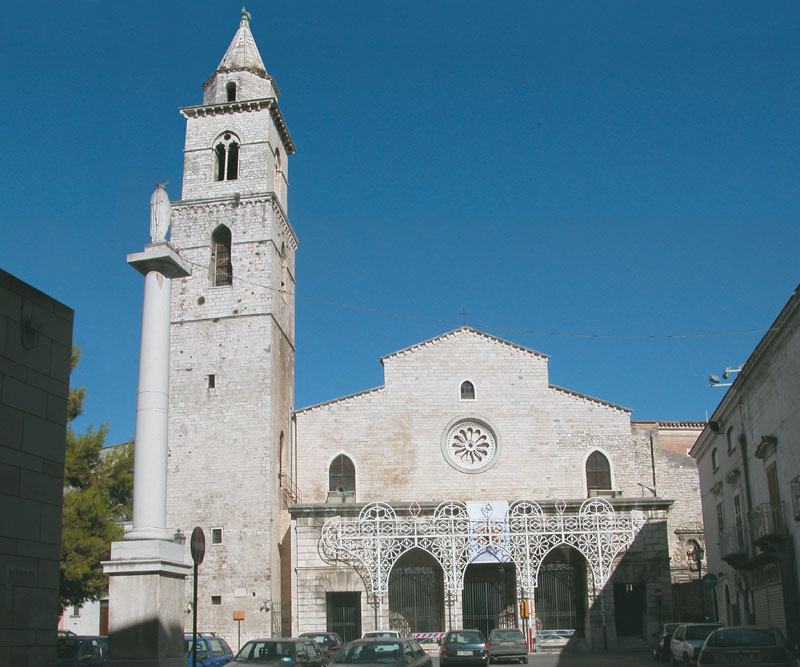
Andria Cathedral west front

Andria Cathedral (Italian: Duomo di Andria, Cattedrale di Santa Maria Assunta) is a Roman Catholic cathedral in Andria in Apulia, Italy, which up to 2009 was in the Province of Bari but from then onwards part of the newly formed Province of Barletta-Andria-Trani. It is dedicated to the Assumption of the Virgin Mary and is the seat of the bishop of Andria.

== Overview ==
The present cathedral was built by the Norman Geoffrey of Hauteville, lord of Andria, on top of an earlier small church of the 7th-8th century, which forms the present crypt. It received further extensive refurbishment and reconstruction in the mid-14th century in the Late Gothic style, and again later in the Baroque style. The cathedral was severely damaged by a fire in 1916 and was again restored in 1965. The frequent rebuildings have given what is basically a Norman church a predominantly Late Gothic appearance.

The crypt, dedicated to the Holy Saviour (San Salvatore) - unlike the main cathedral, which is dedicated to the Assumption - contains the tombs of two empresses, Isabella II of Jerusalem and Isabella of England.

The cathedral owns a gold reliquary of special importance, and two major 19th-century paintings by Michele de Napoli.

== Sources and external links ==
- Catholic Encyclopedia: Diocese of Andria
- Catholic Hierarchy: Diocese of Andria
- InItalyToday.com: brief description of cathedral and crypt
- Apulia Tourist Board official website: brief description of cathedral and crypt (in German and Italian)
