= Punta Beppe Tuccio Lighthouse =

Punta Beppe Tuccio
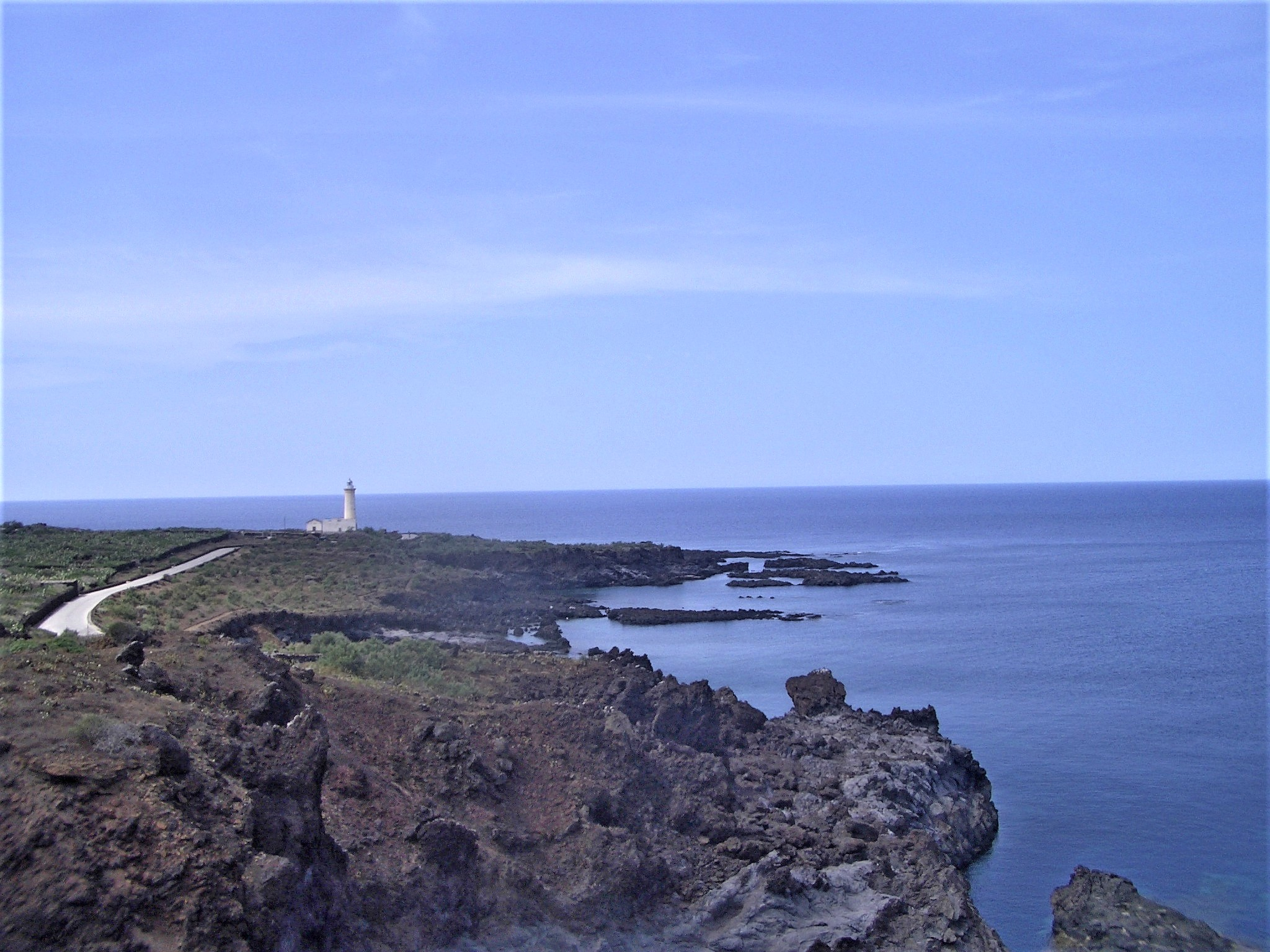
- Punta Beppe Tuccio Lighthouse
- Location: Linosa; Pelagian Islands; Sicily; Italy
- Coordinates: 35°52′20″N 12°52′43″E

Tower
- Constructed: 1891
- Foundation: concrete base
- Construction: masonry tower
- Height: 17 m (56 ft)
- Shape: cylindrical tower with balcony and lantern atop a 1-storey keeper's house
- Markings: white tower and lantern, grey metallic lantern dome
- Power source: mains electricity
- Operator: Marina Militare

Light
- Focal height: 32 m (105 ft)
- Lens: Type OF; Focal length: 250mm
- Range: main: 16 nautical miles (30 km; 18 mi) reserve: 12 nautical miles (22 km; 14 mi)
- Characteristic: Fl(4) W 20s
- Italy no.: 3054 E.F.

Punta Beppe Tuccio Lighthouse (Italian: Faro di Punta Beppe Tuccio) is an active lighthouse located on the north eastern tip of the island of Linosa which makes part of the Pelagian Islands in the Channel of Sicily.

== Description ==
The lighthouse, built in 1891, consists of a cylindrical tower, 6 metres (20 ft) high, with balcony and lantern rising from a 1-storey keeper's house composed of 11 rooms. The tower, the building and the lantern are white, the lantern dome is grey metallic. The light is positioned at 32 metres (105 ft) above sea level and emits four white flashes in a 20 seconds period visible up to a distance of 16 nautical miles (30 km; 18 mi). The lighthouse is completely automated and managed by the Marina Militare with the identification code number 3054 E.F.

== See also ==
- List of lighthouses in Italy
- Pelagian Islands
