= Sant'Agostino, Civitanova Marche =

Roman Catholic former-church, auditorium and exhibit hall in Marche, Italy

Coordinates: 43°18′59″N 13°40′47″E

Sant'Agostino is a Roman Catholic former-church, now auditorium and exhibit hall located in the upper town of Civitanova Marche (Civitanova Alta), in the province of Macerata, region of Marche, Italy.

== History ==
A church was present at the site prior to the 14th century, and was rebuilt in the 18th century. The church was dedicated to St Anthony the Abbot, later to Saint Augustine. The interiors were elegantly decorated with stucco in a late-Baroque (Rococo) style by the stucco artists Agostino Varlè. The organ was commissioned from Gaetano Antonio Callido. In the 1990s, the church was deconsecrated and became a cultural events hall. It retains sacred works of art by Pietro Tedeschi, including depictions of the Madonna della cintura (Pregnant Madonna), St Nicola of Tolentino and the Souls of Purgatory, and the Charity of St Thomas of Villanova. The church is adjacent to the Pinacoteca Comunale “Marco Moretti”, and serves as a hall for larger exhibitions. da anni è lo spazio eccellente per eventi eccellenti: mostre d’arte di risonanza nazionale.
