= San Francesco, Andria =

Former church in Apulia, Italy

San Francesco is a Gothic-style, former Roman Catholic church located in the town of Andria, province of Barletta-Andria-Trani, Apulia, Italy.

== History ==
Construction of the church began in 1230, and was not completed till 1346. The interior underwent a major baroque refurbishment in the 18th century. To the right of the presbytery is the Chapel of the Archiconfraternity of the Addolorata, patronized by Count Onofrio Spagnoletti. In contains a venerated statue of the Madonna used in Holy Week processions. Among the altarpieces are four lateral canvases attributed to Niccolò Porta. The polychrome main altar was built in the 18th century. The organ (1766) was built by Tommaso Porziotta.

The monastery was suppressed in 1812, and the convent underwent many secular uses, including as a jail and later a public school. In 2019, some of the monastery is used by municipal offices.
