= Sanctuary of Greccio =

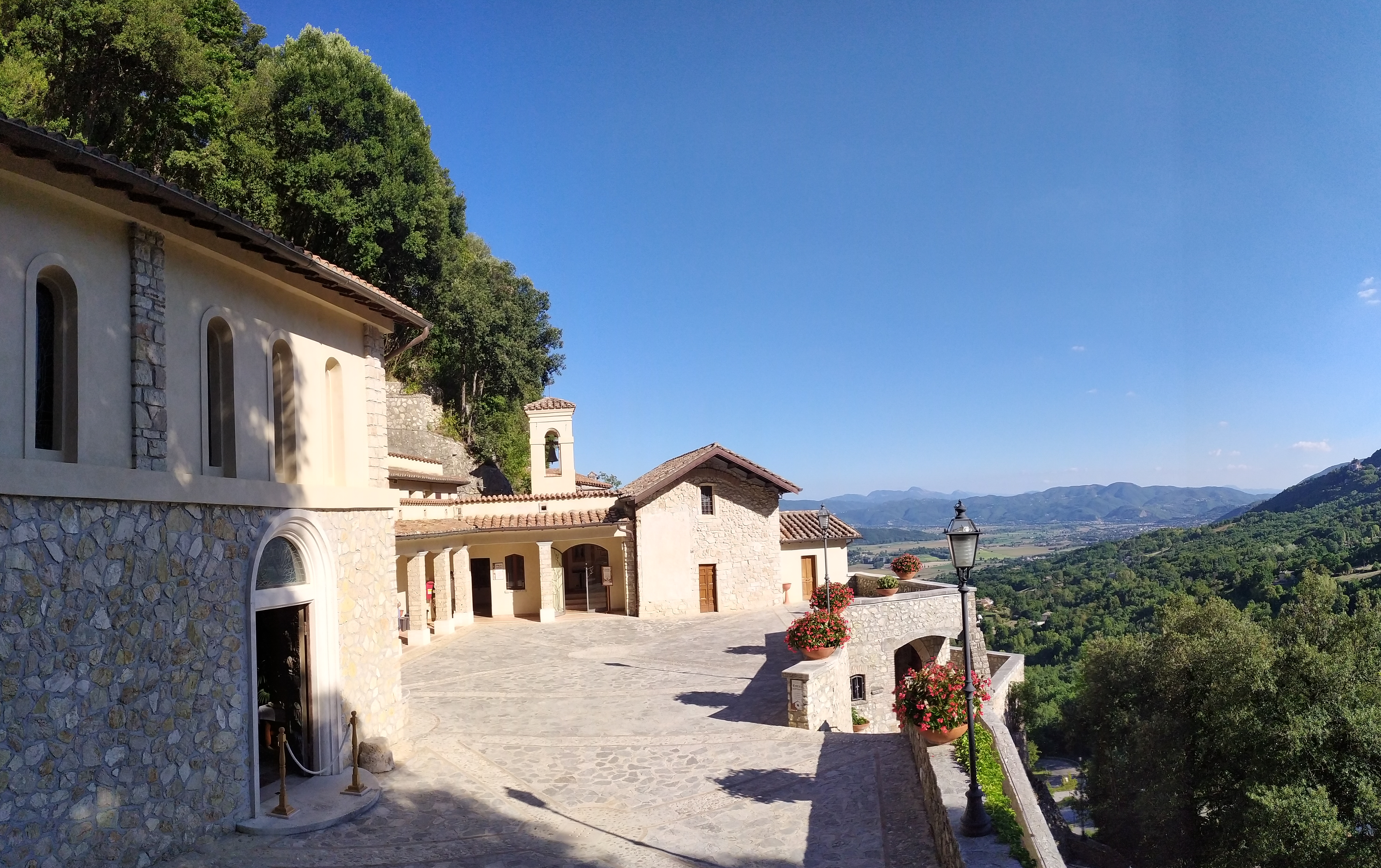
- View of the Sanctuary
- Sanctuary of Greccio
- 42°27′42.99″N 12°45′3.68″E
- Location: Greccio
- Country: Italy
- Denomination: Roman Catholic

History
- Status: Hermitage

Architecture
- Functional status: Active
- Architectural type: Church
- Completed: 1228

Administration
- Province: Rieti
- Diocese: Rieti

The Hermitage of Greccio Sanctuary (Italian: Santuario Eremo di Greccio) is one of the four shrines erected by Saint Francis of Assisi in the Sacred Valley, along with the Sanctuary of Fonte Colombo, the Sanctuary of the Forest, and the convent of Poggio Bustone. It is located in the Italian town of Greccio, about 15 kilometres (9.3 miles) from the city of Rieti, seat of the homonym province, is recessed at an altitude of 665 metres (2,182 ft) above sea level, in the rocks of the mountains in the immediate vicinity of the medieval village of Greccio with views of the wide Rieti Valley.

Francis presented the first living Nativity scene in a nearby cave in December 1223.

== Legend ==
The Saint Francis of Assisi legendarium affirms that he chose this place for devotions. A story within the legendarium tells of a child to whom Francis threw a firebrand, flying like an arrow, and it landed on the rock wall of a hill, the Velita, owned by a lord of Greccio.

== Saint Francis's creation of the Nativity scene, 1223 ==
In 1223, Francis here observed and oversaw a retelling, with live people, of the story the birth of Christ on Christmas Eve. Since then, Greccio and its sanctuary is the country of the first nativity scene in the world. Later it was twinned with Bethlehem.

== Sanctuary and chapel ==
The shrine is a Latin cross, characterized by a side wall and an apse hexagonal. The mullioned windows are Gothic style. Inside there are frescoes modern and original chapel of the saint carved in the rock. The church is located after crossing the square. It joins the refectory. The church has a Latin cross with a bell tower. Under the medieval church is the crypt of St. Francis with a lunette showing the 'Preparation of the Nativity. The painting dates from the 13th century.

== Gallery ==
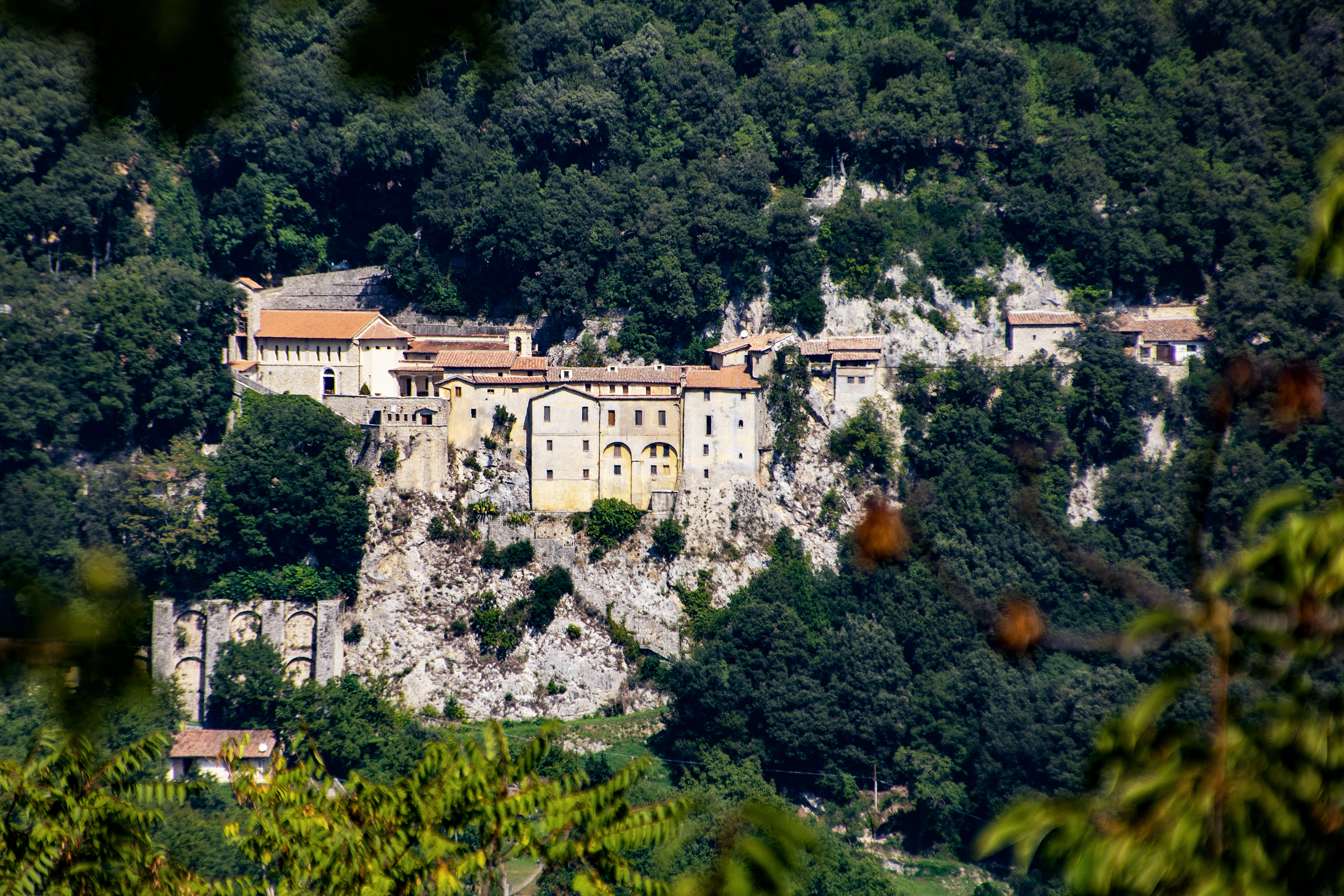
View of the convent

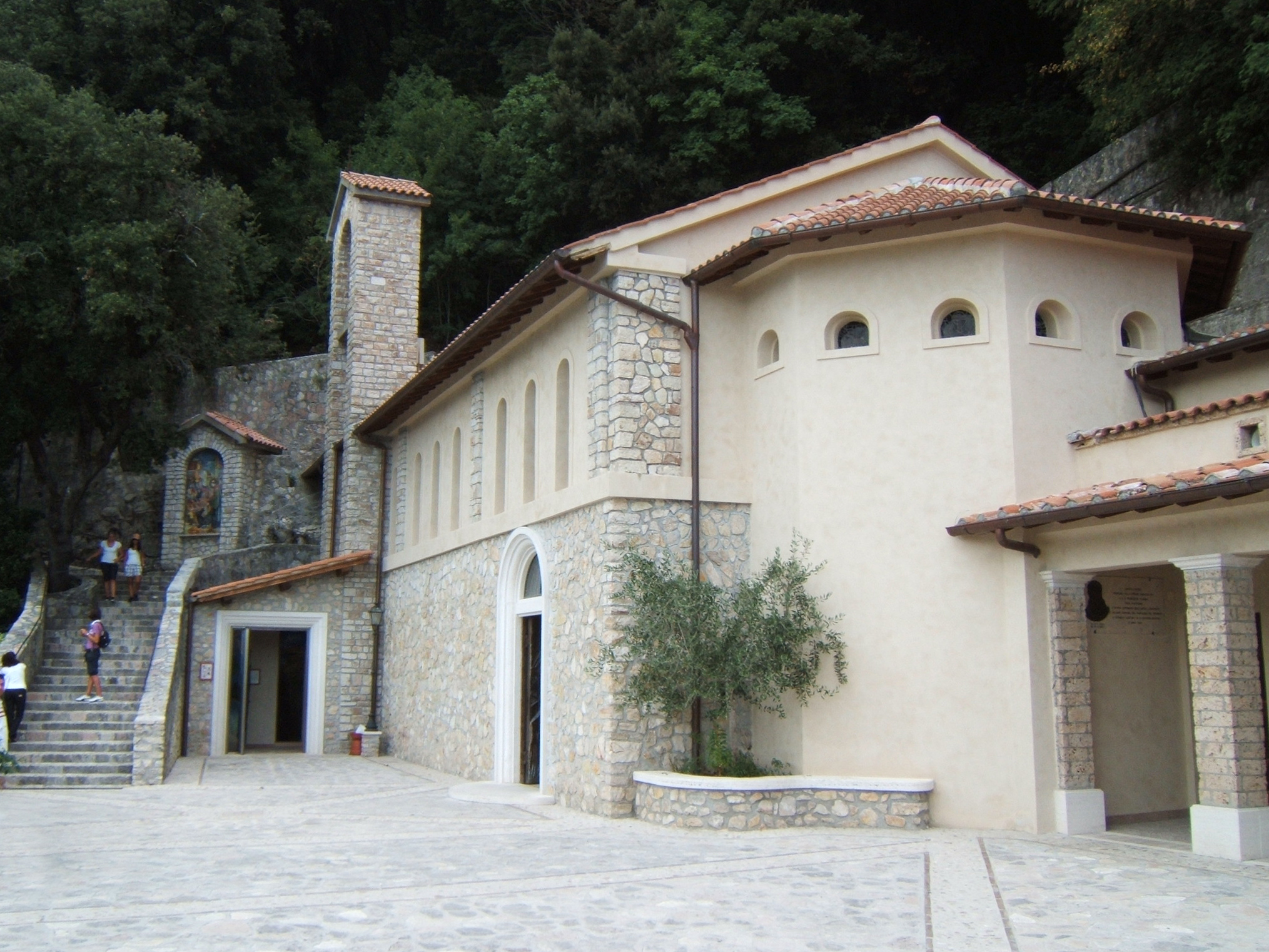
The Church of the Immaculate Conception

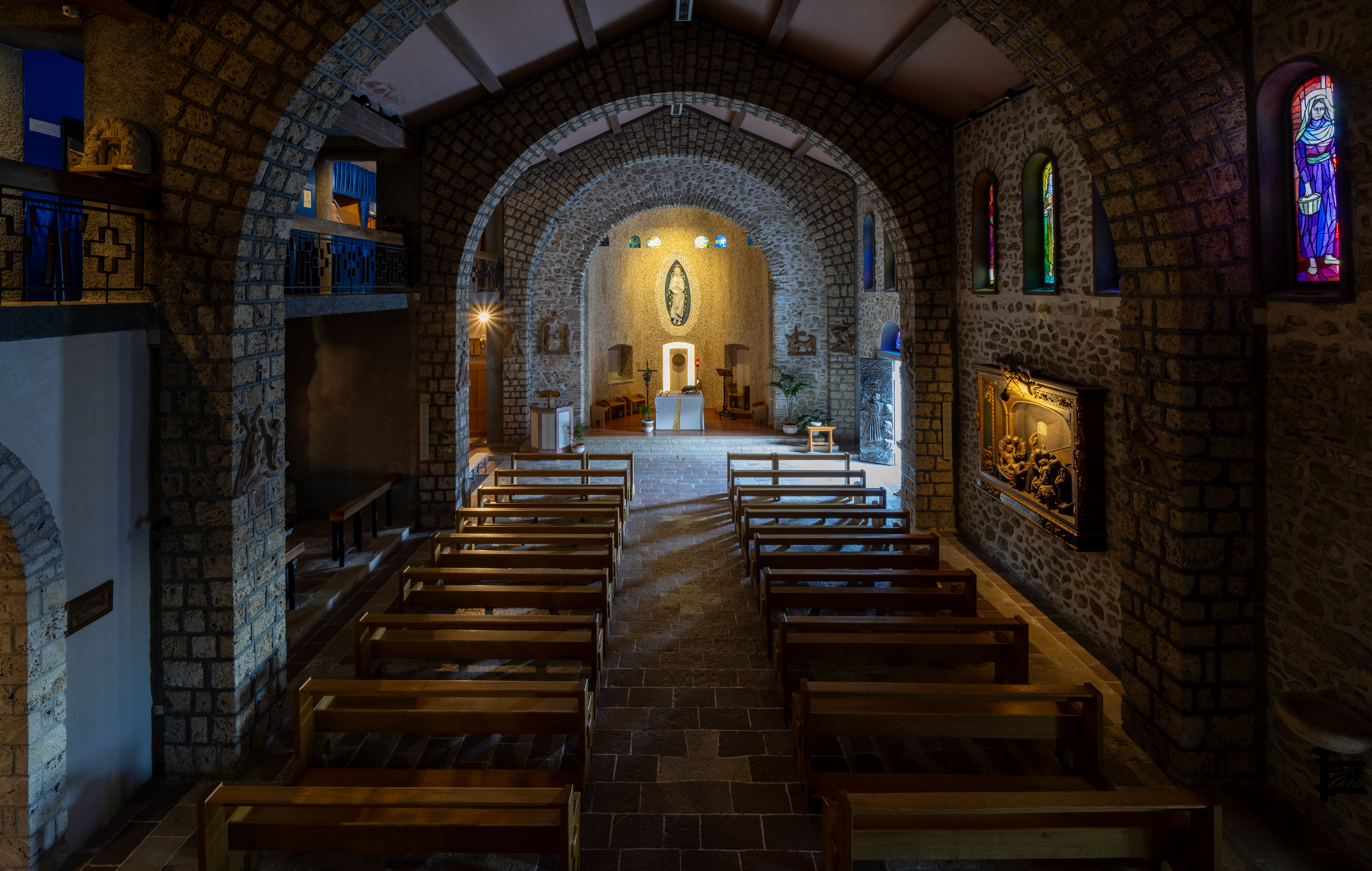
The Church of the Immaculate Conception (chapel)

The Chapel of the First Live Nativity
