= Tuccio d'Andria =

Italian painter

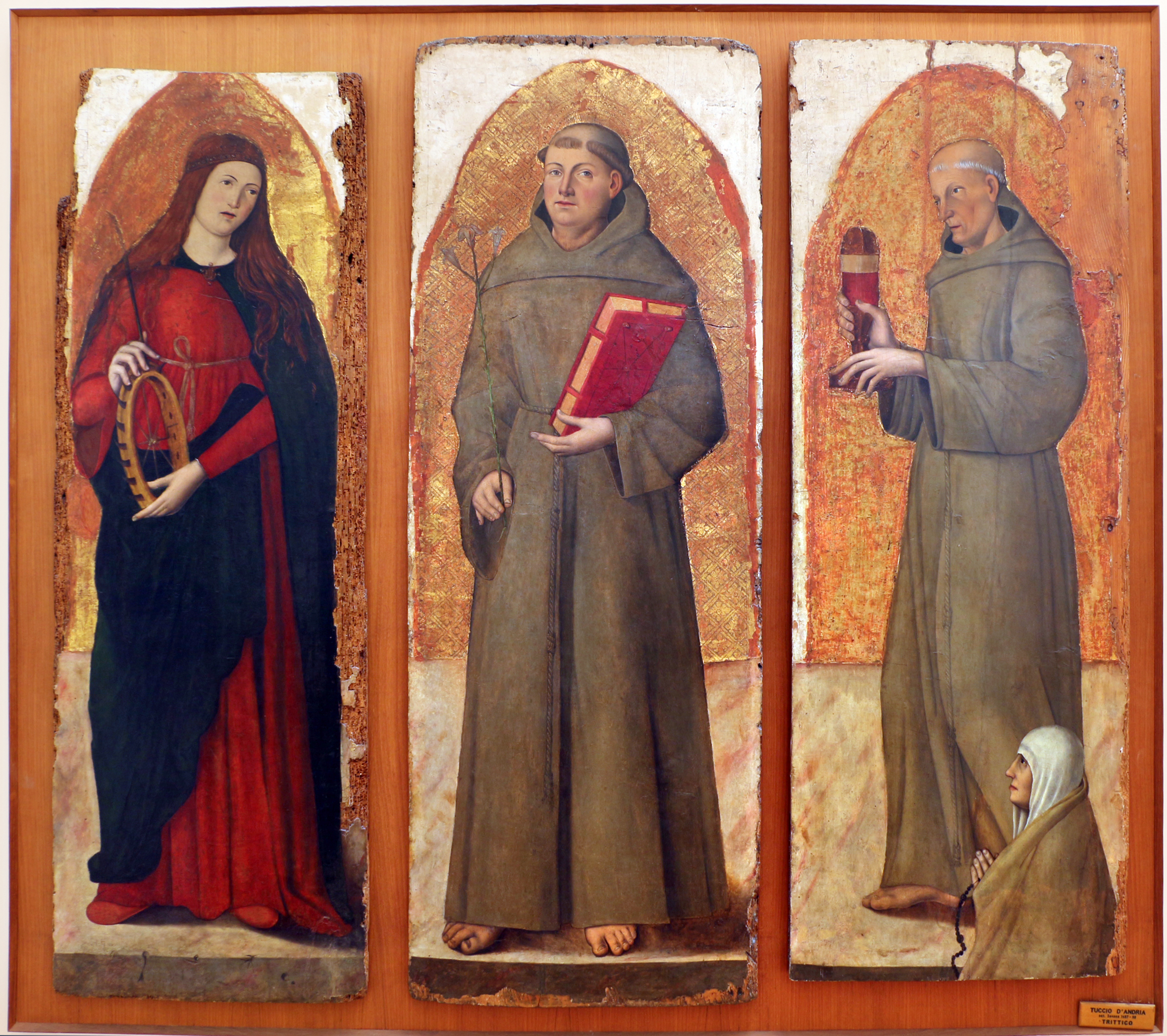
Triptych with Saints Catherine, Anthony, James of the Marches, and Client, c. 1485–90

Tuccio d'Andria or Tuzio d'Andrea (late 15th century) was an Italian painter.

== Biography ==
Little biographical information is known. There is only one signed and dated work from this painter: a Holy Conversation including Saints Pantaleone, Peter Martyr, Apostle Peter, Bonaventure, Jerome, and a Mystical Marriage of Saint Catherine of Alexandria, standing beside Donors from 1487, once found in the San Bonaventure Chapel of the Church of San Giacomo in Savona, but now in the cathedral museum. The Predella has been dispersed and a panel with twelve apostles is now on display in Toulon, France.

Other works attributed to Tuccio include a Holy Conversation made in 1487 for the cathedral of Santa Maria sul Priamar, the cathedral was demolished during the construction of the Priamar Fortress. The Main altarpiece for the church of San Giacomo is attributed to the painter "de Andria de Apulia", and may be Tuccio. Also attributed to Tuccio are two works from the cathedral of Andria: two panels depicting: The Redeemer and Mary Virgin. Finally, a work from the church of San Bernardino in Molfetta and another originally from Santa Maria Vetere in Andria, now in Pinacoteca of Bari, depicting Saints Catherine, Anthony of Padua, and Giacomo della Marca with Donors.
