= Tommaso Maria Ruffo =

Italian Dominican bishop

Servant of God Tommaso Maria Ruffo OP
- Archbishop of Bari-Canosa
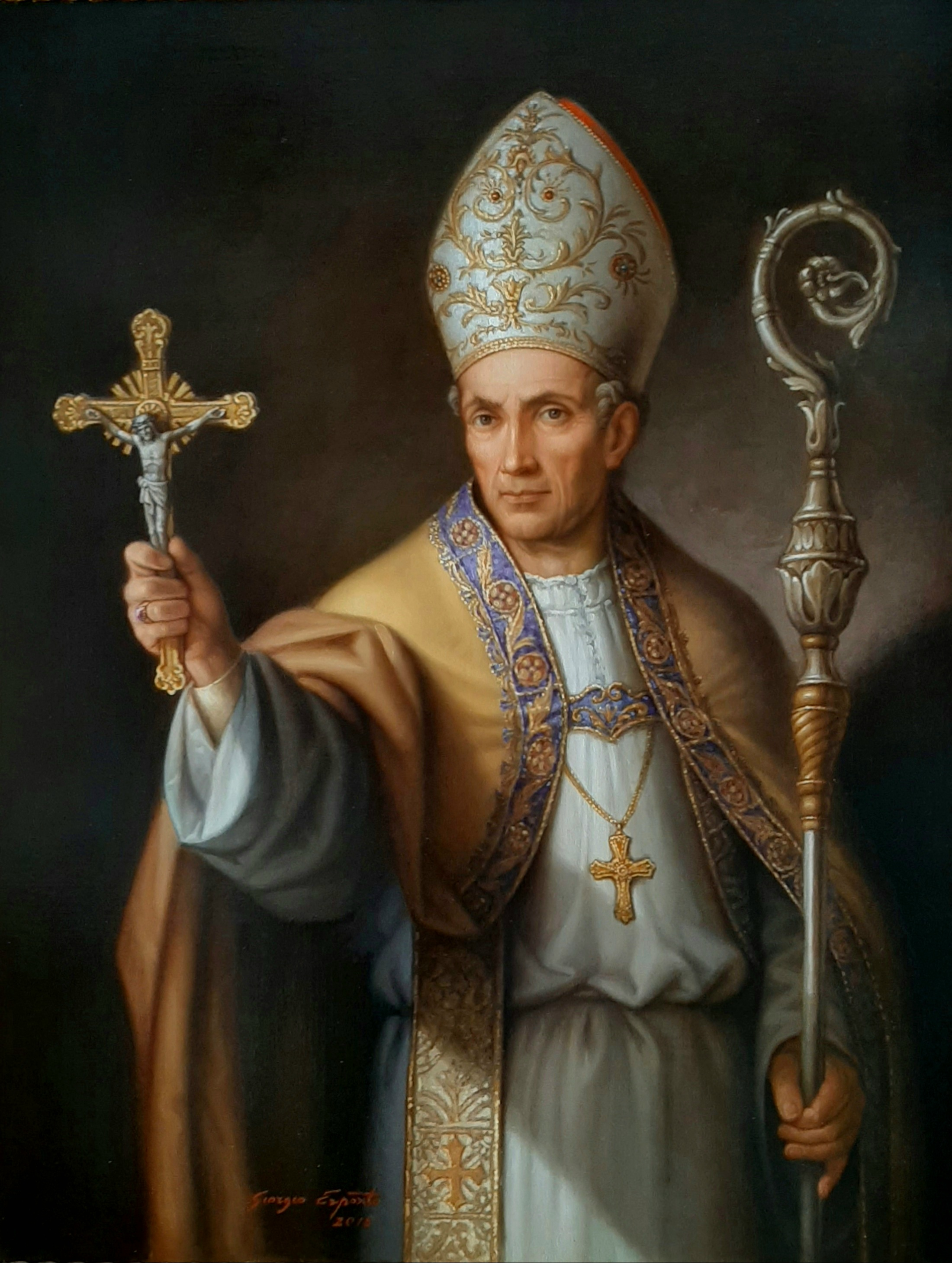
- Portrait of Monsignor Tommaso Maria Ruffo executed by Giorgio Esposito
- See: Bari-Canosa
- Installed: 10 April 1684
- Term ended: 30 April 1691

Orders
- Ordination: 1644
- Consecration: 16 April 1684

Personal details
- Born: Giacomo Ruffo; 6 December 1618 Bagnara Calabra, Reggio Calabria, Italy
- Died: 30 April 1691 (aged 72) Bari, Italy
- Buried: Cathedral of Saint Sabinus
- Denomination: Catholic Church

Tommaso Maria Ruffo, OP (6 December 1618 – 30 April 1691) was an Italian Dominican friar and prelate who served as Archbishop of Bari-Canosa (1684–1691).

== Biography ==
Ruffo was born as Giacomo on 6 December 1618 in Bagnara Calabra to Duke Francesco Ruffo, Prince of Sant' Antimo, and Duchess Giovanna di Santa Croce.

He was educated according to his status and, while undergoing training, he met the Dominican Order which he joined. He professed his vows on 22 July 1635 in the monastery of San Domenico Maggiore in Naples, where he lived for three years and also distinguished himself by providing excellent instruction on logic.

After being ordained in 1644, Ruffo was elected Provincial Prior of southern Italy at just 34 years of age. He was appointed Archbishop of Bari-Canosa on 10 April 1684 by Pope Innocent XI. He carried out an extraordinary reforming effort in Apulia that was centered on putting the Council of Trent's regulations into practice. He also gave important indications both for the life of the female monasteries of the city, the training of candidates for the priesthood, and the expansion of the seminaries.

He died on 30 April 1691 on Bari, Italy. On his deathbed, he ordered the proceeds from the sale of his silverware to be distributed to the poor.

His cause for beatification was opened on 3 August 1745.

Catholic Church titles
Preceded by Giovanni Granafei	Archbishop of Bari-Canosa; 1684–1691	Succeeded by Carlo Loffredo
