= Richard Filangieri =

Italian noble and soldier

Filangieri coat-of-arms

Richard (Riccardo) Filangieri (c. 1195–1254/63) was an Italian nobleman who played an important part in the Sixth Crusade in 1228–9 and in the War of the Lombards from 1229–43, where he was in charge of the forces of Frederick II, Holy Roman Emperor, battling forces on the other side, local barons first led by John of Ibelin, Old Lord of Beirut. During the first half of his career Richard was a Ghibelline, but during the second a Guelph. He was a member of the Filangieri family of Sicily.

== Rise to influence in Italy ==
Richard Filangieri was the eldest son of Giordano I, lord of Nocera, and Oranpiassa. His younger brothers were Giordano II, Lothair, and Henry. He was educated as a knight and married Iacoba, daughter of Pietro Cottone, who had been made count of Lettere and castellan of Gragnano in 1198 by Empress Constance. By his marriage to Iacoba, Richard entered the ranks of the Neapolitan nobility, a traditional caste which had not been much open to Italo-Normans like the Filangieri.

Richard was made imperialis marescalcus (imperial marshal) of the Kingdom of Sicily by the Emperor Frederick II. He held this title as early as 1224, but in most documents thereafter until he lost the post to Tebaldo Francesco (before June 1243, probably 1242) he is titled imperialis aule marescalcus. In 1231 his brother Giordano was appointed to act as marshal in Richard's absence; Richard was then appointed Marshal of Jerusalem. In 1225 Richard joined the court of the emperor at Palermo. In 1226–27 he followed the imperial court around northern Italy: from Rimini, to Parma, to Borgo San Donnino, and then back to the Capitanate. From February to May 1227 he was in Sicily, at the emperor's side in Catania and Palermo again.

== Command in the Crusader states ==
=== Sixth Crusade and the first phase of the Lombard war ===
In April 1227, as part of the Sixth Crusade, Richard left for Acre with 500 knights, mostly Lombards, to augment the 800 already in the Holy Land under the Duke of Limburg, Henry IV. Richard met Frederick in the harbour of Limassol in Cyprus on 21 July 1228. Richard, Odo of Montbéliard, and Hermann von Salza were the commanders of Frederick's Crusade, since none of them were excommunicate (the emperor was). Filangieri was privy to Frederick's prior negotiations with al-Kāmil, the Sultan of Egypt, for the return of Jerusalem, the Holy City. It is for this reason that he punished a group of knights in the spring of 1228 for raiding Muslim territory and returned their booty. Filangieri also rode out nightly to meet secretly with envoys from al-Kāmil, which led some fellow Crusaders to write a complaint to Pope Gregory IX over Frederick's "evil" agents.

Richard was sent back in the fall of 1231 as imperial legate, again with a large army of mostly Lombards. When the War of the Lombards heated up over the interference of Frederick II in the affairs of the Kingdom of Jerusalem, it was Richard who represented the emperor and commanded the imperial troops. He was allied with the Teutonic Knights and Knights Hospitaller. Richard was appointed as bailie to exercise the regency on behalf of Frederick, whose son Conrad II was king. His rights were generally recognised but his personal authority was much circumscribed by the Assizes and the Haute Cour. He made his headquarters at Tyre and he also held Jerusalem.

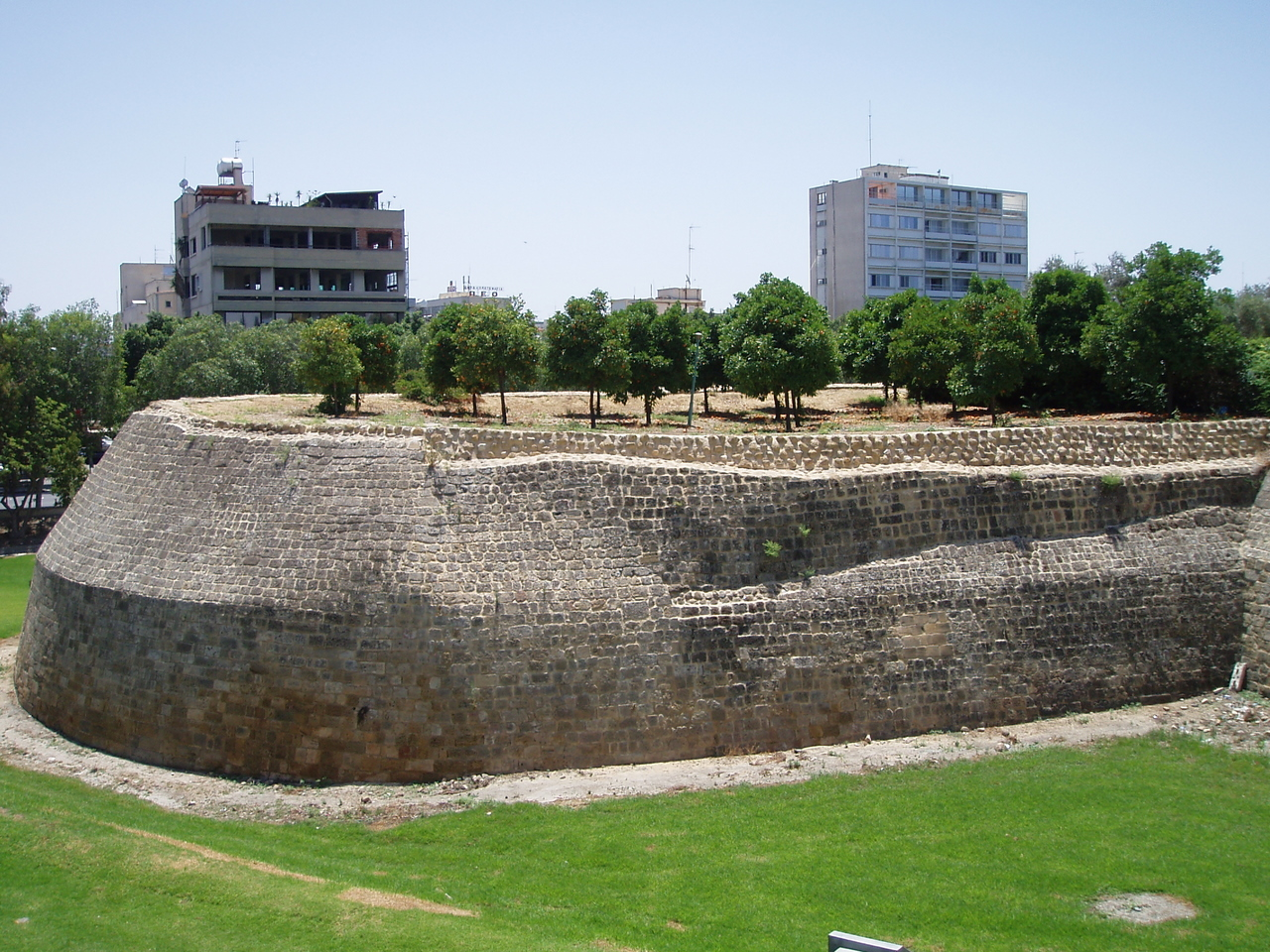
The city walls of Nicosia, which Filangieri fell back on after his defeat at Agridi in June 1232. He later abandoned the city and retreated to Kyrenia.

=== War of the Lombards ===
Frederick had initially attempted to take Cyprus by treachery, forcing the then regent, John of Ibelin, to hand over the regency of the boy king Henry I of Cyprus. However, when Frederick left the island, John reasserted control, and drove off the Imperial forces that attempted to re-take the island. Frederick then sent a fleet, under the command of Richard Filangieri, to the mainland, besieging John's center of power in Beirut. The lower city surrendered under its bishop, Galeran. While the army under his brother Lothair was besieging the citadel, Richard himself went ahead and accepted the submission of Tyre, which he placed under the control of his brother Henry. Before the citadel fell the Haute Cour—to which Richard had recently presented himself as Frederick's bailie—objected to the siege because the laws of the kingdom forbade the sovereign from declaring the forfeiture of a fief without the Cour's consent, which Frederick had not sought before Filangieri assaulted Beirut. Richard ignored their concerns and, after an embassy to Frederick in Italy failed to reverse his policy, the citadel fell. Richard had shown himself beholden to none but Frederick, and this convinced the moderate party that had been instrumental in the truce of 1228 to align themselves with the Ibelines. The war was thus reignited.

In May 1232, in the first major battle of the war, Casal Imbert, Richard defeated his enemies, the House of Ibelin. In June, however, his men were so soundly defeated by an inferior force at the Battle of Agridi in Cyprus that his support on the island evaporated. In 1233 Filangieri sought the alliance of Bohemond V, Prince of Antioch and Count of Tripoli, and Hethum II of Armenia, but to no avail. He requested reinforcements from Frederick, but received none. By then only Tyre remained in imperialist control, though Acre was also nominally imperial under Odo of Montbéliard, who had received half of the divided bailiwick from Frederick in 1236. Odo also had the support of the Haute Cour.

In 1239–40 he was unable to establish contact with the Crusade of Theobald I of Navarre. In 1241 the Hospitallers in Acre were besieged in their fortress by the Templars, who had the support of the commune. A faction of Hospitallers then allied with a faction of the bourgeoisie and conspired with Filangieri to hand the city over to his troops while the Ibelins were away. Filangieri entered the city in disguise but he and the plot were uncovered. Though escaping with his life, he was recalled to Italy by the emperor. Lothair was left in charge in Tyre. The Guelphs in Acre meanwhile had sent a request to Frederick to have Richard replaced as bailie by a man of their choosing: Simon de Montfort, 6th Earl of Leicester.

In 1242 or 1243 Conrad declared his own majority and on 5 June the absentee monarch's regency was granted by the Haute Court to Alice, widow of Hugh I of Cyprus and daughter of Isabella I of Jerusalem. Alice promptly began ruling as if queen, ignoring Conrad, who was in Italy, and ordering Richard arrested. He was shipwrecked and captured while trying to return from Italy to Tyre, leaving his brother Lothair to defend the besieged place. The city fell on 12 June, and the Ibelins seized the citadel on 7 or 10 July, with the help of Alice, whose forces arrived on 15 June.

== First exile from Italy and return ==
Because of Richard's capture and Lothair's surrender, the entire Filangieri family fell into disgrace. Richard was eventually released and returned to Sicily, where he and his brother Henry, with Henry's son Giovanni di Sorrento, were imprisoned in Apulia by the emperor (1242/3). In his Chronicle, the south Italian Richard of San Germano records that Raymond VII of Toulouse met the emperor at Melfi in September 1242 and intervened on behalf of the defeated Filangieri. Frederick allowed Richard and his brothers to accompany the count back to Toulouse (1244). It is possible that Frederick's treatment of Richard and Lothair pushed another brother, Marinus Filangieri, the Archbishop of Bari, out of the imperial and into the Papal camp in the struggle between Guelphs and Ghibellines. It was Marinus who had enlisted the aid of Raymond in securing the release of his brothers.

Richard is recorded with Raymond in southern France in 1249, once at Toulouse and again at Milhaud. In September he was a witness to Raymond's will and attached his signature to it. In 1251, after the death of Frederick in 1250, he returned to Italy. He joined the rebellion of Naples, Capua, and the rest of Campania against Conrad, who was now also King of Sicily. In July he was elected podestà of the commune of Naples, a post in which he is recorded in documents dated between 1 November 1251 and 7 October 1252. On 5 November his successor, Gallo de Orbelli, was in office (until 1253). With his experience, however, Richard was the leader of the defence of Naples for eight months while Conrad besieged it. Forced to surrender, he was exiled a second time.

== Second exile and return ==
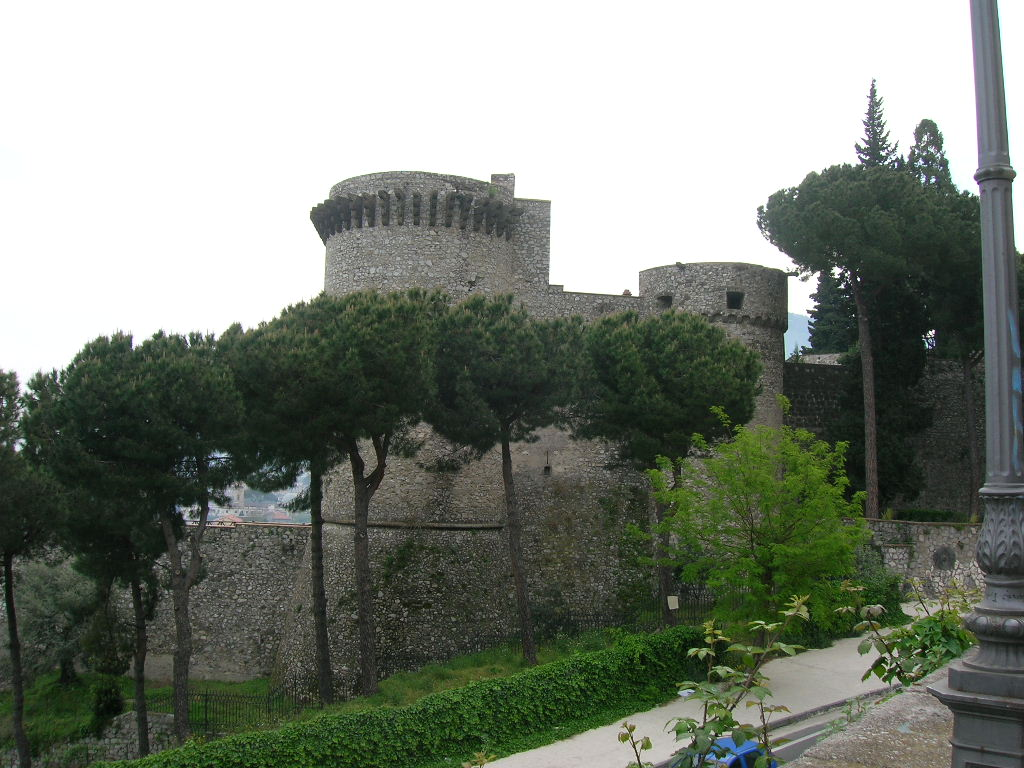
The castle at Castellammare, a hereditary lordship held by Richard jure uxoris (in right of his wife) in the Campania.

From 1253 to 1254 Richard, through the intervention of Pope Innocent IV, was lodged at Ariccia with his nephew Henry, Archbishop-elect of Bari. Richard and Galvano Lancia, another leading nobleman of Sicily, organised a congress of Sicilian nobles at Anagni that year, where they recognised the Pope as their overlord. In October 1254 Innocent confirmed Richard in the barony of the Terra di Lavoro, which Frederick had previously conferred on him; in the county of Lettere and the castle of Gragnano, to which he had a claim through his wife; and in the lordships of Calvi, Castellammare, and Scafati. Richard also held Satriano as regent for his nephew Richard and Riardo as regent for another nephew, Roger.

There is a Ricardus Filangieri recorded under "3 November" in the necrology of Santa Patrizia in Naples, but whether it is this Richard or one of the numerous other Richards of the Filangieri clan is undeciphered. From February 1262 at Lettere a document reads curia nobilis viri domini Riccardi Filangerii, but this is probably a reference to Richard's eponymous son, Richard Filangieri II, sometimes called iunior. By his wife Iacoba, who died in 1271, Richard left one daughter, Isabella, who married Giacomo d'Aquino, lord of Arienzo and Galluccio. Richard was definitely dead by March 1263.
