= Obadiah the Proselyte =

12th-century Italian Jewish musician

Obadiah the Proselyte (Hebrew: עובדיה הגר), also known as Johannes of Oppido (Italian: Giovanni da Oppido) was an early-12th-century Italian convert to Judaism. He is best known for his memoirs and the oldest surviving notation of Jewish music, both unique survivals.

== Biography ==
He was born Johannes, son of Dreux, around 1070 in Oppido Lucano, a small town in South Italy, today in the province of Potenza, Basilicata. He converted to Judaism in 1102. It was common practice for proselytes to choose the name "Obadiah" because of the tradition that Obadiah the prophet was an Edomite converted to Judaism.

His reasons are not entirely clear. It is believed he had been inspired by the Jewish people during the First Crusade, as well as the story of Andreas, the archbishop of Bari who had converted to Judaism circa 1066–1078. Obadiah's understanding of the Bible may have also played a role.

He is known for recording medieval Jewish chant in Gregorian notation. There is a dispute whether this Gregorian melody used is of Jewish origin or of non-Jewish origin.

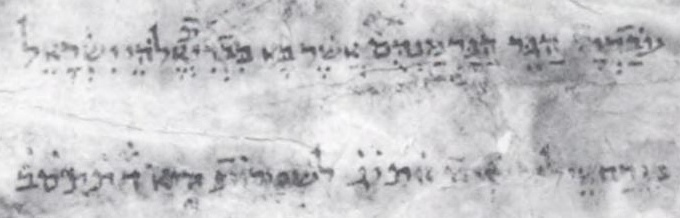
"Obadiah the Norman Proselyte who entered the covenant of the God of Israel in the month of Ellul, year 1413 of Documents which is 4862 of Creation"

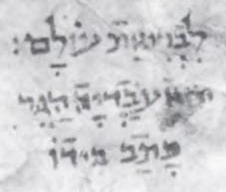
"he, Obadiah the Proselyte, has written [this prayer-book] with his own hand"

Obadiah is known to us exclusively through a variety of documents from the Cairo Geniza, all but one in his own hand. The key piece of evidence for reconstructing his own varied output came from a single colophon leaf, all that remains of a prayer-book, now preserved in the Hebrew Union College, Cincinnati (MS H.U.C. Genizah Collection no. 8). An inscription on the colophon says, in Hebrew, that "Obadiah the Norman proselyte" who converted to Judaism "in the month of Elul" of 1102 has written the prayer-book "with his own hand". So, although in all of his writings he invariably refers to himself in the third person, by directly comparing the handwriting we can be sure that it is indeed he who wrote it.

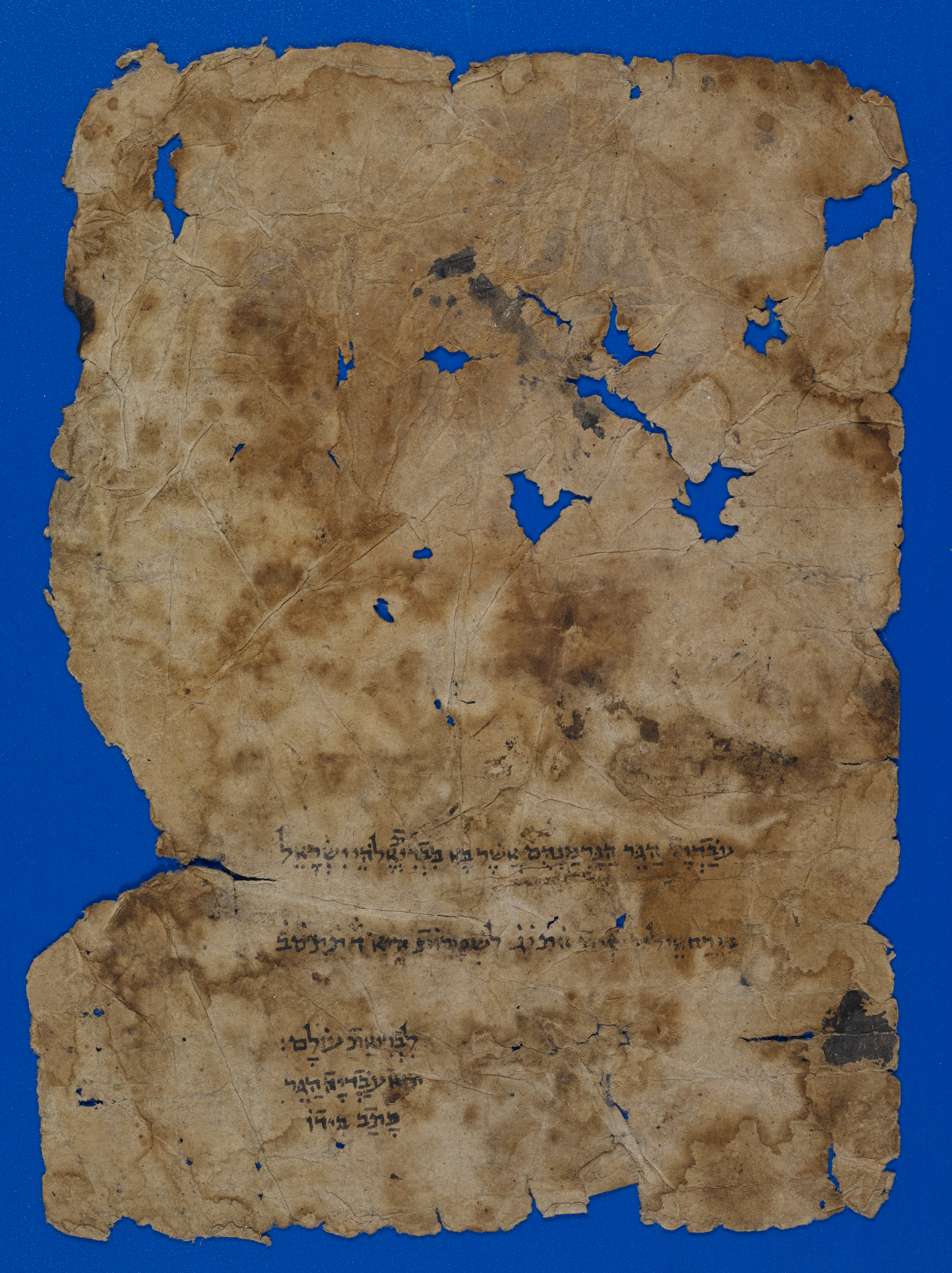
This is a page from a prayer book of Obadiah the Proselyte.

It took scholars over half a century to build a full picture of Obadiah's life and deeds. The name "Obadiah the Proselyte" first came up in 1901 in the second volume of Ginzei Yerushalayim (גנזי ירושלם, Treasures of Jerusalem), a collection of scientific and literary works from rare manuscripts, compiled by Jerusalem rabbi Solomon Aaron Wertheimer, an amateur scholar and small-time Cairo Geniza material trader. From a letter of recommendation written for Obadiah by Baruch ben Isaac, the head of a large yeshivah in the city of Aleppo, Syria, Wertheimer published only the more poetic parts, mostly the lament for the plight of the Palestinian Jews in verse from the introduction; from what remained, hardly anything but the names could be deduced: "This letter was written in his own hand by our mas[ter Baru]kh ... son of ... [Isaac] ... that it might be kept by Obadiah the Proselyte [for use] in all communities of Israel to which he might go." It took another 30 years for the letter first to make its way into the Bodleian Library (where it remains to this day) and then to attract the attention of Hebrew Union College professor Jacob Mann, who published it in its entirety in 1930.

All of the Cairo Geniza documents relevant to the life of Johannes of Oppido = Obadiah the Proselyte are available at a website dedicated to his life and writings.
