= Vitalianus Visconti Borromeo =

Italian Roman Catholic prelate

Most Reverend Vitaliano Visconti Borromeo
- Titular Archbishop of Hadrianopolis in Haemimonto; Apostolic Nuncio to Emperor
- Church: Catholic Church
- In office: 1616–1617
- Predecessor: Placido della Marra
- Successor: Ascanio Gesualdo

Orders
- Consecration: 14 August 1616 by Giambattista Leni

Personal details
- Born: 1591 Milan, Italy
- Died: May 1617 (age 26)

Vitaliano Visconti Borromeo or Vitalianus Visconti Borromeo (1591–1617) was a Roman Catholic prelate who served as Titular Archbishop of Hadrianopolis in Haemimonto (1616–1617) and Apostolic Nuncio to Emperor (1616–1617).

== Biography ==
Vitaliano Visconti Borromeo was born in Milan, Italy in 1591. On 4 July 1616, he was appointed during the papacy of Pope Paul V as Titular Archbishop of Hadrianopolis in Haemimonto. On 14 August 1616, he was consecrated bishop by Giambattista Leni, Bishop of Ferrara, with Galeazzo Sanvitale, Archbishop Emeritus of Bari-Canosa, and Ulpiano Volpi, Archbishop Emeritus of Chieti, serving as co-consecrators. On 25 August 1616, he was appointed during the papacy of Pope Paul V as Apostolic Nuncio to Emperor. He served as Titular Archbishop of Hadrianopolis in Haemimonto and Apostolic Nuncio to Emperor until his death in May 1617.

== External links and additional sources ==
- Cheney, David M. "Nunciature to Emperor (Germany)". Catholic-Hierarchy.org. (for Chronology of Bishops) ^{[self-published]}
- Cheney, David M. "Hadrianopolis in Haemimonto (Titular See)". Catholic-Hierarchy.org. (for Chronology of Bishops) ^{[self-published]}
- Chow, Gabriel. "Titular Metropolitan See of Hadrianopolis in Hæmimonto (Turkey)". GCatholic.org. (for Chronology of Bishops) ^{[self-published]}

Catholic Church titles
Preceded by	Titular Archbishop of Hadrianopolis in Haemimonto; 1616–1617	Succeeded by Cosimo de Torres
Preceded by Placido della Marra	Apostolic Nuncio to Emperor; 1616–1617	Succeeded by Ascanio Gesualdo
