= Enrico Filangieri =

Italian nobleman (died 1258)

Enrico Filangieri (died 10 October 1258) was an Italian nobleman and Dominican friar who served as the archbishop of Bari in the Kingdom of Sicily from May 1252 until his death.

Enrico was a scion of the Filangieri family, the son of Guido, lord of Nocera, and nephew of Marino Filangieri, archbishop of Bari (died 1251). He had two brothers: Pietro (died 1290), a papal chaplain, and Riccardo, who was made count of Marsico by King Manfred. He was born before 1220 and entered the Dominican Order, probably joining the convent established in Naples by Tommaso Agni da Lentini in 1231. He received a higher education, probably also in Naples.

By 1243, Enrico had left the Kingdom of Sicily because of the Emperor Frederick II's hostility to his family. While he was still in exile, he was appointed archbishop of Bari at Perugia on 6 May 1252 by the papal legate Pietro da Collemezzo, acting on the orders of Pope Innocent IV, who ratified the appointment on 10 May. He was unable to take control of his diocese, however, owing to the rebellion launched by his uncle, Riccardo Filangieri, then podestà of Naples.

In Enrico's absence, King Conrad IV, who had succeeded Frederick II in 1250, appointed a German named Conrad to the vacant archdiocese. In March 1253, upon Enrico's request, Innocent quashed all the confirmations and concessions that the anti-bishop Conrad had made. Throughout 1253–54, he stayed with the Roman curia as it travelled between Perugia, Anagni and Rome. In order to give him a salary, Innocent entrusted to him the administration of the vacant bishopric of Albano. In December 1253, the pope gave Enrico the nearby castle of Ariccia. Together these provided him with a living and enough to support his relatives who had gone into exile after the defeat of Riccardo's rebellion.

With Conrad IV's death, Enrico was finally able to visit his diocese. On 3 October 1254, while he was still with the curia at Anagni, he reached an agreement with the chapter of the cathedral of Bari to head off the disputes that had paralyzed the episcopate of his uncle. By November 1254, Manfred, then acting as regent for his nephew, King Conradin, had abandoned the German anti-bishop and recognised Enrico. The latter was consecrated in Bari in 1255.

In March 1256, on the orders of Pope Alexander IV, Enrico transferred Pietro di Cidonio, bishop-elect of Minervino, to the diocese of Canne. In August 1258, Enrico assisted at the coronation of Manfred in Palermo, completing his transformation from enemy of the Staufer dynasty into ally. He died in Naples on 10 October 1258 and was buried in the basilica of San Domenico Maggiore. His death was recorded in the necrology of the church of Santa Patrizia and the libro dei suffragi (book of suffrages) of the cathedral of Bari. In October 1259, Pope Alexander IV ordered that the part of Enrico's inheritance left in San Domenico Maggiore go to his successor at Bari, Giovanni Saraceno, and the part in possession of his brother Pietro be handed over to the Dominican convent at Foggia.

== Sources ==
- Kamp, Norbert (1975). "Frater Henricus Filangerius, O.P.". Kirche und Monarchie im staufischen Königreich Sizilien, 1: Prosopographische Grundlegung: Bistümer und Bischöfe des Königreichs 1194–1266, 2: Apulien und Kalabrien. Munich: Wilhelm Fink. pp. 593–595.
- Kamp, Norbert (1997). "Filangieri, Enrico". Dizionario Biografico degli Italiani. Vol. 47. Rome: Istituto dell'Enciclopedia Italiana.
