= Giovanni Saraceno =

Sicilian archbishop

Giovanni Saraceno (Latin Iohannes Saracenus, sometimes rendered "John the Saracen" in English) was the Archbishop of Bari and Canosa in the Kingdom of Sicily from 1259 until his death on 19 August 1280. He probably belonged to the noble Saraceni family of Rome, who were creditors to the Papacy. His surname possibly indicates he was of Arab descent, but his most recent ancestors belonged to the Papareschi family of Rome. He was thus a relative of Pope Innocent II.

Giovanni was a Franciscan, and he was probably serving as provincial minister of either Rome or Apulia when elected archbishop in 1259. (Note: He was bishop by 25 June that year.) He may also identical to the John of Aversa of Arab descent who was the Franciscan provincial minister of Calabria in 1254. Giovanni's uncle was a proctor of King Henry III of England at the papal curia.

Giovanni took over the Bariot diocese after the death of Archbishop Enrico Filangieri, at a time of open warfare between two claimants to the Sicilian crown. His episcopate was dedicated to reconciling the church with the commune, and balancing the interests of the two great churches of the city, his own Cathedral of San Sabino and the Basilica of San Nicola. In 1267, he rapidly repaired one of the towers of the cathedral after it collapsed during an earthquake.

On 20 November 1267, Giovanni had two city judges authenticate some royal and papal grants to the diocese. Through the courts he recovered some property that belonged to the diocese and had been unlawfully possessed by another. In 1270 he reached an agreement with the 26 canons of his chapter to provide them generously with pastures, vineyards and houses. He signed as "Humble Brother Giovanni, Archbishop of the See of Bari and Canosa" (frater Johannes humilis barine et canusine Sedis Archiepiscopus). Giovanni attended the Second Council of Lyon (1272–74).
