= Apostolic Nunciature to Austria =

Diplomatic Mission of the Holy See

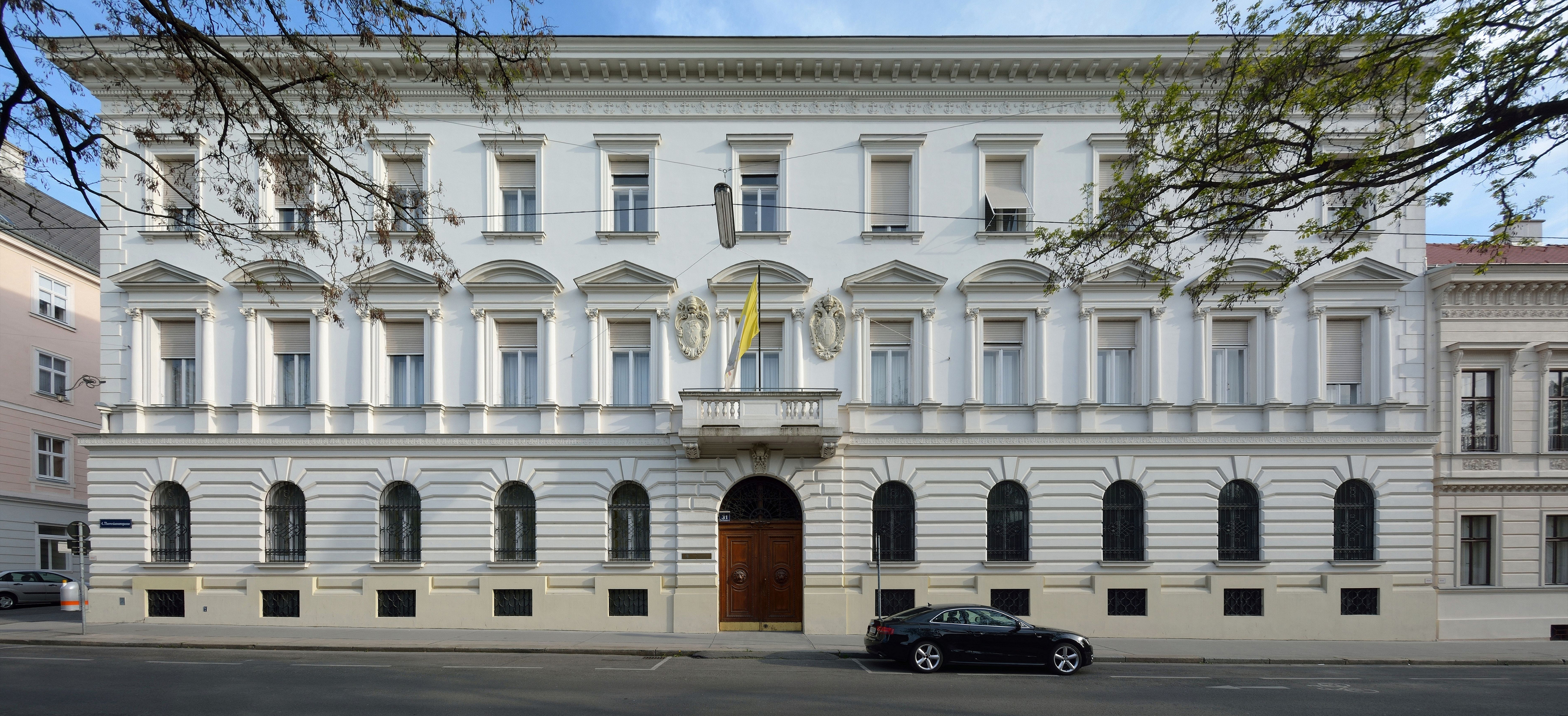
- Location: Vienna
- Apostolic Nuncio: Archbishop Pedro López Quintana

The Apostolic Nuncio to Austria is an ecclesiastical office of the Roman Catholic Church in Austria. It is a diplomatic post of the Holy See, whose representative is called the Apostolic Nuncio with the rank of an ambassador.

It originated as the Apostolic Nunciature to the Emperor of the Holy Roman Empire, which was discontinued in 1800.

== Apostolic Nuncios to Austria ==
- Lorenzo Campeggi (1511 - 1517)
- Marino Ascanio Caracciolo (1517 - 1529)
- Vincenzo Pimpinella (1529 – 1532)
- Pier Paolo Vergerio (1533 – 1535)
- Giovanni Morone (1536 – 1538)
- Fabio Mignanelli (1538 – 1539)
- Giovanni Morone (1539 – 1541)
- Girolamo Verallo (1541 – 1545)
- Fabio Mignanelli (1545)
- Prospero Santacroce (1548 – 1550)
- Girolamo Martinengo (1550 – 1554)
- Zaccaria Delfino (1554 – 1556)
- Antonio Agustí (1558)
- Stanislaus Hosius (1560 – 1561)
- Zaccaria Delfino (1561 – 1565)
- Melchiorre Biglia (1565 – 1571)
- Giovanni Delfino (1571 – 1578)
- Bartolomeo Portia (1578)
- Orazio Malaspina (1578 – 1581)
- Ottavio Santacroce (1581)
- Giovanni Francesco Bonomi (1581 – 1584)
- Germanico Malaspina (1584 – 1586)
- Filippo Sega (1586 – 1587)
- Antonio Puteo (1587 – 1589)
- Alfonso Visconti (1589 – 1591)
- Camillo Caetani, (1591 – 1592)
- Cesare Speciano (1592 – 1597)
- Ferdinando Farnese (1597 – 1598)
- Filippo Spinelli (1598 – 1603)
- Giovanni Stefano Ferreri (1604 – 1607)
- Antonio Caetani (1607 – 1610)
- Giovanni Battista Salvago (1610 – 1612)
- Placido della Marra (1612 – 1616)
- Vitaliano Visconti Borromeo (1616 – 1617)
- Ascanio Gesualdo (1617 – 1621)
- Carlo Carafa (1621 – 1628)
- Giovanni Battista Maria Pallotta (1628 – 1630)
- Ciriaco Rocci (1630 – 1634)
- Malatesta Baglioni (1634 – 1639)
- Gaspare Mattei (1639 – 1644)
- Camillo Melzi (1644 – 1652)
- Scipione Pannocchieschi (1652 – 1658)
- Carlo Carafa della Spina (1658 – 1664)
- Giulio Spinola (1665 – 1667)
- Antonio Pignatelli (1668 – 1671)
- Mario Alberizzi (2 February 1671 – 1675)
- Francesco Buonvisi (1675 – 1689)
- Giacomo Cantelmo (1689 – 1690)
- Sebastiano Antonio Tanara (1692 – 1696)
- Andrea Santacroce (1696 – 1700)
- Gianantonio Davia (26 April 1700 – 1705)
- Giulio Piazza (15 December 1709 – 21 July 1710)
- Giorgio Spinola (26 May 1713 – 20 January 1721)
- Girolamo Grimaldi (1721 – 1730)
- Domenico Silvio Passionei (23 December 1730 – 1738)
- Camillo Paolucci (20 May 1738 – 20 October 1745)
- Fabrizio Serbelloni (1746 – 1754)
- Ignazio Michele Crivelli (1754 – 1760)
- Vitaliano Borromeo (1760 – 1766)
- Antonio Eugenio Visconti (22 November 1766 – 1773 )
- Giuseppe Garampi (16 March 1776 – 1785)
- Giovanni Battista Caprara Montecuccoli (14 February 1785 – 11 August 1793)
- Luigi Ruffo-Scilla (23 August 1793 – 9 August 1802)
- Antonio Gabriele Severoli (October 1801 – 8 March 1816)
- Paolo Leardi (23 September 1816 – 31 December 1823 Died)
- Ugo Pietro Spinola (14 November 1826 – 1832 )
- Pietro Ostini (2 September 1832 – 11 July 1836)
- Lodovico Altieri (18 July 1836 – 1845)
- Michele Viale-Prelà (7 May 1845 – 28 September 1855 )
- Antonio Saverio De Luca (9 September 1856 – 28 December 1864)
- Mariano Falcinelli Antoniacci, O.S.B. (14 August 1863 – 1873)
- Luigi Jacobini (27 March 1874 – 16 December 1880 )
- Serafino Vannutelli (3 December 1880 – 14 March 1887)
- Luigi Galimberti (23 May 1887 – 25 June 1894)
- Antonio Agliardi (12 June 1893 – 1896)
- Emidio Taliani (24 July 1896 – 1903)
- Gennaro Granito Pignatelli di Belmonte (4 January 1904 – 6 January 1911)
- Alessandro Bavona (1911 – 19 January 1912 )
- Raffaele Scapinelli di Leguigno (27 January 1912 – 1916)
- Teodoro Valfre di Bonzo (13 September 1916 – 6 March 1920)

Apostolic Nuncios to Austria

- Francesco Marchetti Selvaggiani (4 December 1920 – 15 December 1922)
- Enrico Sibilia (16 December 1922 – 1935)
- Gaetano Cicognani (13 June 1935 – 16 May 1938)

Diplomatic relations ceased from the Anschluss until 1946.
Apostolic Internuncios to Austria

- Maurilio Silvani (4 November 1946 – 22 December 1947)
- Giovanni Battista Dellepiane (12 January 1949 – 13 August 1961)
  - Title changed to apostolic nuncio on 21 December 1951

Apostolic Nuncios to Austria

- Opilio Rossi (25 September 1961 – 10 December 1976 )
- Mario Cagna (11 May 1976 – 4 December 1984)
- Michele Cecchini (4 December 1984 – 26 April 1989 )
- Donato Squicciarini (1 July 1989 – 8 October 2002 )
- Giorgio Zur (8 October 2002 – 26 July 2005 )
- Edmond Farhat (26 July 2005 – 14 January 2009 )
- Peter Stephan Zurbriggen (14 January 2009 – 30 November 2018)
- Pedro López Quintana (4 March 2019 – present)

== See also ==
- Foreign relations of the Holy See
- List of diplomatic missions of the Holy See
- Roman Catholicism in Austria
