= Apostolic Nunciature to Flanders =

Former diplomatic post of the Holy See (1593–1634, 1725-1795)

The Apostolic Nunciature to Flanders was the diplomatic mission of the Holy See to the Habsburg Netherlands (a predecessor state of modern Belgium commonly referred to as "Flanders" from its component part, the County of Flanders). The diplomatic representative entrusted with this mission was an Apostolic Nuncio with the rank of an ambassador. The office came into existence in 1593 but fell into abeyance after 1634. It was recreated in 1725 and continued to 1795, ending with the annexation of the Austrian Netherlands to France.

Between 1727 and 1794 the Apostolic Nuncios to Flanders ruled directly the Dutch Mission, the missionary district in Northern Netherlands, then the Dutch Republic.

== Nuncios ==
=== Spanish Netherlands ===
- Ottavio Mirto Frangipani 1596–1606
- Decio Carafa 1606–1607
- Guido Bentivoglio 1607–1615
- Ascanio Gesualdo 1615–1617
- Lucio Morra 1617–1619
- Lucio Sanseverino 1619–1621
- Giovanni Francesco Guidi di Bagno 1621–1627
- Fabio Lagonissa 1627–1634
- Lelio Falconieri 1635–1637 (appointed but never presented)
- Richard Paul Stravius, internuncio, 1634–1642

=== Austrian Netherlands ===
- Giuseppe Spinelli 1725–1731
- Silvio Valenti Gonzaga 1731–1736
- Luca Melchiore Tempi 1736–1744
- Ignazio Michele Crivelli 1744–1754
- Tommaso Maria Ghilini 1763–1775
- Ignazio Busca 1775–1785
- Cesare Brancadoro 1792–1795

== See also ==
- Apostolic Nunciature to Belgium
