= Decio Caracciolo Rosso =

Roman Catholic prelate

Most Reverend Decio Caracciolo Rosso
- Archbishop of Bari (-Canosa)
- Church: Catholic Church
- Diocese: Archdiocese of Bari (-Canosa)
- In office: 1606–1613
- Predecessor: Galeazzo Sanvitale
- Successor: Ascanio Gesualdo

Orders
- Consecration: 1 October 1606 by Giovanni Battista Costanzo

Personal details
- Died: 27 May 1613 Bari, Italy

Decio Caracciolo Rosso (died 27 May 1613) was a Roman Catholic prelate who served as Archdiocese of Bari (-Canosa) (1606–1613).

== Biography ==
On 21 September 1577, Decio Caracciolo Rosso was ordained to the priesthood. On 3 July 1606, during the papacy of Pope Paul V, he was appointed to the Archdiocese of Bari-Canosa. On 1 October 1606, he was consecrated bishop by Giovanni Battista Costanzo, Archbishop of Cosenza, with Alessandro Cospi, Bishop of Bisceglie, and Giovanni Antonio Viperani, Bishop of Giovinazzo, serving as co-consecrators. He served as Bishop of Bari (-Canosa) until his death on 27 May 1613.

While bishop, he was the principal co-consecrator of Fulvio Tesorieri, Bishop of Belcastro (1612) and Selvaggio Primitelli, Bishop of Lavello (1613).

== External links and additional sources ==
- Cheney, David M. "Archdiocese of Bari-Bitonto". Catholic-Hierarchy.org. (for Chronology of Bishops) ^{[self-published]}
- Chow, Gabriel. "Metropolitan Archdiocese of Bari–Bitonto (Italy)". GCatholic.org. (for Chronology of Bishops) ^{[self-published]}

Catholic Church titles
Preceded by Galeazzo Sanvitale	Archdiocese of Bari-Canosa; 1606–1613	Succeeded by Ascanio Gesualdo
