= Marino Filangieri =

Marino Filangieri (died 6 July 1251) was an Italo-Norman nobleman who served as the archbishop of Bari in the Kingdom of Sicily from 21 December 1226 until his death.

Marino was a son of Giordano Filangieri, lord of Nocera in the Kingdom of Sicily. His elder brothers were Richard Filangieri, Giordano the younger, Lothair, and Henry. His brothers were all high-ranking officials in Sicily under king of Sicily and Holy Roman Emperor Frederick II, and in the crusader Kingdom of Jerusalem, which was governed by Frederick on behalf of his infant son Conrad.

Marino became a canon in the archdiocese of Salerno, then studied law at the University of Bologna, where he received the degree of magister. In 1224 he published a gloss of the Apparatus of Ugolinus, a commentary on the Roman Corpus Iuris Civilis. He was appointed as archbishop of Bari by Pope Honorius III in 1226. The appointment of Marino and other bishops in the Kingdom of Sicily offended Frederick, who believed he had the right to appoint bishops in the kingdom and that Honorius' appointments were "arbitrary."

Frederick II promised to go on crusade in 1227, but was forced to turn back to Italy when a plague spread through his fleet. In response, the new Pope Gregory IX excommunicated Frederick. Marino was one of Frederick’s ambassadors, along with archbishop Lando of Reggio, sent to negotiate with Gregory, but the pope refused to lift the excommunication.

Frederick resumed his crusade the next year in 1228 and Marino joined him. After landing in Acre, Frederick II sent him back to Italy to inform the pope of his safe arrival and the progress of the crusade. While Frederick was gone, Gregory invaded the emperor’s territory in Italy (the War of the Keys). Marino was one of the ambassadors between the emperor and the pope who tried to re-establish peace between them when Frederick returned in 1229. Along with Lando of Reggio, Thomas of Capua, Hermann of Salza, and other ambassadors, Marino helped negotiate the Treaty of San Germano to end the war in 1230.

Marino’s brothers Richard and Lothair represented Frederick as imperial baillis in Tyre, but they were expelled by the nobles of the Kingdom of Jerusalem in 1242. Frederick imprisoned Richard and Lothair upon their return to Italy, and Marino helped negotiate their release along with Raymond VII, Count of Toulouse. Afterward the brothers were allowed to live in exile in Toulouse. These events seem to have offended Marino and turned him against the emperor. He participated in the First Council of Lyon in 1245, during which Pope Innocent IV deposed Frederick as emperor and king.

Frederick died in 1250 and Innocent IV sent Marino back to the Kingdom of Sicily to help stir up a rebellion against Frederick’s sons, who hoped to succeed him. However Marino died soon afterwards in 1251. He was succeeded as archbishop by his nephew Enrico Filangieri.

== Sources ==
- Kamp, Norbert (1975). "Marinus Filangerius". Kirche und Monarchie im staufischen Königreich Sizilien, 1: Prosopographische Grundlegung: Bistümer und Bischöfe des Königreichs 1194–1266, 2: Apulien und Kalabrien. Munich: Wilhelm Fink. pp. 586–592.
- Kamp, Norbert (2002). "The bishops of southern Italy in the Norman and Staufen periods". The Society of Norman Italy, ed. Graham A. Loud and Alex Metcalfe. Leiden: Brill. pp. 185–212.
- Pybus, H.J. (1930). "The emperor Frederick II and the Sicilian church." The Cambridge Historical Journal, vol. 3, no. 2.
- Van Cleve, Thomas Curtis (1972). The Emperor Frederick II of Hohenstaufen: Immutator Mundi. Oxford: Oxford University Press.
