= Andreas (archbishop of Bari) =

Italian archbishop (died 1078)

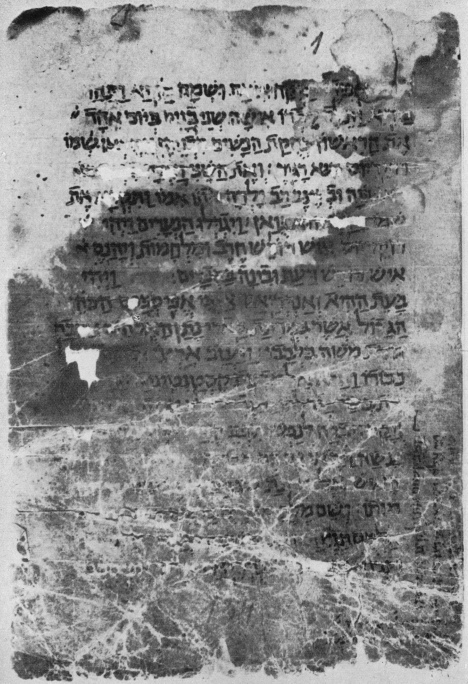
This fragment of the memoirs of Obadiah the Proselyte tells the story of Andreas's conversion to Judaism

Andreas (or Andrew) was the Archbishop of Bari from 1062 to at least 1066, and probably somewhat longer. In 1066, he travelled to Constantinople where at some point he converted to Judaism. He then fled to Muslim-ruled Egypt and remained there until his death in 1078.

== Life ==
Andreas is attested in the ecclesiastical records of the Archbishopric of Bari, but very cursorily: Anonymi Barensis Chronicon, early-12th-century Bariot chronicle covering the years 855–1118, mentions his elevation to archbishop in 1062, journey to Constantinople in 1066, and dying in 1078.

Obadiah the Proselyte, another convert to Judaism and émigré to Egypt of about a generation later, was moved and inspired by Andreas's story, and recorded it in his memoirs. This autobiography, popularly known as the "Obadiah Scroll", was preserved in the Cairo Geniza, a collection of some 350,000 documents that accumulated in the Ben Ezra Synagogue in Old Cairo, Egypt, from the 9th to 19th centuries, and since dispersed among libraries and collections around the world. In the course of the 20th century, fourteen fragments of the Scroll, now in Budapest, Cambridge and New York, were identified. The fragments in the Kaufmann Genizah Collection, Library of the Hungarian Academy of Sciences, Budapest, were discovered by Alexander Scheiber, the director of the Budapest University of Jewish Studies, who published them in 1954. In one of the fragments, Obadiah tells the story that was widely discussed when he was still Johannes, young son of minor nobility, living with his parents in the small Italian town of Oppido Lucano:

It happened at that time regarding Archbishop Andraeas the high priest in the city of Bari, that the Lord put the love of the Torah of Moses into his heart. He forsook his land, his priesthood and all his glory and came to the city of Constantinople, where he circumcised the flesh of his foreskin.

There passed over him sufferings and hardships; he arose and fled for his life from before the uncircumcised seeking to slay him; but the Lord God of Israel saved him from their hands in purity. Many went up after him and, observing his deeds, they did as he had done — they also entered the covenant of the living God.

Then went the man to the metropolis of Egypt and dwelled there until the day of his death. The name of the king of Egypt in those days was al-Mustansir, and the name of his vezir was Badr al-Jamali.

The report concerning Archbishop Andraeas reached unto the entire land of Lombardy and unto the sages of Greece and the sages of Rome, which is the place of the throne of the kingdom of Edom. The Greek sages and all the sages of Edom were ashamed when they heard the report about him.

In the Middle Ages only two high-profile cases are known of Catholic clergy converting to Judaism:

- From the Annals of St. Bertin we learn that in 838 Frankish deacon Bodo converted to Judaism, fled the Aachen court of Louis the Pious, and settled in Muslim Spain. While there, he engaged in a theological debate with Álvaro of Córdoba, Jewish convert to Christianity (some of the letters they exchanged still survive).
- In De diversitate temporum, Benedictine chronicler Alpert of Metz records the story of Wecelinus, a cleric in the service of Conrad I, Duke of Carinthia, relative of the Holy Roman Emperor Henry II. In the year 1005 or 1006, Wecelinus converted, went to live with the Jews of Mainz, and even publicly polemicized against Christianity; one short tract, preserved by Alpert, enraged the Emperor enough to appoint his own court cleric to refute it. A few years later, in 1012, Henry II expelled all the Jews from the city of Mainz, albeit for a short time.
