= Byzantius (archbishop of Bari) =

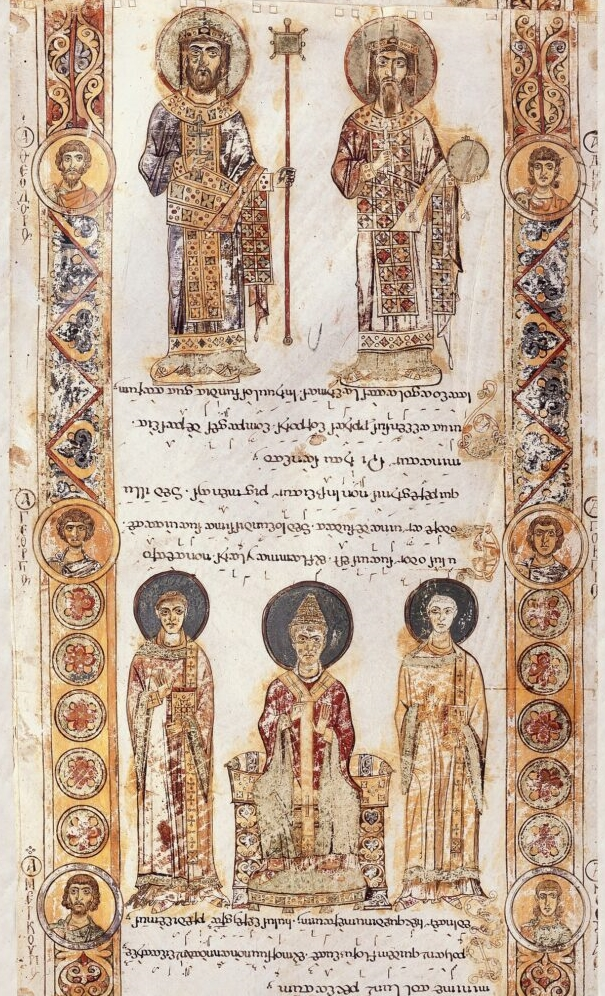
Depiction of the Byzantine emperors and the pope, from an exultet roll commissioned by Byzantius

Byzantius (died 1035) was the archbishop of Bari in the early eleventh century. He began the construction of the new cathedral, which was continued by his successors.

In 1025, the Byzantine catepan of Italy, Basil Boioannes, reorganised the structure of the catepanate and, at the request of Byzantius, authorised the reattachment of Bari to the see of Rome. In order to raise his diocese to provincial status and retain his archiepiscopal title, Byzantius received, in accordance with Roman interpretation of Pseudo-Isidore, a bull of Pope John XIX granting him the privilege of appointing the requisite twelve suffragan bishops of a provincial archdiocese. The only known appointment he made, however, was of one Andrew to a new see at Cannae.
