= Lucio Sanseverino =

Italian cardinal

Lucio Sanseverino (1565–1623) was an Italian cardinal of the Roman Catholic Church.

== Life ==
Sanseverino was born in Naples in 1565, the son of Giovanni Giacomo Sanseverino, count of Saponara, and Cornelia Pignatelli, marchioness of Cerchiaro.

After work as a referendary of the Apostolic Signatura under Pope Gregory XIII, he was elected archbishop of Rossano on 2 December 1592, and consecrated on 21 December. On 19 November 1612 he was translated to the archbishopric of Salerno. From June 1619 to May 1621 he served as papal nuncio in Flanders.

In July 1621 he was created cardinal by Pope Gregory XV. He took part in the conclave of 1623 that elected Pope Urban VIII, and died in Salerno on 25 December the same year. He was buried in his cathedral.

Catholic Church titles
Preceded by Juan Beltrán Guevara y Figueroa	Archbishop of Salerno; 1612–1623	Succeeded by Gabriel Trejo Paniagua
Preceded by Lucio Morra	Papal nuncio to Flanders; 1619–1621	Succeeded by Giovanni Francesco Guidi di Bagno
