= Giovanni Granafei =

Roman Catholic prelate

Most Reverend Giovanni Granafei
- Archbishop of Bari (-Canosa)
- Church: Catholic Church
- Diocese: Archdiocese of Bari (-Canosa)
- In office: 1666–1683
- Predecessor: Diego Sersale
- Successor: Tommaso Marie Ruffo
- Previous post: Bishop of Alessano (1653–1666)

Orders
- Consecration: 22 June 1653 by Marcantonio Franciotti

Personal details
- Born: 1605 Brindisi, Italy
- Died: 18 March 1683 (aged 77–78) Bari, Italy

Giovanni Granafei (1605 – 18 March 1683) was a Roman Catholic prelate who served as Archdiocese of Bari (-Canosa) (1666–1683) and Bishop of Alessano (1653–1666).

== Biography ==
Giovanni Granafei was born in Brindisi, Italy in 1605. On 9 June 1653, he was appointed during the papacy of Pope Innocent X as Bishop of Alessano. On 22 June 1653, he was consecrated bishop by Marcantonio Franciotti, Cardinal-Priest of Santa Maria della Pace, with Giambattista Spada, Titular Patriarch of Constantinople, and Ranuccio Scotti Douglas, Bishop Emeritus of Borgo San Donnino, serving as co-consecrators. On 11 October 1666, he was appointed during the papacy of Pope Alexander VII as Archdiocese of Bari (-Canosa). He served as Bishop of Bari (-Canosa) until his death on 18 March 1683. While bishop, he was the principal consecrator of Annibale Sillano, Bishop of Castro di Puglia (1653).

== External links and additional sources ==
- Cheney, David M. "Diocese of Alessano". Catholic-Hierarchy.org. (for Chronology of Bishops) ^{[self-published]}
- Chow, Gabriel. "Titular Episcopal See of Alessano (Italy)". GCatholic.org. (for Chronology of Bishops) ^{[self-published]}
- Cheney, David M. "Archdiocese of Bari-Bitonto". Catholic-Hierarchy.org. (for Chronology of Bishops) ^{[self-published]}
- Chow, Gabriel. "Metropolitan Archdiocese of Bari–Bitonto (Italy)". GCatholic.org. (for Chronology of Bishops) ^{[self-published]}

Catholic Church titles
Preceded by Francesco Antonio Roberti	Bishop of Alessano; 1653–1666	Succeeded by Andrea Tontoli
Preceded by Diego Sersale	Archdiocese of Bari (-Canosa); 1666–1683	Succeeded by Tommaso Maria Ruffo
