= Guido Bentivoglio =

Italian cardinal and statesman (1579-1644)

His Eminence Guido Bentivoglio
- Cardinal-Bishop
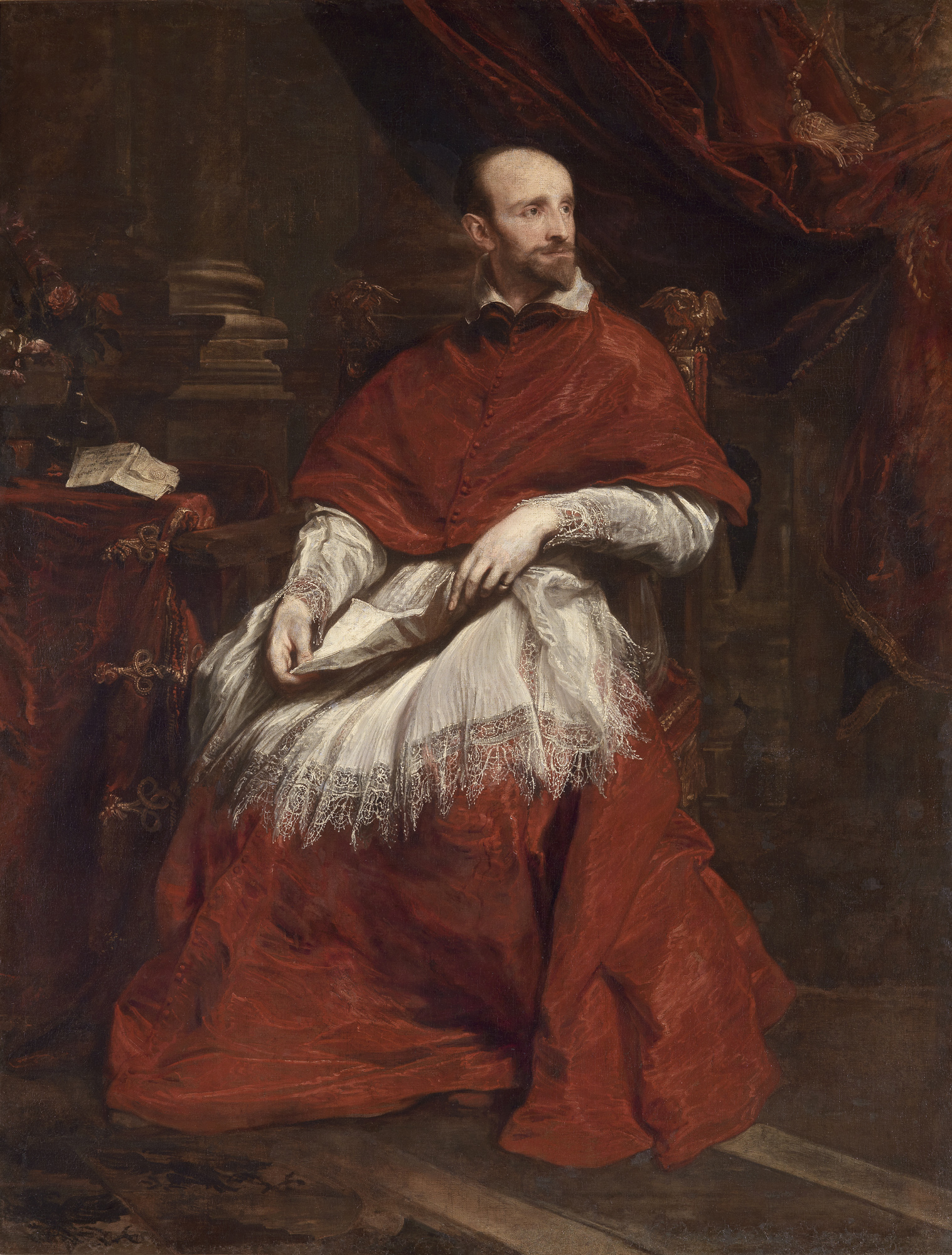
- Cardinal Bentivoglio, by Anthony van Dyck (Palazzo Pitti)
- Church: Catholic Church
- In office: 1641-1644

Orders
- Created cardinal: 11 January 1621 by Pope Paul V
- Rank: Cardinal-Bishop of Palestrina

Personal details
- Born: October 4, 1579 Ferrara, Duchy of Ferrara
- Died: 7 September 1644 (aged 64) Rome, Papal States
- Buried: San Silvestro al Quirinale

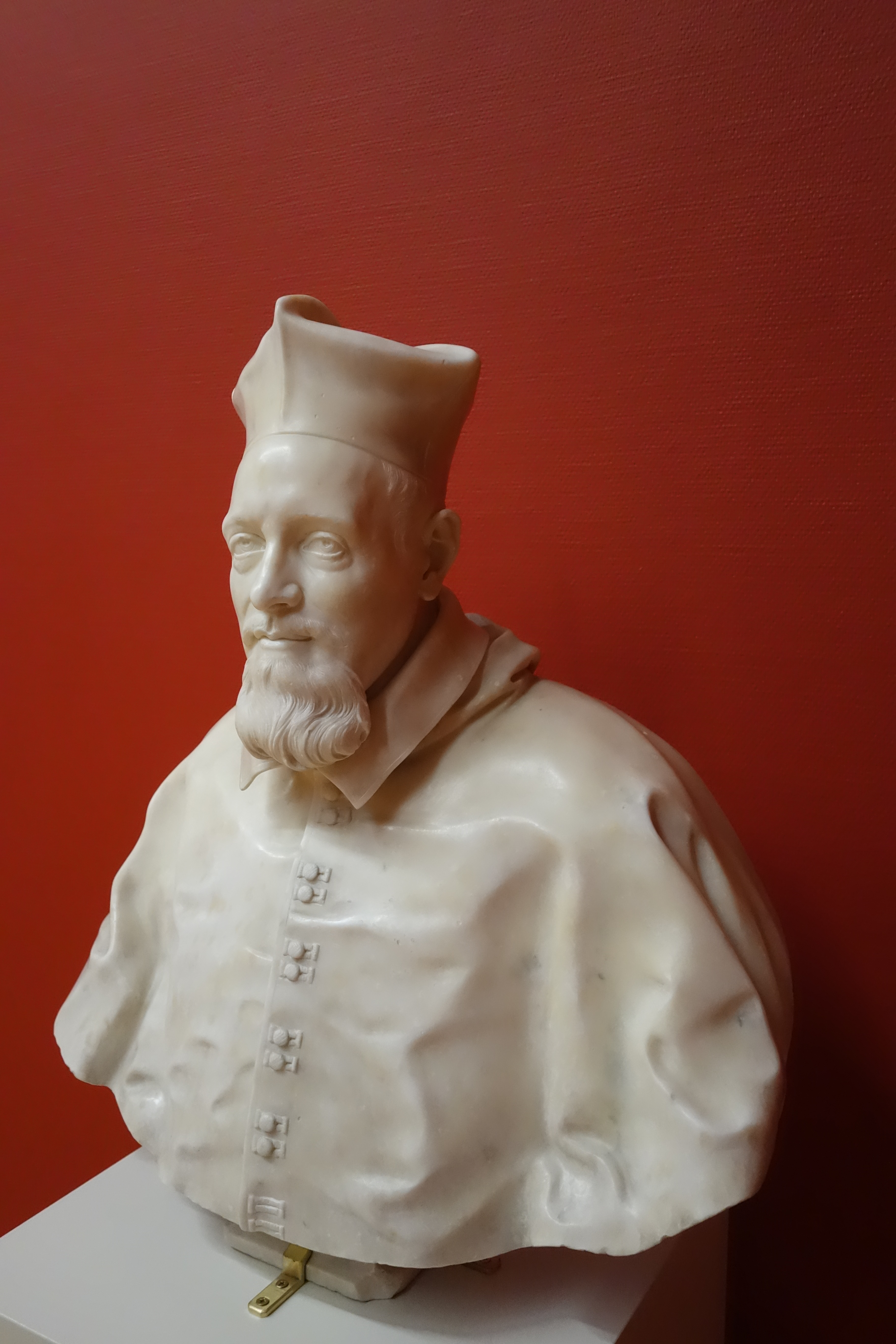
Bust of Cardinal Guido Bentivoglio, by François Duquesnoy, (National Gallery of Ireland)

Guido Bentivoglio d'Aragona (4 October 1579 – 7 September 1644) was an Italian cardinal, statesman and historian.

== Early years ==
A member of the Ferrara branch of the influential Bentivoglio family of Bologna, he was the younger son of marchese Cornelio Bentivoglio and Isabella Bendidio. After studying at the universities of Ferrara and Padua, where in 1598 he received a doctorate utroque jure in both civil and canon law, he returned to Ferrara, to the humanistic studies that honed his elegant writing style. There Pope Clement VIII, on a visit to the city that had recently fallen under direct papal control, made him his private chamberlain, and he returned with Clement to Rome.

== Nuncio in Brussels and Paris ==
Under Clement's successor, Pope Paul V, he was appointed titular archbishop of Rhodes, 14 May 1607, with a dispensation for being three months shy of the canonical age and not having yet received the sacred orders, in order to give him appropriate credentials as nuncio at the court of the Archdukes Albert and Isabella in the Habsburg Netherlands, (1 June 1607 – 24 October 1615).

He arrived in Brussels when negotiations between the Habsburgs and the Dutch Republic to end the Eighty Years' War were about to begin. Following the conclusion of the Twelve Years' Truce in April 1609, he was greatly concerned with the position of Catholicism in the Republic. Accredited to a Habsburg court, he likewise took a keen interest in the final stages of the reign and the succession of Emperor Rudolf II. Three more topics occupied a great deal of his time: the struggle over the Jülich-Cleves inheritance, which was set to ignite the Thirty Years War, the flight of the prince de Condé from France in objection to Henri IV's divorce and remarriage, and the degree of toleration for Catholics in England and Ireland under James I. His correspondence reveals Bentivoglio as "the skilled diplomatist, polished by constant intercourse with the most refined society, as well as the mature observer," according to Ludwig Pastor.

Afterwards he was nuncio to the Court of France (9 July 1616 – 1621), where he witnessed the uproars of the Regency of Queen Marie de' Medici, the fall of Concino Concini in the coup operated by Louis XIII and his favorite Charles d'Albert, the discord between the Queen-Mother and her son and the first Huguenot rebellions. The King rewarded his services as nuncio with the appointment on 11 July 1622 to the bishopric of Riez, a position from which Bentivoglio would resign on 16 October 1625.

== Cardinal in Rome ==
In accordance to custom, Bentivoglio was made a cardinal on 11 January 1621 at the end of his mission at the Court of France. His first titular church was the San Giovanni a Porta Latina (installed 17 May 1621). He subsequently switched to the Santa Maria del Popolo (installed 26 October 1622), the Santa Prassede (installed 7 May 1635) and the Santa Maria in Trastevere (installed 28 March 1639). On 1 July 1641, his intimate friend, Pope Urban VIII appointed him to the suburbicarian see of Palestrina. Until his nomination to the order of cardinal-bishops, Louis XIII and Cardinal Richelieu had entrusted him with the post of Cardinal protector of France.

On 22 June 1633, Cardinal Bentivoglio was one of the signers of the papal condemnation of Galileo. An able writer and skilful diplomat, Bentivoglio was marked out as Urban's successor, but he died suddenly after the opening of the 1644 Papal conclave. He is buried in the church of San Silvestro al Quirinale, Rome. The complete edition of his works was published at Venice in 1668.

== Patron of the arts ==
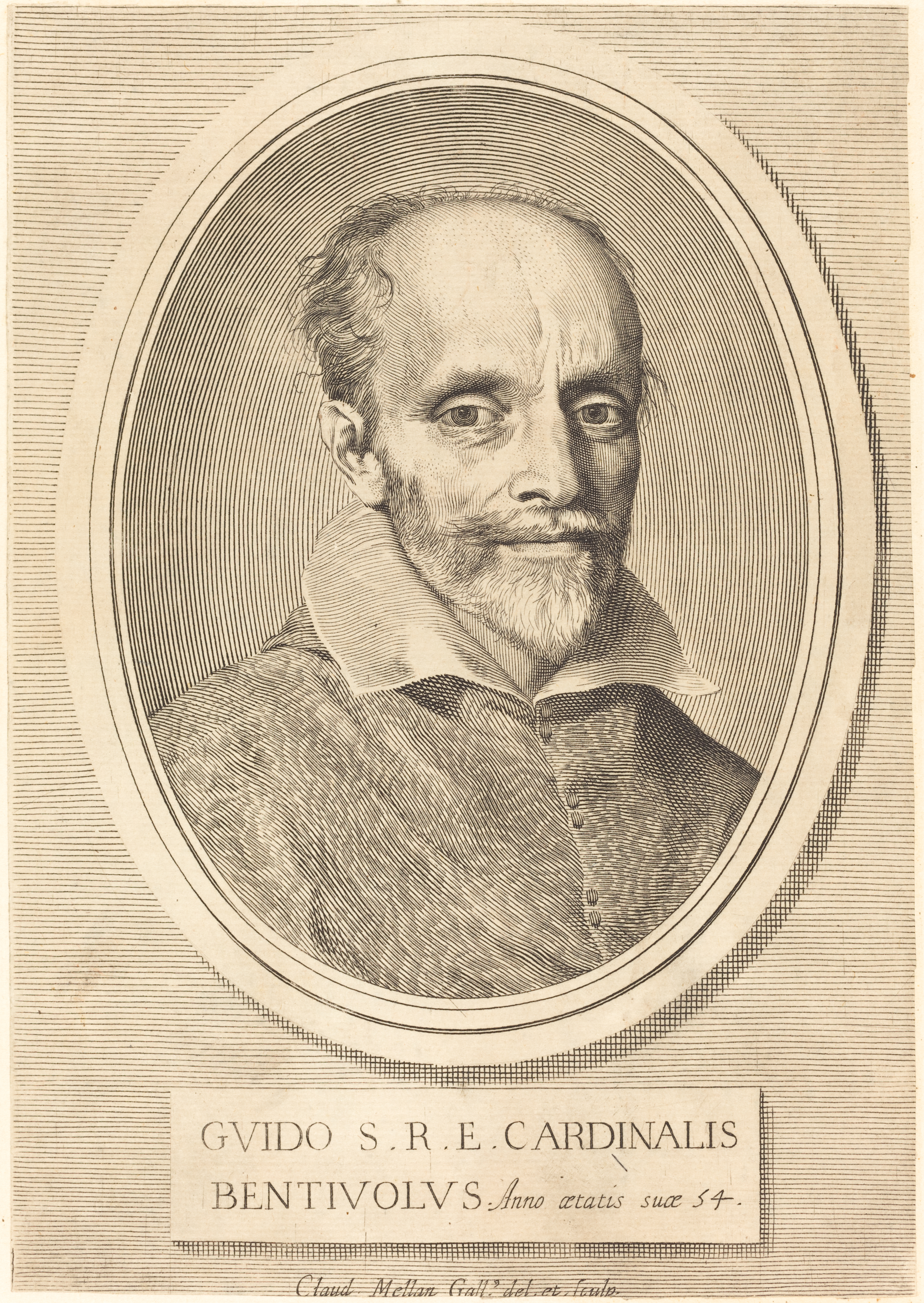
Claude Mellan, Guido Bentivoglio, engraving on laid paper, National Gallery of Art

Bentivoglio was a famous connoisseur and patron of artists. A music enthusiaste, he took Girolamo Frescobaldi with him to Brussels as his household composer. In Brussels and Paris, he collected paintings, tapestries and tapestry cartoons for his patron, Cardinal Scipione Borghese. On his return to Rome in 1621 Bentivoglio bought Cardinal Borghese's new palazzo on the Quirinale. For the palace he commissioned decorations from various artists, including, from 1623 to 1627, Andrea Camassei, who painted a Cupid and Psyche, Filippo Napoletano, who painted a frieze of landscapes and marines, and Giovanni da San Giovanni, who painted mythological scenes.

Guido was most noted, however, for his patronage of northern European artists working in Rome. In 1623, he commissioned Anthony van Dyck to paint his portrait and also a Crucifixion. His portrait bust was sculpted by François Duquesnoy "Il Fiammingo", a Flemish sculptor active in Rome. In 1633, Bentivoglio commissioned an engraved portrait from Claude Mellan and in 1640, arranged for landscape paintings by François Perrier and Herman van Swanevelt to be included among several pictures commissioned for Francesco I d'Este, Duke of Modena. He was an influential supporter of Claude Lorrain: Lorrain's biographer Filippo Baldinucci reported also that Bentivoglio was one of the first Roman patrons to visit Claude's studio and that he introduced this artist's work to Pope Urban VIII.

Guido's interest in music and literature led him also to patronize several composers and to correspond with poets, including Giambattista Marino. There are many references to the visual arts in his letters and memoirs, although these are seldom qualified by artists’ names. His writings reveal his extraordinary sensitivity to landscape and a mind attracted equally to the magnificent and the simple: the grandeur of Venice and the fresh and verdant landscapes of northern Europe.

His collection was partly dispersed, either sold with the Palazzo Bentivoglio on the Quirinal (later bought by Cardinal Mazarin) or given away. The remainder was inherited by his nephew Annibale (? 1610–69 ), papal nuncio to Florence, from whom the portrait by van Dyck passed into the collection of the Medici family.

== Works ==
- Della guerra di Fiandria (best edition, Cologne, 1633–1639). Bentivoglio's three volumes were translated in 1654, by Henry Carey, 2nd Earl of Monmouth (The Compleat History of the Warrs of Flanders, London, Humphrey Moseley, 1654)
- Relazioni di G. Bentivoglio in tempo delle sue Nunziature di Fiandria e di Francia (Antwerp, 1639; Cologne, 1630)
- Lettere diplomatiche di Guido Bentivoglio (Brussels, 1631).
- Raccolta de Lettere Scritte dal Signor Cardinal Bentivoglio in tempo delle sut Nuntiature do Fiandra, e di Francia. (Posthumously by Angelo Zon, Venetia, 1670).
- Costantino Panigada, ed. (1934). Memorie e Lettere. Scrittori d'Italia Laterza. Bari: Laterza.

== Sources ==
- Belvederi, Raffaele (1947). Guido Bentivoglio, Diplomatico. Rovigo: Centro di Cultura "Aldo Masieri".
- Haskell, Francis (1963). Patrons and Painters: A Study in the Relations between Italian Art and Society in the Age of the Baroque. London: Chatto & Windus. pp. 48–50.
- Francis, Albert N. (1986). "Autobiografia e Storia Nelle 'Memorie' Del Cardinale Giulio Bentivoglio". Annali d'Italianistica. 4: 91–108. JSTOR 24004421.

Catholic Church titles
Preceded by Giovanni Garzia Mellini	Titular Archbishop of Colossae; 1607–1622	Succeeded by
Preceded by Decio Carafa	Papal nuncio to Flanders; 1607–1615	Succeeded by Ascanio Gesualdo
Preceded by Roberto Ubaldini	Papal nuncio to France; 1616–1621	Succeeded by Bernardino Spada
Preceded by Francesco Vendramin	Cardinal-Priest of San Giovanni a Porta Latina; 1621–1622	Succeeded by Francesco Cherubini
Preceded by Guillaume Aléaume	Bishop of Riez; 1622–1625	Succeeded by François de La Fare
Preceded by Filippo Filonardi	Cardinal-Priest of Santa Maria del Popolo; 1622–1635	Succeeded by Lelio Biscia
Preceded by Roberto Ubaldini	Cardinal-Priest of Santa Prassede; 1635–1639	Succeeded by Giulio Roma
Preceded by Giulio Savelli (1574-1644)	Cardinal-Priest of Santa Maria in Trastevere; 1639–1641	Succeeded by Cosimo de Torres
Preceded by Pier Paolo Crescenzi	Cardinal-Bishop of Palestrina; 1641–1644	Succeeded by Alfonso de la Cueva
