= Placido della Marra =

Most Reverend Placido della Marra
- Bishop of Melfi e Rapolla
- Church: Catholic Church
- Diocese: Diocese of Melfi e Rapoll
- In office: 1595–1620
- Predecessor: Matteo Brumani
- Successor: Desiderio Scaglia
- Previous post: Apostolic Nuncio to the Emperor (1612–1616)

Orders
- Consecration: 2 April 1595 by Giulio Antonio Santorio

Personal details
- Born: 1560 Naples, Italy
- Died: 2 December 1620 (age 60)

Placido della Marra (1560 – 2 December 1620) was a Roman Catholic prelate who served as Bishop of Melfi e Rapolla (1595–1620) and Apostolic Nuncio to the Emperor (1612–1616).

== Biography ==
Placido della Marra was born in Naples, Italy in 1560. On 6 March 1595, he was appointed during the papacy of Pope Clement VIII as Bishop of Melfi e Rapolla. On 2 April 1595, he was consecrated bishop by Giulio Antonio Santorio, Cardinal-Priest of Santa Maria in Trastevere, with Flaminio Filonardi, Bishop of Aquino, and Leonard Abel, Titular Bishop of Sidon serving as co-consecrators.

On 21 July 1612, he was appointed during the papacy of Pope Paul V as Apostolic Nuncio to the Emperor where he served until his resignation on 25 August 1616.

He served as Bishop of Melfi e Rapolla until his death on 2 December 1620. While bishop, he was the principal consecrator of Melchior Klesl, Bishop of Wien, and the principal co-consecrator of Bartolomeo Cesi (cardinal), Archbishop of Conza.

== External links and additional sources ==
- Cheney, David M. "Diocese of Melfi-Rapolla-Venosa". Catholic-Hierarchy.org. (for Chronology of Bishops) ^{[self-published]}
- Chow, Gabriel. "Diocese of Melfi-Rapolla-Venosa (Italy)". GCatholic.org. (for Chronology of Bishops) ^{[self-published]}
- Cheney, David M. "Nunciature to Emperor (Germany)". Catholic-Hierarchy.org. (for Chronology of Bishops) ^{[self-published]}

Catholic Church titles
Preceded by Giovanni Battista Salvago	Apostolic Nuncio to the Emperor; 1612–1616	Succeeded by Vitaliano Visconti Borromeo
Preceded by Matteo Brumani	Bishop of Melfi e Rapolla; 1595–1620	Succeeded by Desiderio Scaglia
