= Lucio Morra =

Italian bishop and papal diplomat

- Archdiocese: Otranto
- See: Santa Maria Annunziata
- In office: 1606–1623
- Predecessor: Marcello Acquaviva
- Successor: Diego Lopez de Andrada
- Other post: Papal nuncio to Flanders (1617–1619)

Personal details
- Born: c. 1570
- Died: 1623

Lucio Morra (c. 1570–1623) was an Italian bishop and papal diplomat.

== Life ==
Morra, from a noble family in the Kingdom of Naples, was educated at the University of Rome. On 20 November 1606 he was appointed archbishop of Otranto.

On 27 June 1617 Pope Paul V appointed him papal nuncio to the Brussels court of the Archdukes Albert and Isabella, with responsibility for the missions in England and Holland as well as the Catholic Church in the Southern Netherlands. He arrived in Brussels in August 1617.

In 1619 he returned to Italy for family reasons, being replaced as nuncio by Lucio Sanseverino. He died in Italy in 1623.

Catholic Church titles
Preceded by Marcello Acquaviva	Archbishop of Otranto; 1606–1623	Succeeded by Diego Lopez de Andrada
Preceded by Ascanio Gesualdo	Papal nuncio to Flanders; 1617–1619	Succeeded by Lucio Sanseverino
