= Bust of Cardinal Guido Bentivoglio =

Marble sculpture by an unknown artist

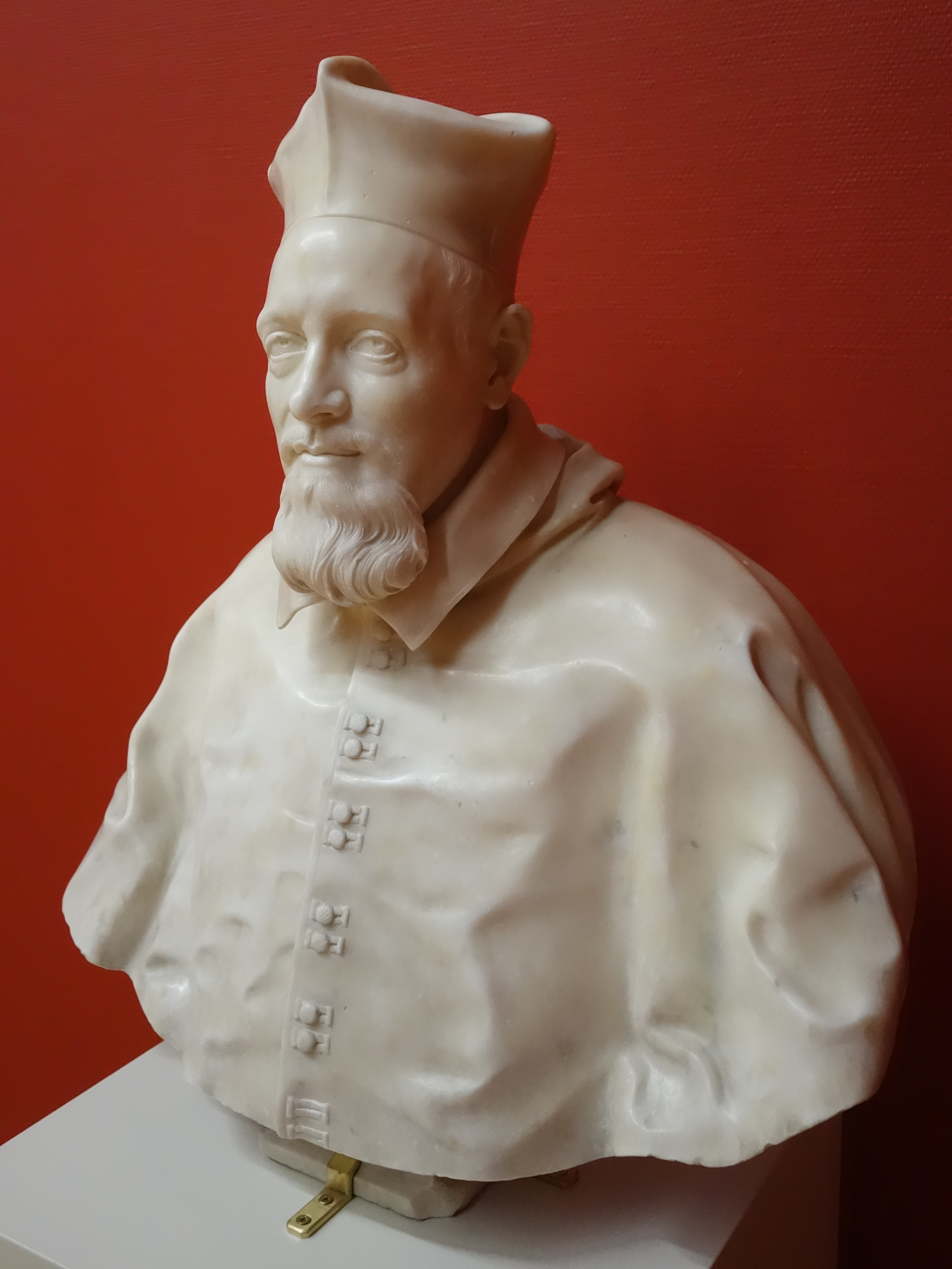
- Artist: Formerly attributed to François Duquesnoy
- Year: After 1638
- Catalogue: NGI.8030
- Type: Sculpture
- Medium: Marble
- Subject: Guido Bentivoglio
- Dimensions: 78.5 cm × 33.5 cm (30.9 in × 13.2 in)
- Location: National Gallery of Ireland; Dublin; 53.340914°N 6.252554°W

The Bust of Cardinal Guido Bentivoglio is a marble sculpture by an unknown artist active in Rome in the 1630s. It was formerly attributed to the Flemish sculptor François Duquesnoy. It was realized after 1638, possibly around 1641, and is currently housed at the National Gallery of Ireland.

Bentivoglio was nuncio in Brussels from 1607 to 1615. He later was entrusted with the post of Cardinal Protector of France in Rome. In Rome, he came into contact with the artists Peter Paul Rubens and Anthony van Dyck, who belonged to the same circle as François Duquesnoy. Bentivoglio was a patron of Flemish artists in Rome. He was also an intimate collaborator of Pope Urban VIII. Duquesnoy had become Urban's protégé in 1626.

The bust is relatively static, with carefully carved details such as the pouches under the Cardinal's eyes. The sitter was identified by comparing the bust with a portrait of Bentivoglio by Van Dyck.
