= Diego Sersale =

Roman Catholic prelate

Most Reverend Diego Sersale
- Archbishop of Bari-Canosa
- Church: Catholic Church
- Diocese: Archdiocese of Bari-Canosa
- In office: 1638–1665
- Predecessor: Ascanio Gesualdo
- Successor: Giovanni Granafei

Orders
- Consecration: 21 December 1638 by Alessandro Cesarini (iuniore)

Personal details
- Died: 14 July 1665 Bari, Italy

Diego Sersale (died 14 July 1665) was a Roman Catholic prelate who served as Archdiocese of Bari-Canosa (1638–1665).

== Biography ==
On 20 December 1638, Diego Sersale was appointed during the papacy of Pope Urban VIII as Archdiocese of Bari-Canosa. On 21 December 1638, he was consecrated bishop by Alessandro Cesarini (iuniore), Cardinal-Deacon of Sant'Eustachio, with Tommaso Carafa, Bishop Emeritus of Vulturara e Montecorvino, and Giovanni Battista Altieri, Bishop Emeritus of Camerino, serving as co-consecrators. He served as Bishop of Bari-Canosa until his death on 14 July 1665.

== Episcopal succession ==
While bishop, he was the principal co-consecrator of:

- Andrea Borgia, Bishop of Segni (1643);
- Alfonso Maurelli, Archbishop of Cosenza (1643);
- Antonio Marullo, Archbishop of Manfredonia (1643);
- Alessandro Pallavicini, Bishop of Borgo San Donnino (1660); and
- Francisco Antonio Díaz de Cabrera, Bishop of Salamanca (1660).

== See also ==
- Catholic Church in Italy

== External links and additional sources ==
- Cheney, David M. "Archdiocese of Bari-Bitonto". Catholic-Hierarchy.org. (for Chronology of Bishops) ^{[self-published]}
- Chow, Gabriel. "Metropolitan Archdiocese of Bari–Bitonto (Italy)". GCatholic.org. (for Chronology of Bishops) ^{[self-published]}

Catholic Church titles
Preceded by Ascanio Gesualdo	Archdiocese of Bari-Canosa; 1638–1665	Succeeded by Giovanni Granafei
