= Ascanio Gesualdo =

Roman Catholic prelate

Most Reverend Ascanio Gesualdo
- Archbishop of Bari (-Canosa)
- Church: Catholic Church
- Diocese: Archdiocese of Bari-Canosa
- In office: 1613–1638
- Predecessor: Decio Caracciolo Rosso
- Successor: Diego Sersale

Personal details
- Died: 27 January 1638 Bari, Italy

Ascanio Gesualdo (died 27 January 1638) was a Roman Catholic prelate who served as Archbishop of Bari (1613–1638), Titular Patriarch of Constantinople (1618–1638), and Apostolic Nuncio to the Emperor (1617–1621).

== Biography ==
Gesualdo was born in Naples in the later sixteenth century, the son of Michele Gesualdo and Maria Caracciolo. In 1609 he became a referendary of the Apostolic Signatura.

On 1 July 1613, during the papacy of Pope Paul V, he was appointed to the Archdiocese of Bari-Canosa. On 21 October 1615 he was appointed papal nuncio to the Brussels court of the Archdukes Albert and Isabella. On 17 June 1617, he was transferred to Prague as Apostolic Nuncio to the Emperor.

On 25 June 1618, he was appointed by Pope Paul V as Titular Patriarch of Constantinople. On 17 April 1621, he resigned as imperial nuncio. He arrived in Bari on 19 March 1622 and dedicated himself full-time to his duties as Bishop of Bari. He held diocesan synods in 1624 and 1628. He remained Titular Patriarch of Constantinople until his death on 27 January 1638.

He died in Bari, where he was buried in the cathedral.

== Episcopal succession ==
Episcopal succession of Ascanio Gesualdo

While bishop, he was the principal co-consecrator of:

- Cesare Ventimiglia, Bishop of Terracina, Priverno e Sezze (1615);
- Giovanni Battista Lancellotti, Bishop of Nola (1615);
- Adam Nowodworski, Bishop of Kamyanets-Podilskyi (1615);
- Vincenzo Caputo, Bishop of San Severo (1615);
- Girolamo Pignatelli, Archbishop of Rossano (1615); and
- Vincenzo Periti, Bishop of Lavello (1615).

== External links and additional sources ==
- Cheney, David M. "Nunciature to Emperor (Germany)". Catholic-Hierarchy.org. (for Chronology of Bishops) ^{[self-published]}
- Cheney, David M. "Constantinople (Titular See)". Catholic-Hierarchy.org. (for Chronology of Bishops) ^{[self-published]}
- Chow, Gabriel. "Titular Patriarchal See of Constantinople (Turkey)". GCatholic.org. (for Chronology of Bishops) ^{[self-published]}
- Cheney, David M. "Archdiocese of Bari-Bitonto". Catholic-Hierarchy.org. (for Chronology of Bishops) ^{[self-published]}
- Chow, Gabriel. "Metropolitan Archdiocese of Bari–Bitonto (Italy)". GCatholic.org. (for Chronology of Bishops) ^{[self-published]}

Catholic Church titles
Preceded by Decio Caracciolo Rosso	Archdiocese of Bari-Canosa; 1613–1638	Succeeded by Diego Sersale
Preceded by Guido Bentivoglio	Papal nuncio to Flanders; 1615–1617	Succeeded by Lucio Morra
Preceded by Vitaliano Visconti Borromeo	Apostolic Nuncio to Emperor; 1617–1621	Succeeded by Carlo Carafa
Preceded by Bonaventura Secusio	Titular Patriarch of Constantinople; 1618–1638	Succeeded by Francesco Maria Macchiavelli
