= Archdiocese of Bari-Bitonto =

Roman Catholic archdiocese in Italy

Coordinates: 41°07′42″N 16°52′06″E

Archdiocese of Bari-Bitonto Archidioecesis Barensis-Bituntina

Catholic
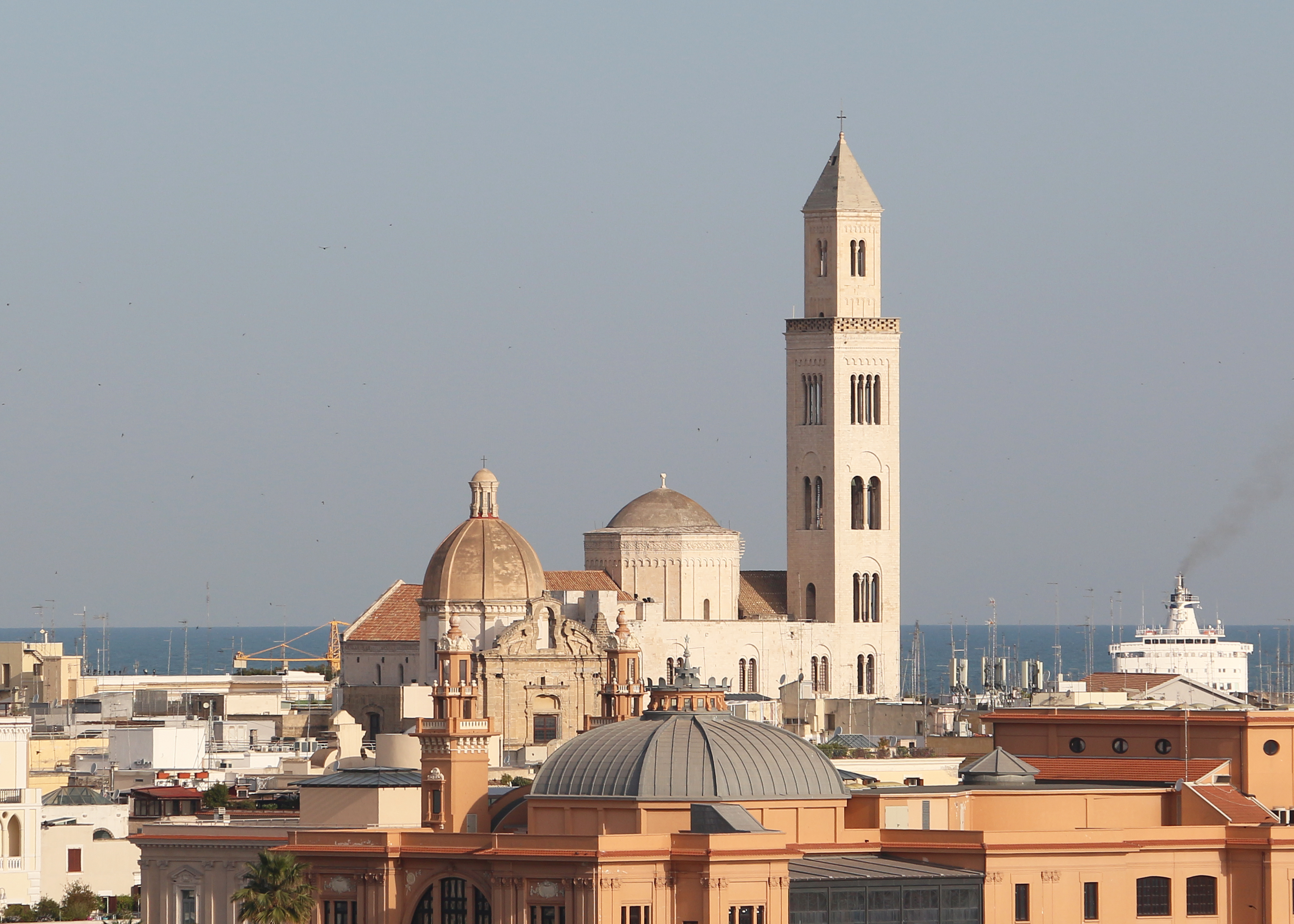
- Basilica-Cattedrale of S. Maria

Location
- Country: Italy
- Ecclesiastical province: Bari-Bitonto

Statistics
- Area: 1,264 km^{2} (488 sq mi)
- Population: Total; Catholics: (as of 2022); 757,830 ▲; 757,506 ▲
- Parishes: 127 ▲

Information
- Denomination: Catholic Church
- Rite: Roman Rite
- Established: 4th Century
- Cathedral: Cattedrale-Basilica di S. Maria
- Co-cathedral: Concattedrale di Maria SS. Assunta
- Secular priests: 174 (diocesan) ▼174 (Religious Orders) ▼71 Permanent Deacons ▼

Current leadership
- Pope: Leo XIV
- Archbishop: Giuseppe Satriano
- Bishops emeritus: Abp. Francesco Cacucci

Map
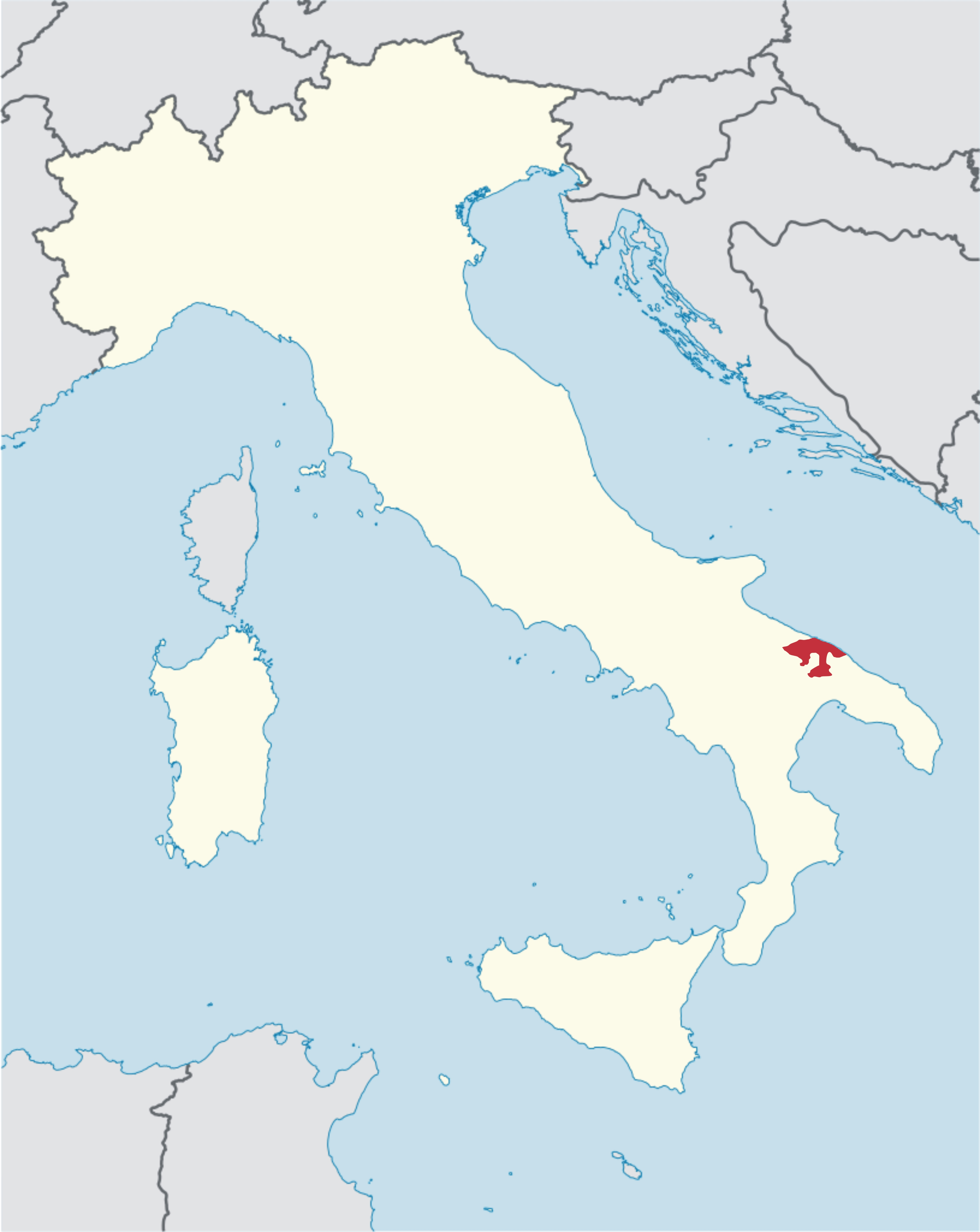

Website
- www.arcidiocesibaribitonto.it

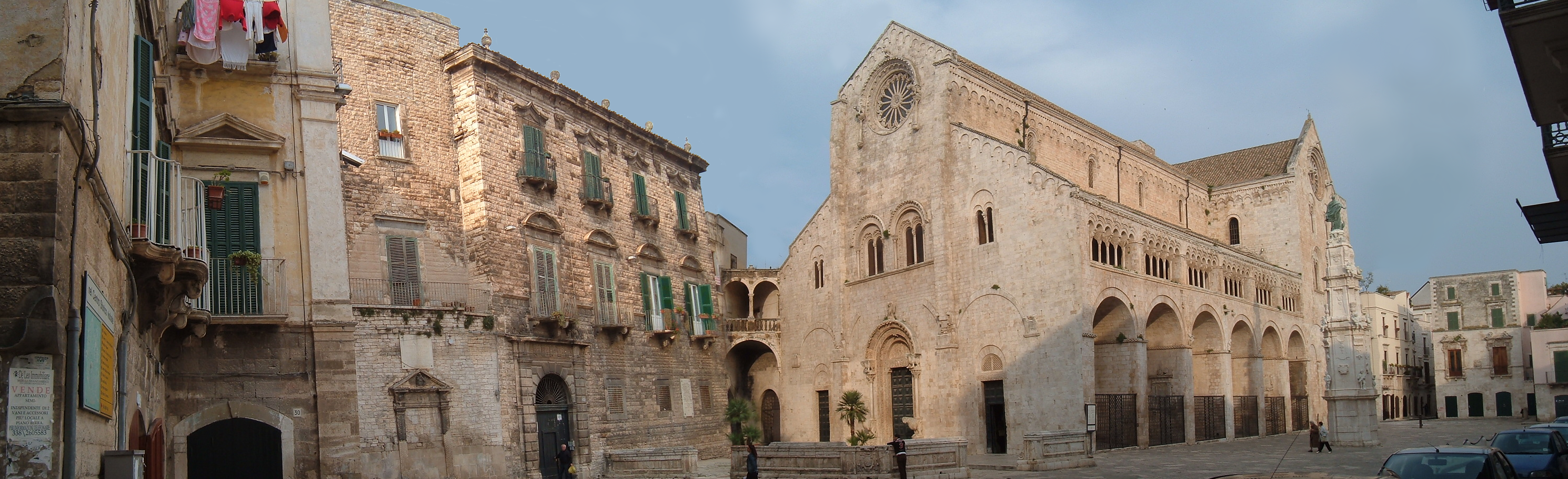
Co-cathedral in Bitonto

The Archdiocese of Bari-Bitonto (Latin: Archidioecesis Barensis-Bituntina) is Metropolitan Latin archdiocese of the Catholic Church in the administrative Bari province, Puglia (Apulia) region, southeastern Italy (the 'Heel'), created in 1986, when the historical diocese of Bitonto was subsumed in the Archdiocese of Bari.

== History ==
=== Early history ===
The first known bishop of Bari was said to have been Gervasius, or Gerontius, who, in 347, was present at the Council of Sardica. Gerontius, however, was actually from the city of Beroea in Macedonia, and there is no record of Gervasius, or of Bari, at the Council of Sardica.

In 530 bishop Peter is said to have held the title of Metropolitan under Epiphanius, bishop of Constantinople & Ecumenical Patriarch, though there is no reliable record of this. In the 6th century the bishops of Apulia were directly subject to the Roman pontiff. It was not until after the Byzantine Patriarchs regained their control of Calabria and Apulia after the decree of Leo I that Bari became an archbishopric, and that situation changed when the Normans invaded Calabria and Apulia in the 11th century and returned the Churches of Calabria and Apulia to the Roman obedience.

=== Middle Ages ===
In 780 bishop Leontius was present at the Second Council of Nicaea.

In the ninth century the Saracens laid waste Apulia, destroyed the city of Canosa (Canusium) and captured Bari. In 841, however, the Byzantine army reconquered Bari, and in 844 Bishop Angelarius, Bishop of Canosa, brought to Bari the relics of Rufinus, Memorus, and Sabinus of Canosa, which he had rescued from the ruins of Canosa. Pope Sergius II conferred on Angelarius the title of Bishop of the two dioceses of Bari and Canosa, a title which the archbishops of Bari retained up to 1986. In 988 the Saracens descended upon Bari, depopulated the countryside and took men and women to Sicily as captives. In 991 Count Atto fought against the Saracens at Taranto, where he and many men of Bari fell. In 1002 Bari was besieged from 2 May until October, when they were rescued by Pietro Orseolo (II), the Doge of Venice.

In 933 Pope John XI granted the bishops of Bari the use of the pallium. It seems that the bishops were dependent on the Eastern Ecumenical Patriarch until the 10th century. Archbishop Giovanni II (952) was able to withdraw from this influence, refusing to accept the prescriptions of the patriarch concerning liturgical points. All connection with the Eastern Churches was finally severed during the eleventh century, as Bari became a direct ecclesiastical dependency of Rome. So before the 10th c was over, the top ranking Orthodox episcopal dignitary throughout Byzantine Italy, became the archbishop of Melfi, in spite of Bari remaining the center of Byzantine authority in the area, as the seat of the katepano of Italia until the capture of the city by the Normans in 1071.

Ironically the archbishop of Bari that irreversibly distanced his see from Byzantium, was Byzantius (1025), who obtained from the pope the privilege of consecrating his suffragans. He also began the construction of the new cathedral, which was continued by his successors, Nicolo (1035), Andreas (1062), and Elias (1089) of the Benedictine Order.

By contrast to Bishop Byzantius' Catholicism affections, Andreas, the archbishop from 1062 to at least 1066, kept an eye to the roots of his Faith, for example journeying to Constantinople, and at some point even converting to Judaism. Archbishop Andreas then fled to Muslim-dominated Egypt, where he eventually died in 1078. Remarkably, the next archbishop Urso (1080–1089) was captured by the Muslim forces and converted to Islam.

In 1087 some sailors from Bari, on their return from the East, brought with them the relics of Saint Nicholas, bishop of Myra. Roger Borsa, the Norman duke of Apulia, built a church, the Basilica of San Nicola to house his remains. This church became the object of pilgrimage. In 1113, the Baresi rejected the rule of Constance, the wife of Bohemond I of Antioch and made the archbishop Riso their leader instead. In return Constance seized the cathedral of Canosa and only by intervention of Pope Paschal II the bishop was allowed back into his own cathedral. Upon reconciliation and bettering relations between Constance and Riso the bishop was killed.

=== Modern Period ===
In the reorganization of the dioceses of the Kingdom of Naples, in accordance with the articles of the Concordat of 1818 between Pope Pius VII and King Ferdinand I of the Two Sicilies, the diocese of Bitetto was suppressed and made a part of the Diocese of Bari. The suffragan sees under Bari historically were: the diocese of Conversano, diocese of Ruvo, and diocese of Bitonto.

In the Apostolic Constitution Qui Beatissimo of 20 October 1980, Pope John Paul II suppressed the ecclesiastical province of Trani, and created the ecclesiastical province of Bari, with the Archbishop of Bari as its Metropolitan. The province of Bari thus included: Bari, Conversano, Ruvo, Bitunto, Trani and Baroli (Barletta), Bisceglie and Andria, Gravina, Melphi, Giovinazzo and Terlizzi, Monopoli, and the prelatures of Altamura and Aquaviva. On 30 September 1986 the independent diocese of Bitunto was suppressed and united with the diocese of Bari, and its bishop, Andrea Mariano Magrassi (1982-1986), who had been Archbishop of Bari-Canosa since 1977, was named Archbishop of the united diocese of Bari-Bitonto.

== Bishops and Archbishops of the diocese ==
=== Bishops of Bari ===
Erected: by 5th Century
Latin Name: Barensis

- Concordius (attested 465)
- ...

=== Archbishops ===
Metropolitan Archbishops of Bari (-Canosa)

Elevated: 6th Century to Metropolitan See
Latin Name: Barensis (-Canusina)

==== to 1300 ====
...

- Joannes
- Alsarius
- Petrus (931–952)
- Joannes (952–978)
- Paulus (978–993)
- Chrysostomos (993–1106)
- Giovanni (1006 – June 1025)
- Byzantius (14 July 1025 – 6 January 1035)
- Nicolaus (1035 – 27 April 1062)
- Andreas (1062 – 1078)
- Urso (June 1078 – 14 February 1089)
- Elias, O.S.B. (1089–1105)
- Risus (1105–1118)
- Gualtieri (by 1120 – 1126)
- Matteo (1126–1129)

...

- Rainaldus (May? 1171 – 4 February 1188)
- Doferius (1 May 1189 – 3 March 1207)
- Berardus de Castanea (1207–1213)
- Andrea de Celano (1214 – 27 Sep 1225 Died)

Sede Vacante (22 September 1225 – 21 December 1226)

- Marino Filangieri (21 December 1226 – 6 July 1251)
- Enrico Filangieri, O.P. (6 May 1252 – 10 October 1258)
- Conradus Teutonicus (7 March 1253 – 5 November 1254)
- Giovanni Saraceno, O.Min. (1259 – 19 August 1280)
- Romuald Grisone (20 June 1282 – 3 February 1309)

==== 1300 to 1700 ====
- Landolfo (24 November 1310 – 4 October 1336)
- Rogerius de Sanseverino (24 March 1337 – 23 May 1347)
- Bartholomaeus Carafa (23 May 1347 – 16 March 1367)
- Niccolò Brancaccio (12 Apr 1367 – 13 Jan 1377)
- Bartolomeo Prignano (1377 – 8 Apr 1378)
- Landolfo Maramaldo (1378 – 1384 Deposed)
- Giacomo Carafa (1384 – died between 1 May and 11 August 1400) (Roman Obedience)
- Nicolaus Accrozamura (5 November 1387 – 1390) (Avignon Obedience)
- Gulielmus (29 July 1387 – 1390) (Avignon Obedience)
- Robertus de Sanseverino (2 July 1390 – ) (Avignon Obedience)
- Nicolaus Paganus (11 August 1400 – 1 December 1424) (Roman Obedience)
- Francesco de Aiello (1424 – 1453 Died)
- Guido Guidano, O.F.M. (1453 – 1454 Died)
- Cardinal Latino Orsini (4 December 1454 – 1472) (Administrator)
- Antonio de Agello (6 November 1472 – 1493)
- Giovanni Giacomo Castiglione (1493 – 1513 Died)
- Esteban Gabriel Merino (9 May 1513 – 2 Sep 1530)
- Girolamo Grimaldi (2 Sep 1530 – 20 Aug 1540 Resigned)
- Gerolamo Sauli (20 Aug 1540 – 18 Apr 1550)
- Giacomo Puteo (18 Apr 1550 – 16 Dec 1562 Resigned)
- Antonio Puteo (del Pozzo) (16 Dec 1562 – 14 Jul 1592 Died)
- Giulio Cesare Riccardi (30 Oct 1592 – 13 Feb 1602 Died)
- Bonviso Bonvisi (18 Mar 1602 – 1 Sep 1603 Died)
- Galeazzo Sanvitale (15 Mar 1604 – 1606 Resigned)
- Decio Caracciolo Rosso (3 Jul 1606 – 27 May 1613 Died)
- Ascanio Gesualdo (1 Jul 1613 – 27 Jan 1638 Died)
- Diego Sersale (20 Dec 1638 – 14 Jul 1665 Died)
- Giovanni Granafei (11 Oct 1666 – 18 Mar 1683 Died)
- Tommaso Maria Ruffo, O.P. (10 Apr 1684 – 30 Apr 1691 Died)
- Carlo Loffredo, C.R. (26 Nov 1691 – 10 Mar 1698 Appointed, Archbishop of Capua)

==== 1700 to 1999 ====
- Muzio Gaeta (Sr.) (7 Apr 1698 – 7 Mar 1728 Died)
- Mihály Karl von Althan (20 Sep 1728 – 2 Dec 1735)
- Muzio Gaeta (Jr.) (19 Dec 1735 – 16 Sep 1754)
- Luigi d’Alessandro (16 Sep 1754 – 28 Jan 1770 Died)
- Adelmo Gennaro Pignatelli di Belmonte, O.S.B. (28 May 1770 – 15 Dec 1777)
- Giambattista Ettore Caracciolo, C.R. (1 Jun 1778 – 22 May 1780 Died)
- Gennaro Maria Guevara Suardo, O.S.B. (27 Feb 1792 Confirmed – 29 Oct 1804)
- Baldassare Mormile, C.R. (26 June 1805 Confirmed – 6 April 1818)
- Nicola Coppola, C.O. (25 May 1818 Confirmed – 17 Nov 1823)
- Michele Basilio Clari (Clary), O.S.B.I. (17 Nov 1823 Confirmed – 15 Feb 1858 Died)
- Francesco Pedicini (27 Sep 1858 – 6 June 1886 Died)
- Enrico (Ernesto) Mazzella (14 Mar 1887 – 14 Oct 1897 Died)
- Giulio Vaccaro (24 March 1898 – 10 March 1924 Died)
- Pietro Pomares y Morant (16 Oct 1924 – 14 Dec 1924 Died)
- Augusto Curi (5 May 1925 – 28 March 1933 Died)
- Marcello Mimmi (31 July 1933 – 30 August 1952)
- Enrico Nicodemo (11 Nov 1952 – 27 Aug 1973 Died)
- Anastasio Alberto Ballestrero, O.C.D. (21 Dec 1973 – 1 Aug 1977)
- Andrea Mariano Magrassi, O.S.B. (24 Nov 1977 – 3 Jul 1999 Resigned)

==== Metropolitan Archbishops of Bari-Bitonto ====
On 30 September 1986, united with the Diocese of Bitonto to form the Archdiocese of Bari-Bitonto

- Francesco Cacucci (3 July 1999 – 29 October 2020 Retired)
- Giuseppe Satriano (29 October 2020 - )

== See also ==
- List of Catholic dioceses in Italy
- Timeline of Bari
