= Bari Cathedral =

Cathedral in Bari, Apulia, Italy

- Cathedral of Saint Sabinus
- Duomo di Bari; Cattedrale di San Sabino
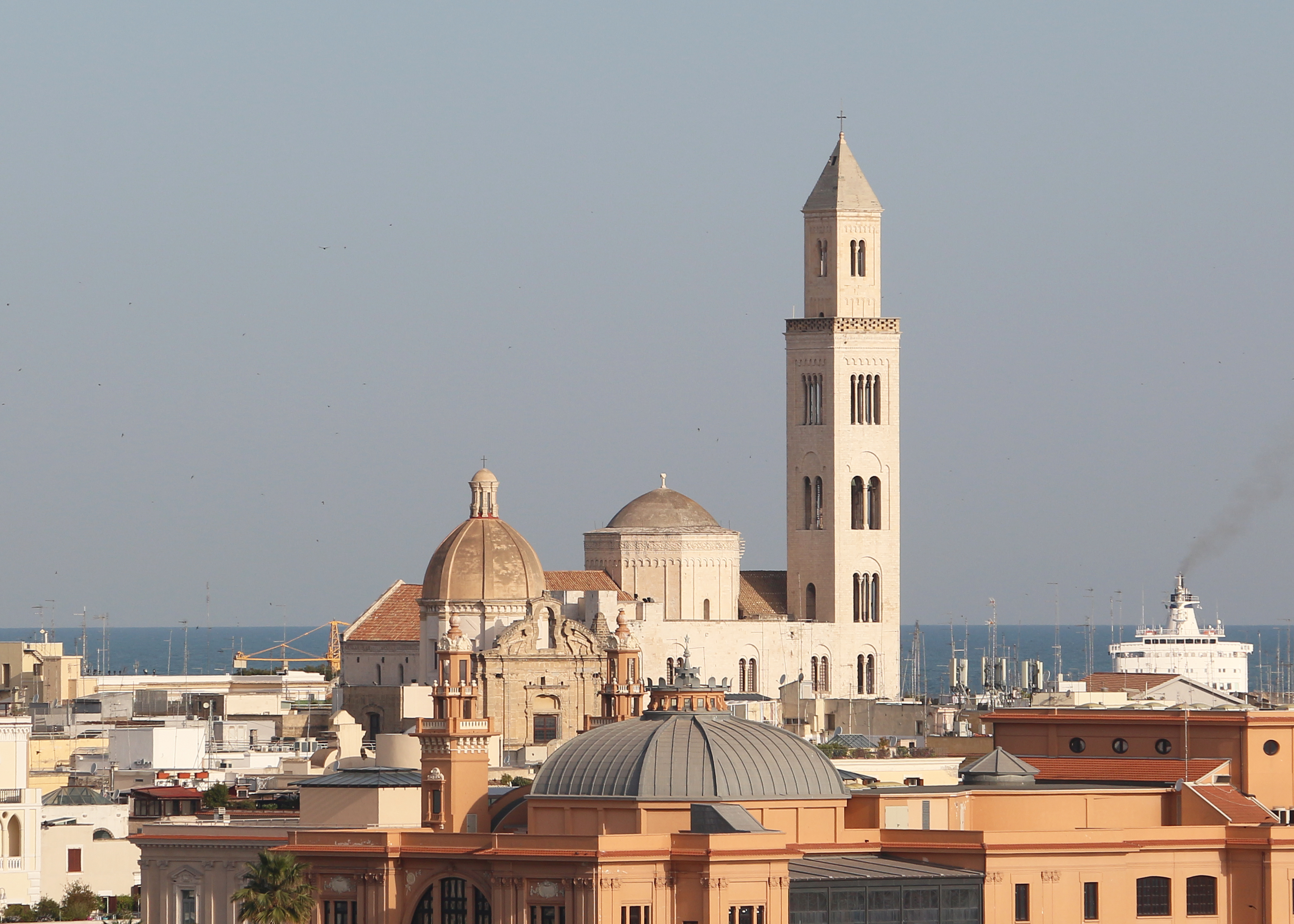
- Remote view
- Bari Cathedral
- 41.128532°N 16.868943°E
- Location: Bari
- Country: Italy
- Denomination: Roman Catholic
- Tradition: Roman

History
- Status: Cathedral
- Consecrated: 1292

Architecture
- Architectural type: Church
- Style: Romanesque
- Completed: 1292

Administration
- Archdiocese: Bari-Bitonto

Clergy
- Archbishop: Giuseppe Satriano

Bari Cathedral (Italian: Duomo di Bari), or Cathedral of Saint Sabinus (Cattedrale di San Sabino), is the cathedral of Bari, in Apulia, southern Italy. The cathedral is the seat of the Archbishop of Bari-Bitonto, as it was previously of the archbishops, earlier bishops, of Bari. It is dedicated to Saint Sabinus, a bishop of Canosa, whose relics were brought here in the 9th century. It is senior to, though less famous than, Apulia's Basilica of St Nicholas.

The present building was constructed between the late 12th and late 13th centuries, mostly in the last thirty years of the 12th century, and was built on the site of the ruins of the Imperial Byzantine cathedral destroyed in 1156 by William I of Sicily known as the Wicked (il Malo); to the right of the transept it is still possible to observe traces of the original pavement which extends under the nave.

== History ==
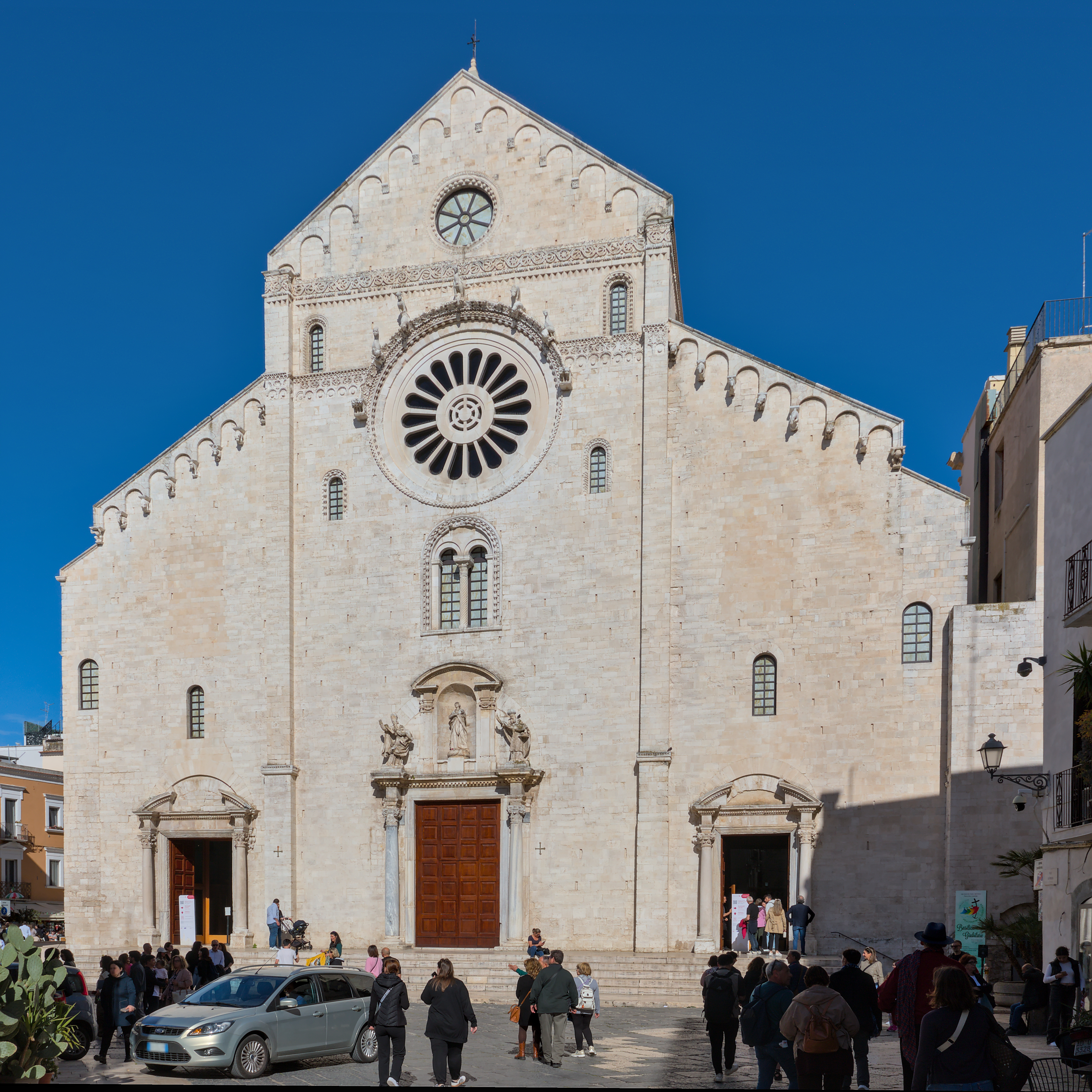
Façade of the Cathedral

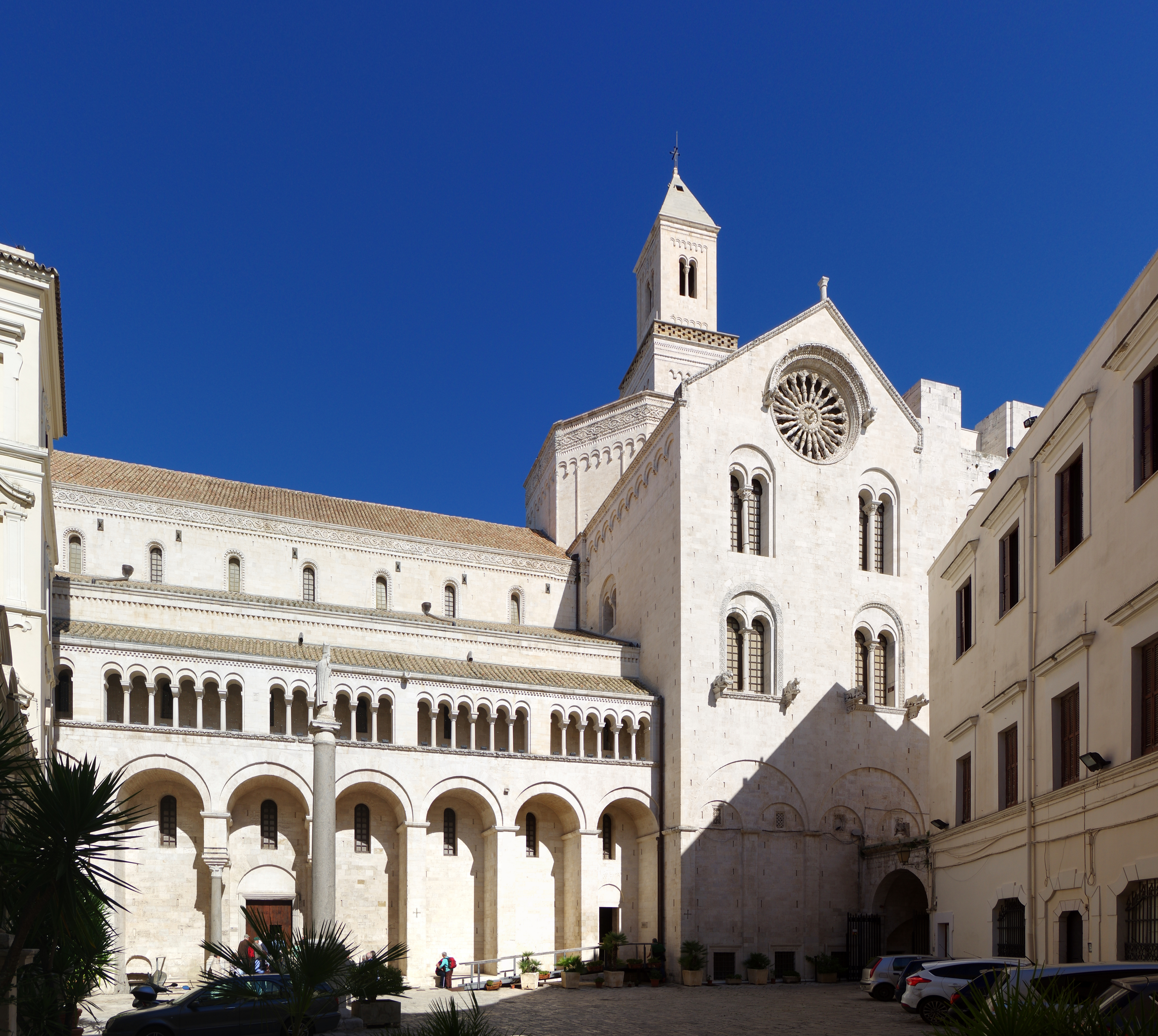
Cathedral exterior

The documented presence of a bishop in Bari goes back to Gervasius, who attended the Council of Sardica in 347, and his successor Concordius, who was present at the Synod of Rome of 465, although names of their predecessors are preserved by tradition, beginning with Saint Maurus in the 1st century. The bishop was elevated to an archbishop in the 6th century, and the presence of a cathedral in Bari is ascertainable from the same period. Under the present nave are traces of an ancient church building with an apse, from the period before the first millennium, which had three aisles and square pilasters, and foundations on an axis slightly out of alignment with that of the present cathedral. One of the mosaic pavements bears an inscription with the name of Bishop Andrea (758 - 761) and it seems highly likely that these are the remains of the first cathedral, which was destroyed in the 9th or 10th century.

In the first half of the 11th century, the then archbishop (1025–1035) ordered the construction of a new episcopal church, which was finished under his successors Nicola I (1035–1061) and Andrea II (1061–1068). This church was then destroyed by William the Wicked (William I of Sicily) along with the rest of the city (only the Basilica of St. Nicholas was spared), which took place in 1156. At the end of the 12th century Archbishop Rainaldo began the reconstruction of the cathedral, reusing materials from the preceding church and other destroyed buildings. Consecrated on 4 October 1292, the new cathedral was built in the style of the Basilica of St. Nicholas, which had served as the episcopal seat in the interim.

During the 18th century the façade, the nave and aisles, the Trulla (the ancient baptistry of the 12th century, today the sacristy) and the crypt were refurbished in Baroque style under Archbishop Muzio Gaeta according to designs by Domenico Antonio Vaccaro. The building later underwent a series of refurbishments, demolitions and extensions. The original Romanesque appearance of the interior was restored in the 1950s. The last two restorations were those of, firstly, the late 20th century, which has restored the clarity of the Romanesque structures, and secondly, the 21st century, which has refurbished the interior.

== Description ==
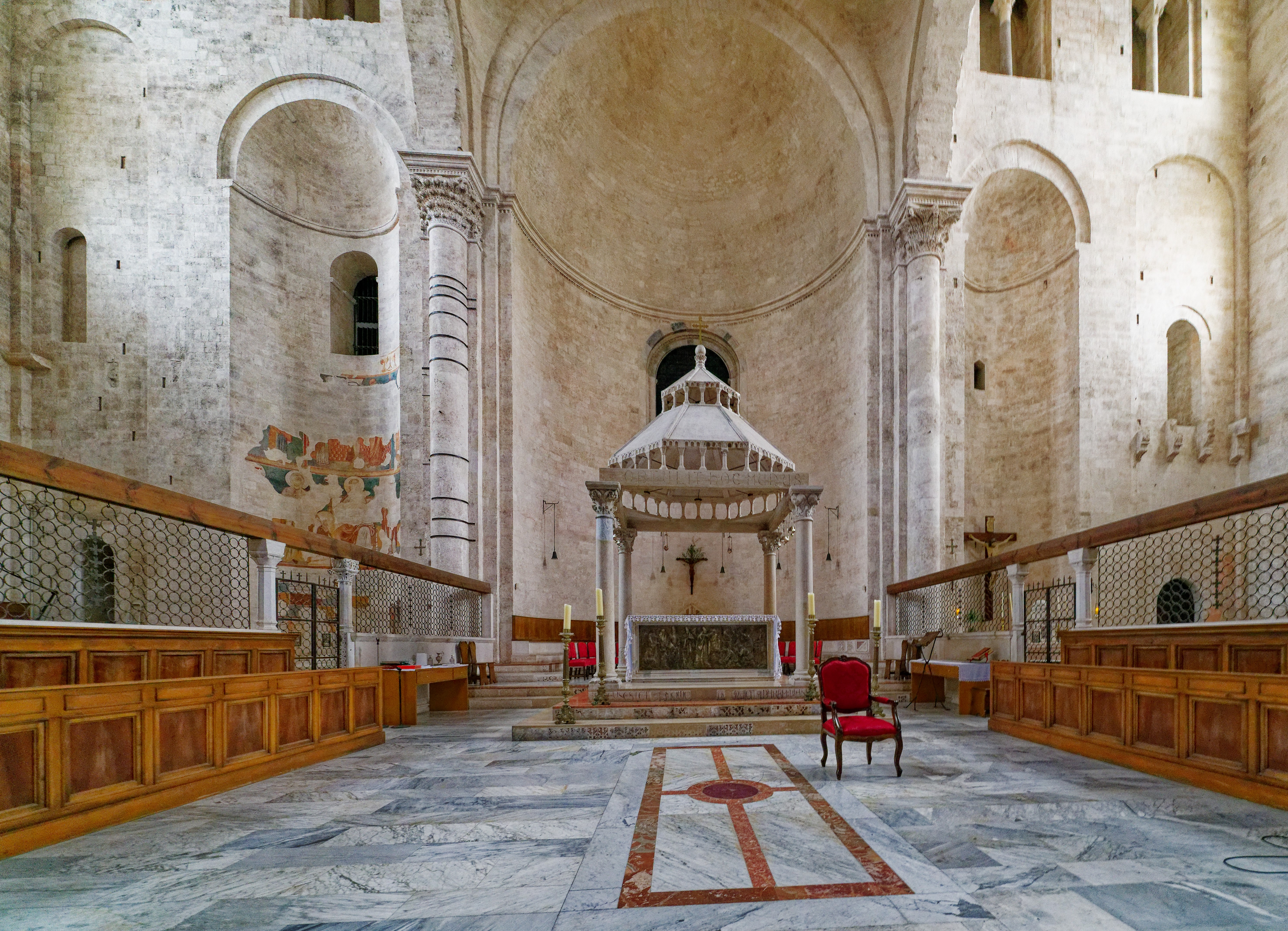
Cathedral interior

Stylistically, this is an important example of Apulian Romanesque. The simple façade has three portals of the 11th century below a rose window, over which is a lintel carved with monsters and fantastic beasts. The campanile is new, rebuilt from stone similar to that of the original, with an elaborate lantern tower and beneath, the dome of the cupola with clear Moorish motifs.

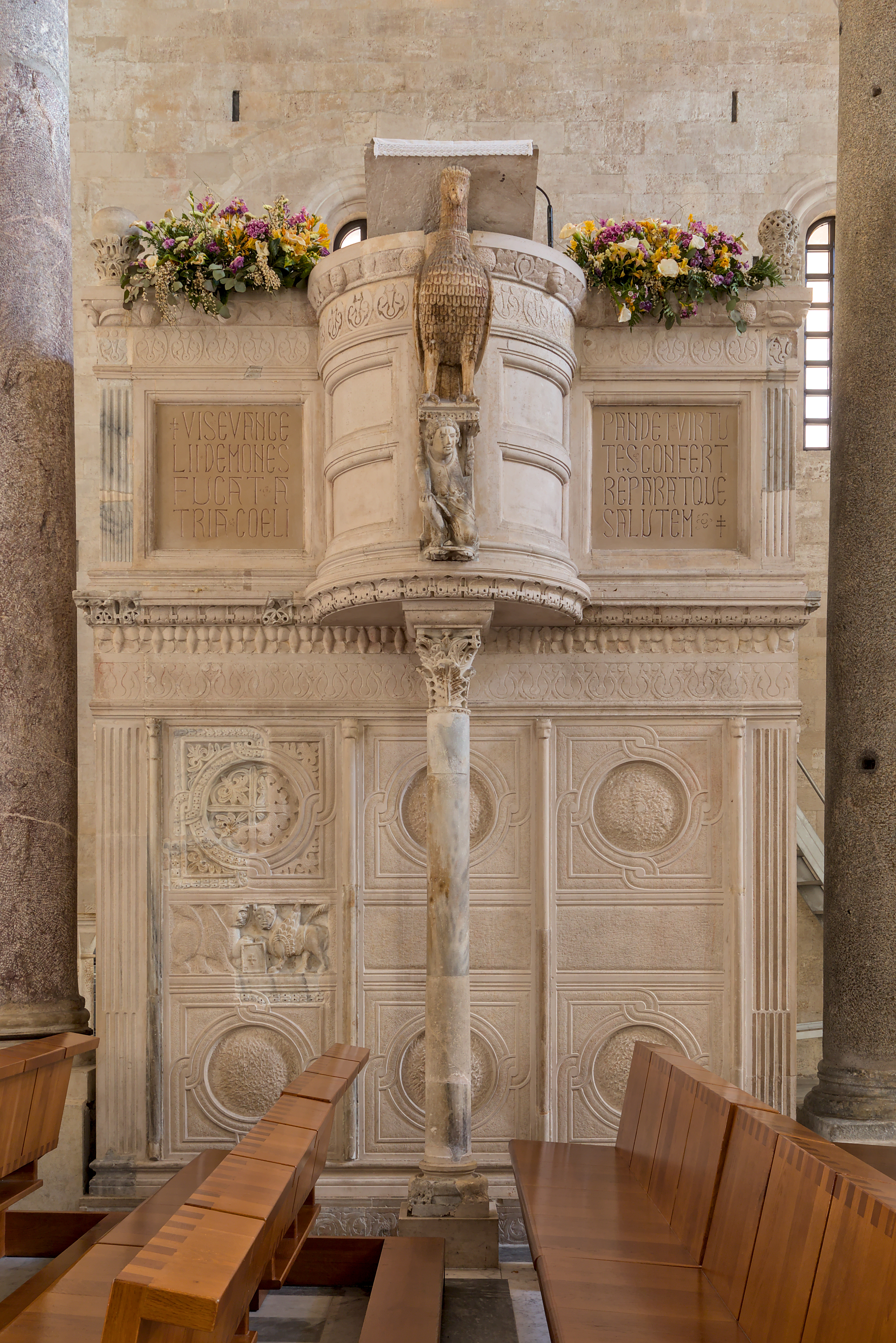
The pulpit

Internally the cathedral is divided into three aisles of sixteen columns with arcades. The church, which had been overwhelmed by Baroque additions, has now been restored to the uncluttered beauty of the original Apulian Romanesque in the transept, in the false matroneum, and in the magnificent pulpit rebuilt from the same material as before.

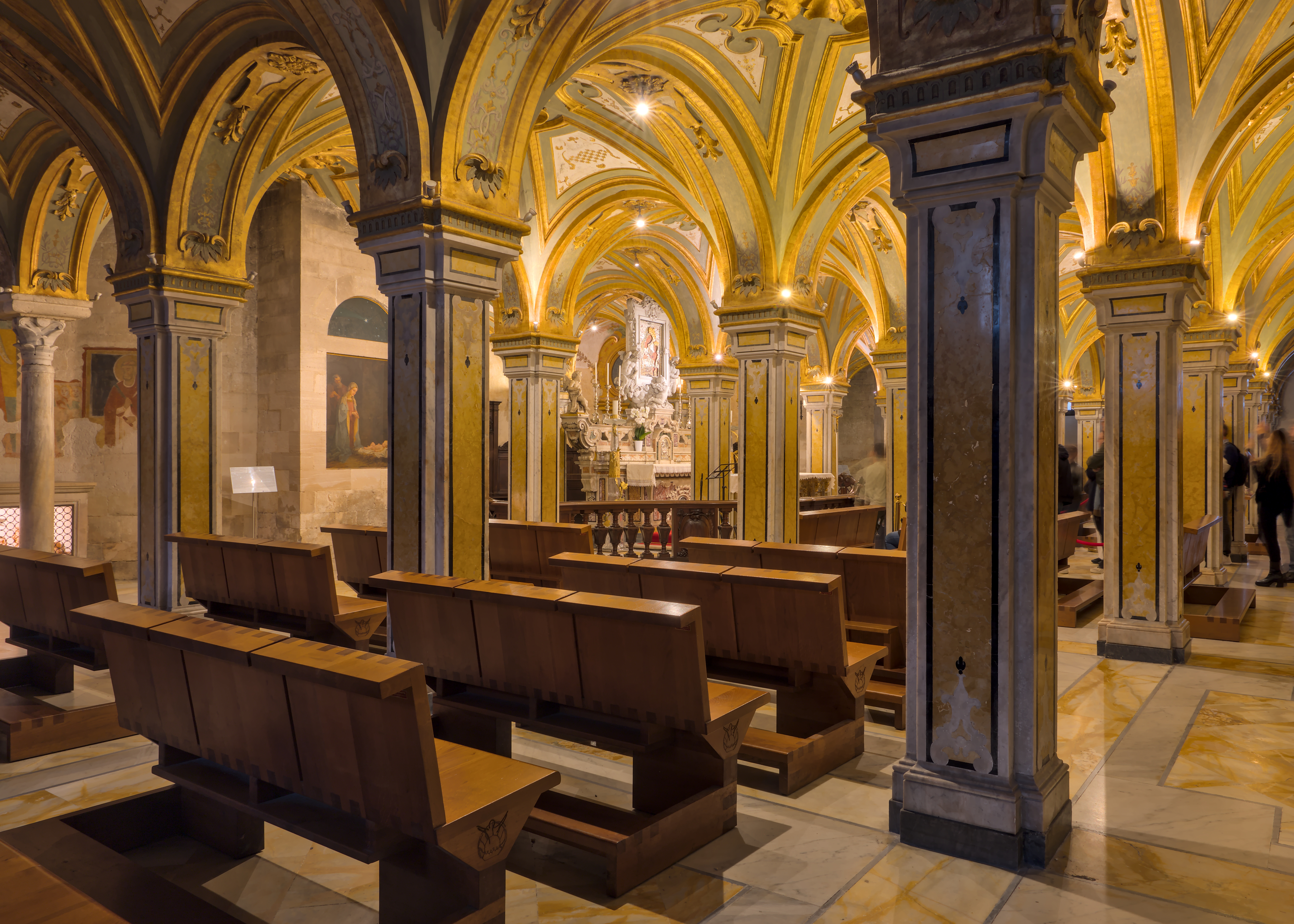
The crypt

In the crypt are preserved the relics of Saint Sabinus, bishop of Canosa, in the larger altar. These were brought to Bari in 844 by Saint Angelarius, bishop of Canosa, who after the destruction of the city by the Saracens, rescued them from the ruins. The silver bust of Saint Sabinus that used to be here was transferred to the capitular archive, and now the icon of the Madonna Odegitria is venerated here: according to tradition this was brought from the Orient in the 8th century, but in reality it is later, although nevertheless a cult object of great antiquity.

In the smaller apses are two sarcophagi: one contains the relics of Saint Columba, which has been restored, and various relics are kept in the other. In the sacristy to the right is located an altar with a painting which probably depicts Saint Maurus, named by tradition as the first bishop of Bari, in the 1st century.

In the palace of the Curia, adjacent to the cathedral, is situated the Diocesan Museum, where the Exultet is displayed. This is a precious manuscript of Byzantine origin, finely illuminated. The images are upside down from the point of view of the priest reading the manuscript. In this way the faithful, when the celebrant was pronouncing the hymn of praise during the Easter Vigil, were able to look at the sacred drawings, and those who were unable to understand Latin could still have some idea of what was going on.
