= Biblioteca Comunale Sperelliana =

Coordinates: 43.3488°N 12.5813°E

The Biblioteca Comunale Sperelliana (est. 1666) is the main public library, since 2010 housed in the former convent of San Pietro located on Via di Fonte Avellana #8, in Gubbio, province of Perugia, Italy.

This library originated on 10 June 1666 with the donation to the city by the bishop of Gubbio, Alessandro Sperelli of his collection of over 7000 volumes. He also provided funds for its maintenance and cataloguing. It was initially housed in the Palazzo Pretorio, Gubbio. The collection grew with the addition of other endowments, including the archival collections of Vincenzo Armanni, the book collections of abott Luigi Ranghiasci, Bonfatti, Mantovani, and of Pietro and Oderigi Lucarelli. Additional books derived from the 19th-century suppression of religious institutions. In 1974, the collection was moved to the former convent of Santo Spirito in via Cairoli. In 2010, it was moved to its present location in the former Olivetan monastery of San Pietro.

Among the treasures of the collection are two 16th-century globes, both of the world and the sky, completed by Matthäus Greuter (1556 - 1638).
