= Ascension of Christ (Perugino, Lyon) =

Painting by Pietro Perugino

Acension of Christ
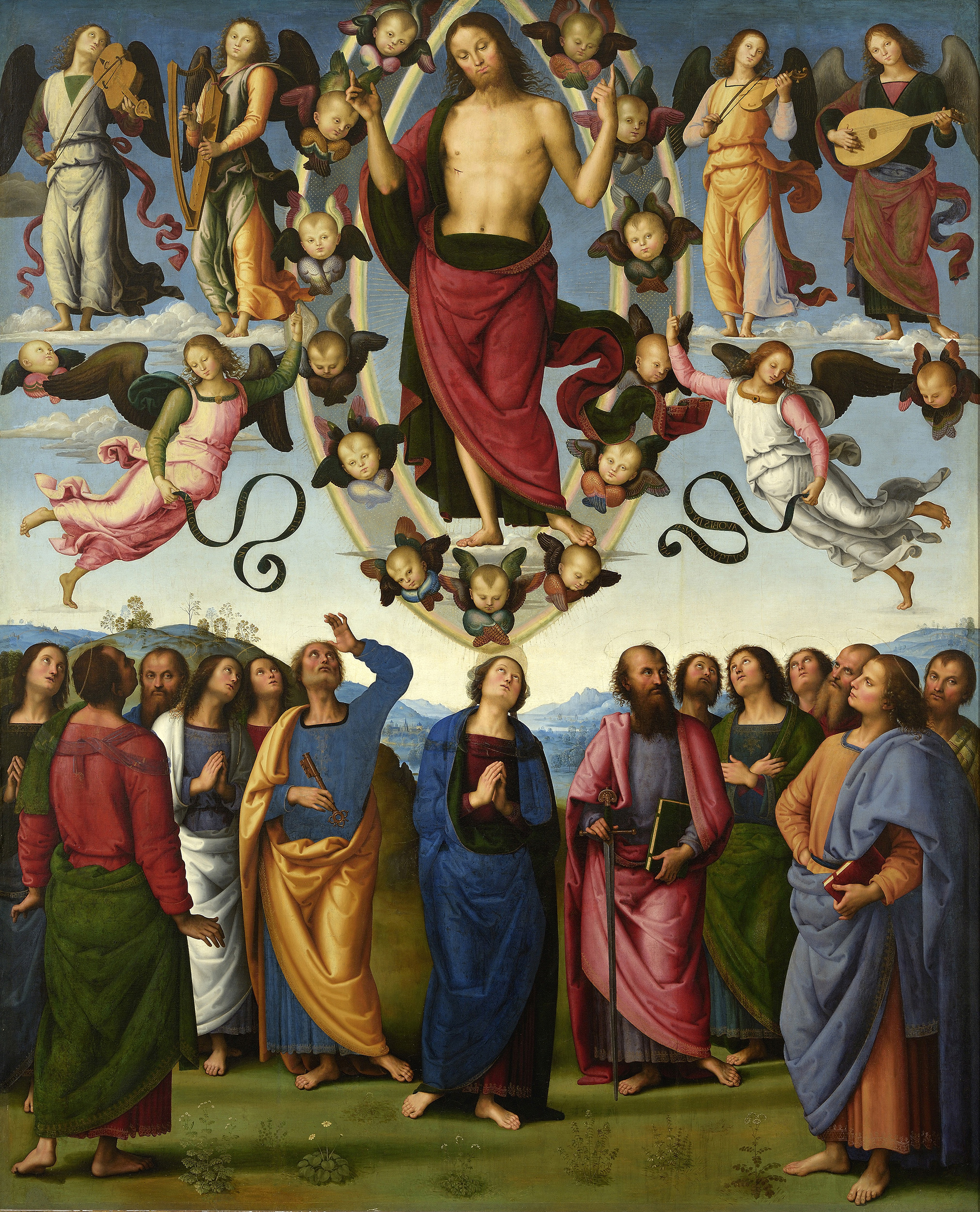
- Artist: Pietro Perugino
- Year: 1496 - 1499
- Type: oil painting
- Dimensions: 325 cm × 265 cm (128 in × 104 in)
- Location: Musée des Beaux-Arts; Lyon

Ascension of Christ is a c. 1496–1499 oil painting by Pietro Perugino, now in the musée des Beaux-Arts de Lyon. It was the prototype for his Sansepolcro Altarpiece. it has dimensions of 325 centimeters in height and 265 in width.
