= Alessandro Borghi (bishop) =

Most Reverend Alessandro Borghi
- Bishop of Sansepolcro
- Church: Catholic Church
- Diocese: Diocese of Sansepolcro
- In office: 1598–1605
- Predecessor: Niccolò Tornabuoni
- Successor: Girolamo Incontri

Personal details
- Born: 1559 Modigliana, Italy
- Died: 9 August 1613 (age 54) Sansepolcro, Italy

Alessandro Borghi (1559 – 9 August 1613) was a Roman Catholic prelate who served as Bishop of Sansepolcro (1598–1605).

== Biography ==
Alessandro Borghi was born in Modigliana, Italy in 1559. On 22 June 1598, he was appointed during the papacy of Pope Clement VIII as Bishop of Sansepolcro. He served as Bishop of Sansepolcro until his resignation in December 1605. He died on 9 August 1613.

== Episcopal succession ==
Episcopal succession of Alessandro Borghi

While bishop, he was the principal co-consecrator of:

- Guido Bentivoglio d'Aragona, Titular Archbishop of Colossae (1607);
- Ulpiano Volpi, Archbishop of Chieti (1609);
- Francesco Mottini, Bishop of Brugnato (1609);
- Antonio Cesonio, Bishop of Oppido Mamertina (1609);
- Benedetto Ala, Archbishop of Urbino (1610);
- Luca Semproni, Bishop of Città di Castello (1610);
- Rodolfo Paleotti, Bishop of Imola (1611);
- Francesco Piccolomini (bishop), Bishop of Grosseto (1611);
- Guillaume d'Hugues, Archbishop of Embrun (1612); and
- Denis-Simon de Marquemont, Archbishop of Lyon (1612).

Catholic Church titles
Preceded by Niccolò Tornabuoni	Bishop of Sansepolcro; 1598–1605	Succeeded by Girolamo Incontri
