= Vallombrosa Altarpiece =

Painting by Pietro Perugino

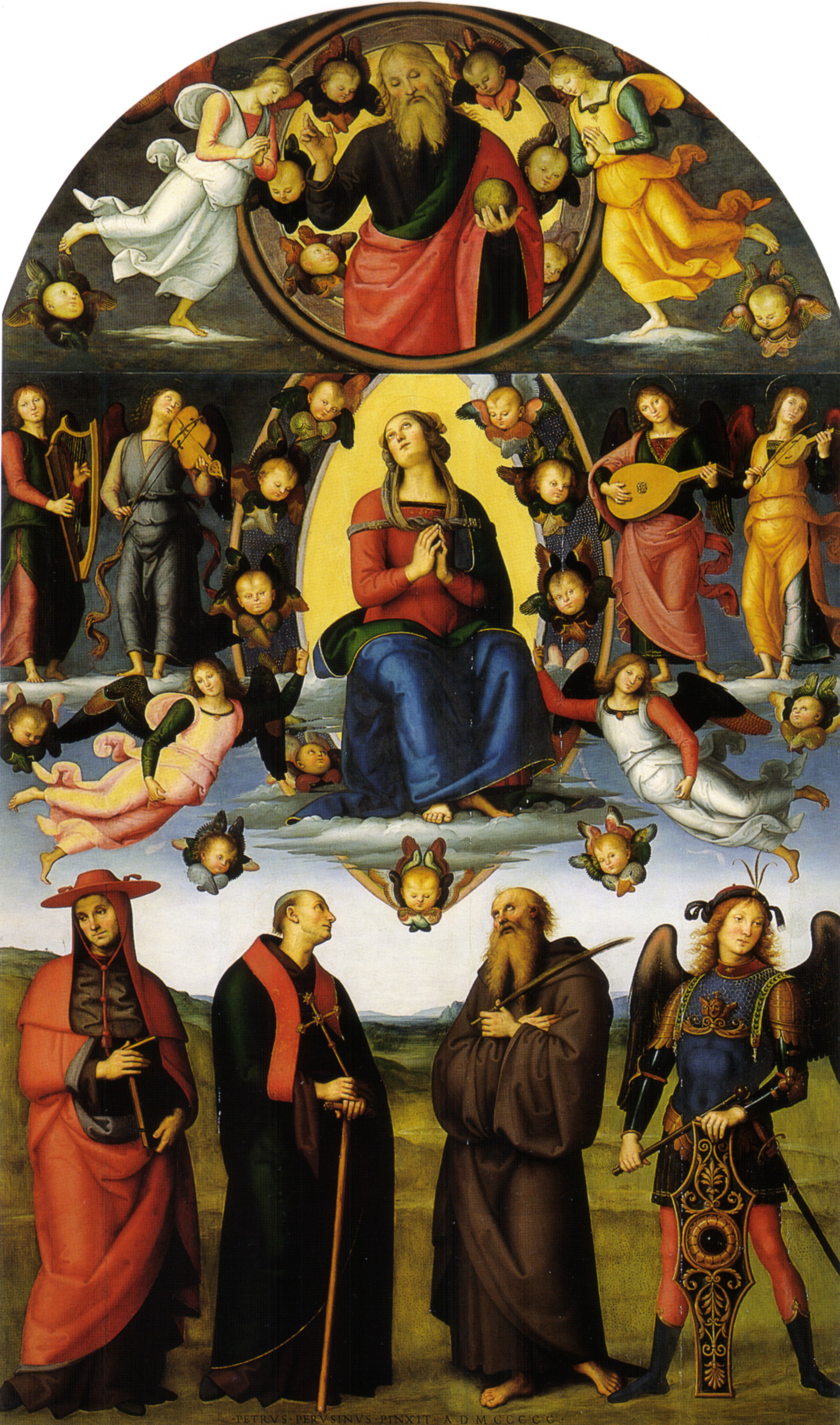
- Artist: Pietro Perugino
- Year: c. 1500
- Medium: Oil on panel
- Dimensions: 415 cm × 246 cm (163 in × 97 in)
- Location: Galleria dell'Accademia, Florence

The Vallombrosa Altarpiece is a painting by the Italian Renaissance painter Pietro Perugino, dating to 1500–01. It is housed in the Accademia Gallery of Florence, Italy.

== History ==
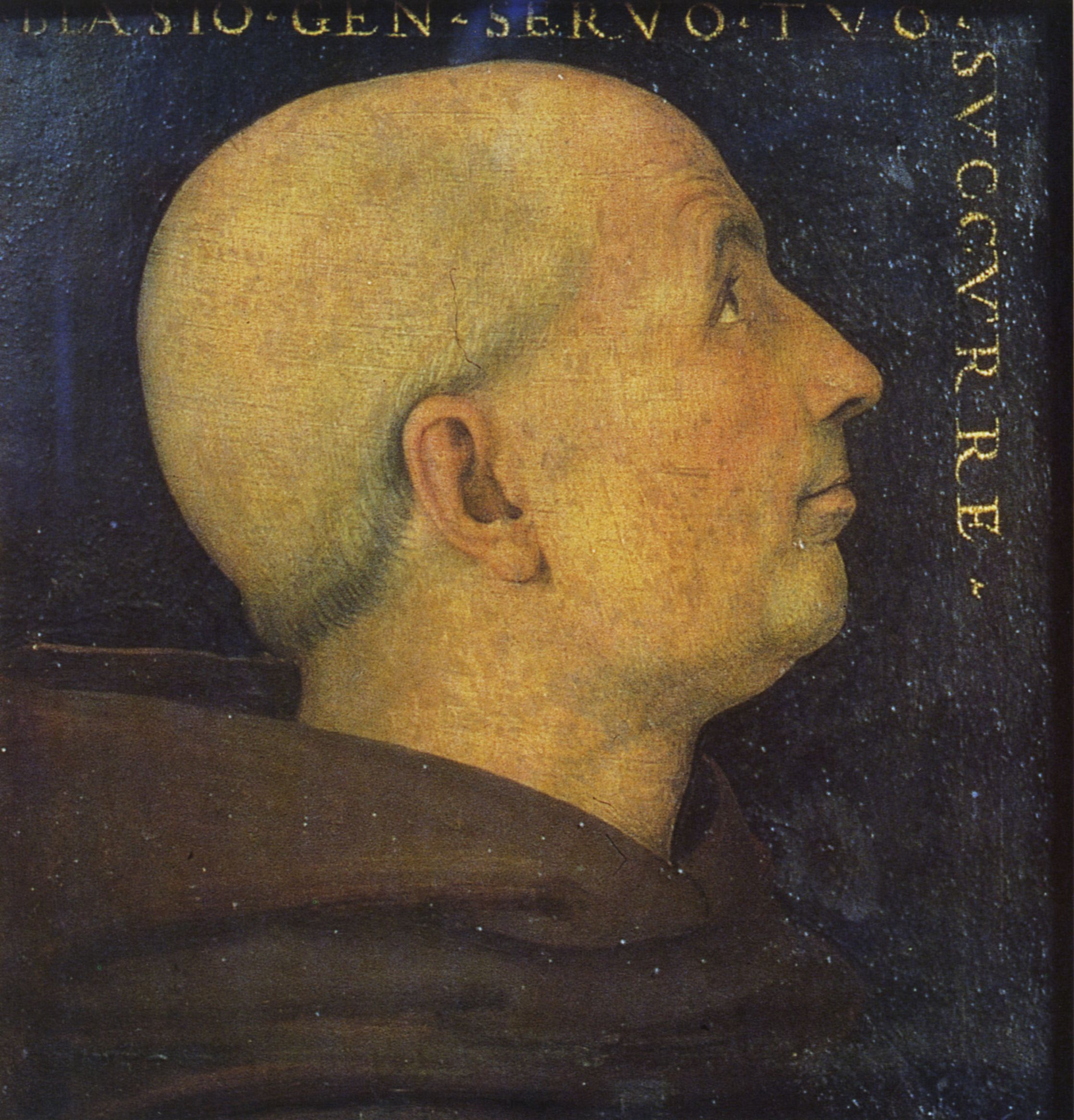
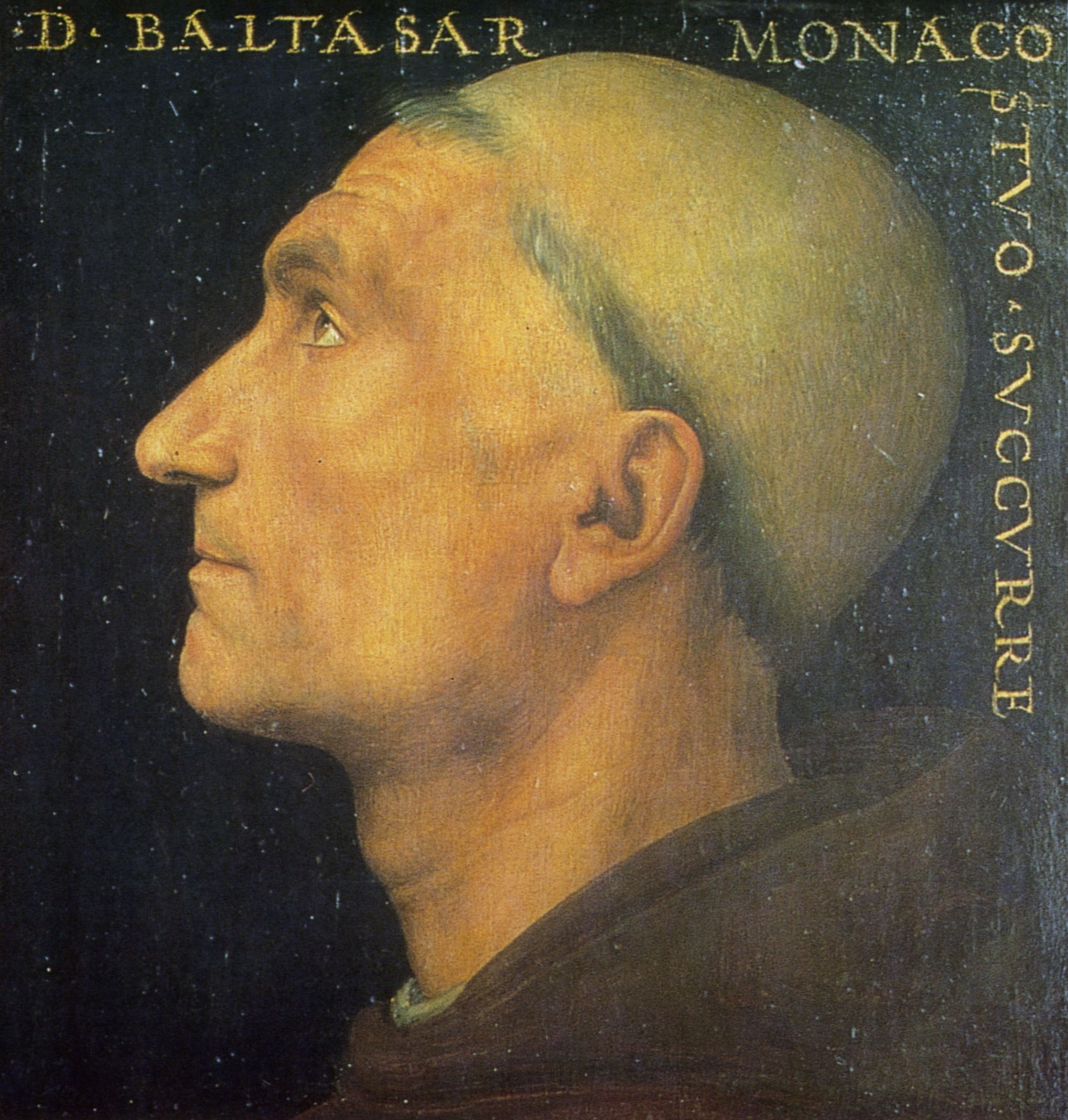
The portraits of Milanesi (left) and Baldassarre (right), the only surviving fragments of the predella.

The painting was commissioned to Perugino in 1497 for the high altar of the Vallombrosa Abbey, by Don Biagio Milanesi, Father General of the Order of the Vallombrosan friars. It was finished in July 1500. Between the beginning of 1495 and the end of 1500, the Perugino workshop was engaged in manufacturing several large works on panel. Art historian G. C. Williamson calls it "one of the finest that Perugino ever produced".

The work was originally completed by a predella, of which only two portraits remain (Biagio Milanesi, the then-abbot, and of the monk Baldassarre); both works are now at the Uffizi Gallery.

After the Napoleonic invasion of Italy and the suppression of the abbey, the canvas was moved to Paris in 1810. However, it was restored to Tuscany in 1817, being assigned to the Florentine gallery in this occasion.

== Description ==
As for other Perugino's works, the panel is divided into two sections, in a pattern derived from his Assumption (now lost) of the Sistine Chapel: the upper part with God and celestial figures, and the lower one, with the saints. In the middle is the ascending Mary, enclosed within an almond which sharply ends at the lunette, in turn occupied by a blessing God surrounded by angels. The figure of God and the framing angels and musicians are reminiscent of Perugino's earlier San Pietro Polyptych, done for the Abbey of San Pietro in Perugia, and whose theme was the Ascension of Christ.

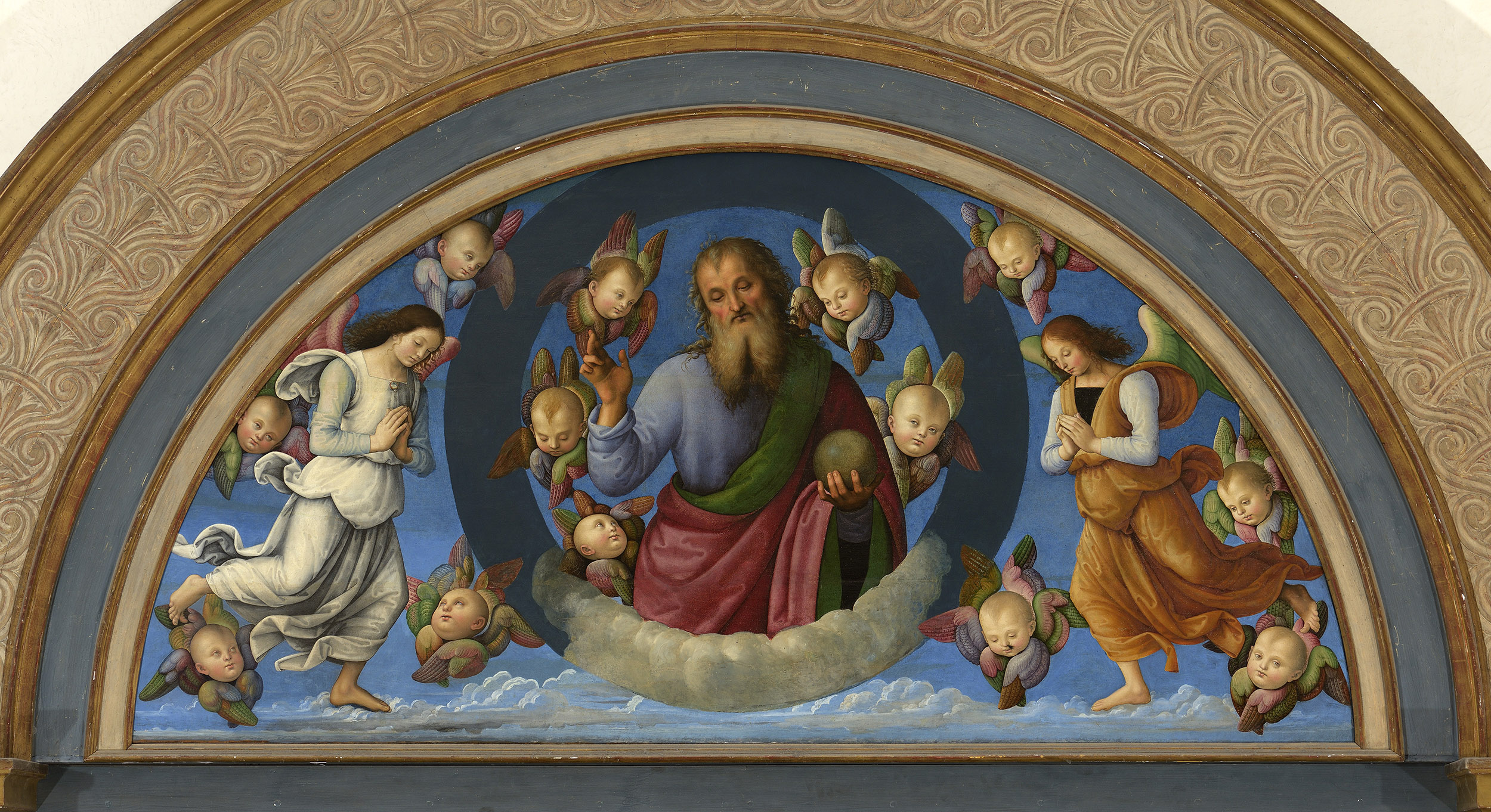
part of the San Pietro Polyptych

Below are four saints, portrayed above an indeterminate hilly landscape: from left, Bernard degli Uberti, John Gualbert, founder of the monastery at Vallombrosa; Benedict and the Archangel Michael. At the lower edge is the artist's signature, reading "PETRVS PERVSINVS PINXIT AD MCCCCC".

Baldassarre di Angelo, pictured in a panel of the predella, was procurator of the Vallombrosa abbey in 1500. He is identifiable thanks to the epigraph along the edges of the painting.

Raphael worked as an assistant to Perugino. His early Baronci Altarpiece for the Church of St. Nicholas of Tolentine in Città di Castello owes much of its compositional format to the Vallombrosa Altarpiece.

== See also ==
- San Pietro Polyptych
- Ascension of Christ (Perugino)

== Sources ==
- Garibaldi, Vittoria (2004). "Perugino". Pittori del Rinascimento. Florence: Scala.
