= Luca Semproni =

17th-century Roman Catholic bishop

Most Reverend Luca Semproni
- Bishop of Città di Castello
- Church: Catholic Church
- Diocese: Diocese of Città di Castello
- In office: 1610–1616
- Predecessor: Valeriano Muti
- Successor: Evangelista Tornioli

Orders
- Consecration: 9 May 1610 by Michelangelo Tonti

Personal details
- Born: Rimini, Italy
- Died: 15 January 1616

Luca Semproni (died 1616) was a Roman Catholic prelate who served as Bishop of Città di Castello (1610–1616).

== Biography ==
Luca Semproni was born in Rimini, Italy. On 26 Apr 1610, Luca Semproni was appointed during the papacy of Pope Paul V as Bishop of Città di Castello. On 9 May 1610, he was consecrated bishop by Michelangelo Tonti, Bishop of Cesena, with Metello Bichi, Bishop Emeritus of Sovana, and Alessandro Borghi, Bishop Emeritus of Sansepolcro, serving as co-consecrators. He served as Bishop of Città di Castello until his death on 15 Jan 1616.

While bishop, he was the principal consecrator of Domenico de' Marini, Bishop of Albenga (1611).

== External links and additional sources ==
- Cheney, David M. "Diocese of Città di Castello". Catholic-Hierarchy.org. (for Chronology of Bishops) ^{[self-published]}
- Chow, Gabriel. "Diocese of Città di Castello". GCatholic.org. (for Chronology of Bishops) ^{[self-published]}

Catholic Church titles
Preceded by Valeriano Muti	Bishop of Città di Castello; 1610–1616	Succeeded by Evangelista Tornioli
