= Beadini =

Beadini is a surname. Notable people with the surname include:

- Buran Beadini (born 1955), Yugoslav footballer and manager
- Naser Beadini (1962–1992), Yugoslav footballer

== See also ==
- Bedini
