= Giovanni dei Gualtieri =

Roman Catholic prelate

Most Reverend Giovanni dei Gualtieri
- Bishop of Sansepolcro
- Church: Catholic Church
- Diocese: Diocese of Sansepolcro
- In office: 1615–1619
- Predecessor: Girolamo Incontri
- Successor: Filippo Salviati

Orders
- Consecration: 6 December 1615 by Giovanni Garzia Mellini

Personal details
- Born: 1565
- Died: 20 May 1619 (age 54) Sansepolcro, Italy

Giovanni dei Gualtieri (1565 – 20 May 1619) was a Roman Catholic prelate who served as Bishop of Sansepolcro (1615–1619).

== Biography ==
Giovanni dei Gualtieri was born in 1565. On 2 December 1615, he was appointed during the papacy of Pope Paul V as Bishop of Sansepolcro. On 6 December 1615, he was consecrated bishop by Metello Bichi, Cardinal-Priest of Sant'Alessio with Marco Cornaro, Bishop of Padova, and Leonardus Roselli, Bishop Emeritus of Vulturara e Montecorvino, serving as co-consecrators. He served as Bishop of Sansepolcro until his death on 20 May 1619.

Catholic Church titles
Preceded by Girolamo Incontri	Bishop of Sansepolcro; 1615–1619	Succeeded by Filippo Salviati
