= Bartolomeo Maraschi =

Most Reverend Bartolomeo Maraschi
- Bishop of Città di Castello
- Church: Catholic Church
- Diocese: Diocese of Città di Castello
- In office: 1474–1487
- Predecessor: Giovanni Gianderoni
- Successor: Giovanni Battista Lagni

Personal details
- Died: 1487 Città di Castello, Italy

Bartolomeo Maraschi (died 1487) was a Roman Catholic prelate who served as Bishop of Città di Castello (1474–1487).

== Biography ==
On 15 July 1474, Bartolomeo Maraschi was appointed by Pope Sixtus IV as Bishop of Città di Castello. As a papal envoy he traveled to Buda for peace negotiations with the emperor. He served as Bishop of Città di Castello until his death in 1487. From 1473 to his death he was also master of the papal chapel.

== External links and additional sources ==
- Cheney, David M. "Diocese of Città di Castello". Catholic-Hierarchy.org. (for Chronology of Bishops) ^{[self-published]}
- Chow, Gabriel. "Diocese of Città di Castello". GCatholic.org. (for Chronology of Bishops) ^{[self-published]}

Catholic Church titles
Preceded by Giovanni Gianderoni	Bishop of Città di Castello; 1474–1487	Succeeded by Giovanni Battista Lagni
