= San Pietro Polyptych =

Polyptych painting by Perugino

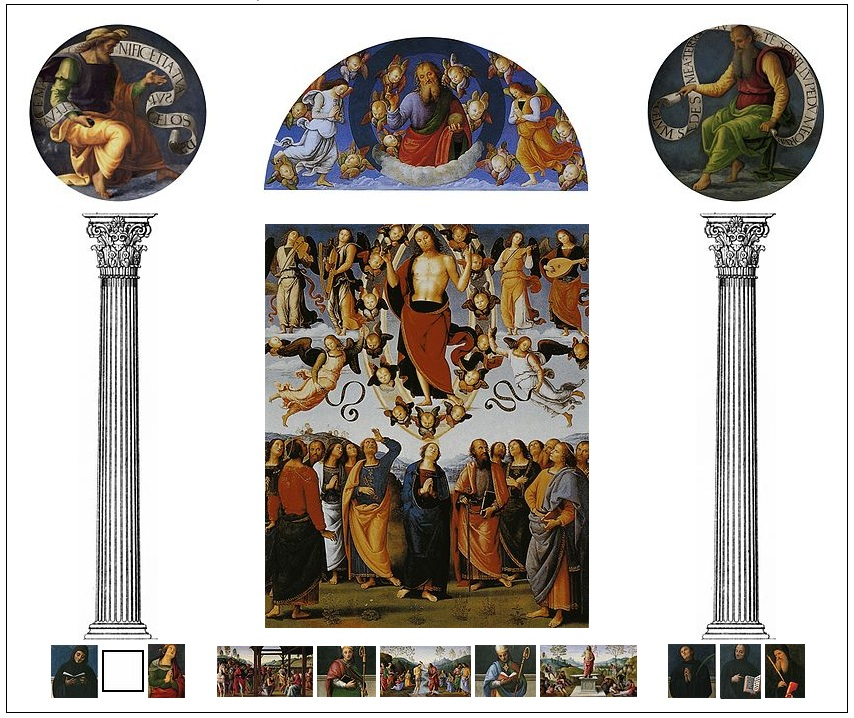
- Artist: Perugino
- Year: c. 1496 – 1500
- Medium: Oil on panel
- Location: Various

The San Pietro Polyptych (Italian: Polittico di San Pietro) is a polyptych by Italian Renaissance master Perugino, painted around 1496–1500. The panels are now in different locations: the lunette and the central panel, depicting the Ascension of Christ, are in the Museum of Fine Arts of Lyon, France.

== Description ==
The polyptych had been originally commissioned for the Abbey of San Pietro at Perugia, the contract having been signed by Perugino on 8 March 1495. It included a large altarpiece and several panels, within a wooden frame by Domenico da Verona. The altarpiece, depicting the Ascension of Christ, was to have a lunette with the God in Glory between Angels above it, while the predella had not been exactly defined. The payment was 500 golden ducats, and no more than two years and a half were given to complete the work.

The panels were painted between January 1496 and the end of 1499, and the work was solemnly inaugurated on 13 January 1500. Contemporary art historian Giorgio Vasari considered the predella Perugino's best work in his home city.

In 1591 the church's choir was radically restored, and the altar had to be dismantled. After the religious suppressions of 1797, the work was acquired by the French, and was divided among several French museums, although several panels remained in Perugia or went to Papal collections in Rome.

== Description ==
The cymatium was separated from the main panel by a frame, in the same way as the Vallombrosa Altarpiece. At the sides were two columns which supported the frame arch and which, at the bases, were decorated with three small panels with Saints, sharing the same background.

The polyptych included the following panels:

- Ascension (280 × 216 cm), now at the Museum of Fine Arts of Lyon. This work was almost entirely copied by Perugino and his workshop for the later Sansepolcro Altarpiece. The Vallombrosa Altarpiece also used a similar composition, in turn inspired by the now lost Assumption in the Sistine Chapel.
- God in Glory lunette (114 × 230 cm), now in the Museum of Fine Arts of Lyon. It represents God in a cloud in the sky, surrounded by cherubim and seraphim, and two symmetrical angels at the side.
- Tondoes of Jeremiah and Isaiah (both 127 cm in diameter), now in the Musée des beaux-arts of Nantes
- Adoration of the Magi (predella panel, 32 × 59 cm). Now in the Musée des Beaux-Arts of Rouen.
- Baptism of Christ (predella panel, 32 × 59 cm). Now in the Musée des Beaux-Arts of Rouen.
- Resurrection (predella panel, 32 × 59 cm). Now in the Musée des Beaux-Arts of Rouen.
- St. Herculanus and St. Constantius (predella panels, 32 × 38 cm). Now in the Galleria Nazionale dell'Umbria at Perugia.
- St. Maurus, St. Peter ad Vincula, St. Scholastica, St. Benedict, St. Flavia and St. Placidus (panels at the columns base, various sizes). Now in the Galleria Nazionale dell'Umbria at Perugia and the Pinacoteca Vaticana in Rome.

== Sources ==
- Musée des Beaux-Arts de Lyon
- Garibaldi, Vittoria (2007). "Perugino". Pittori del Rinascimento. Florence: Scala. ISBN 978-8881170999.
