= Pellegrino Tomaso Ronchi =

Italian bishop

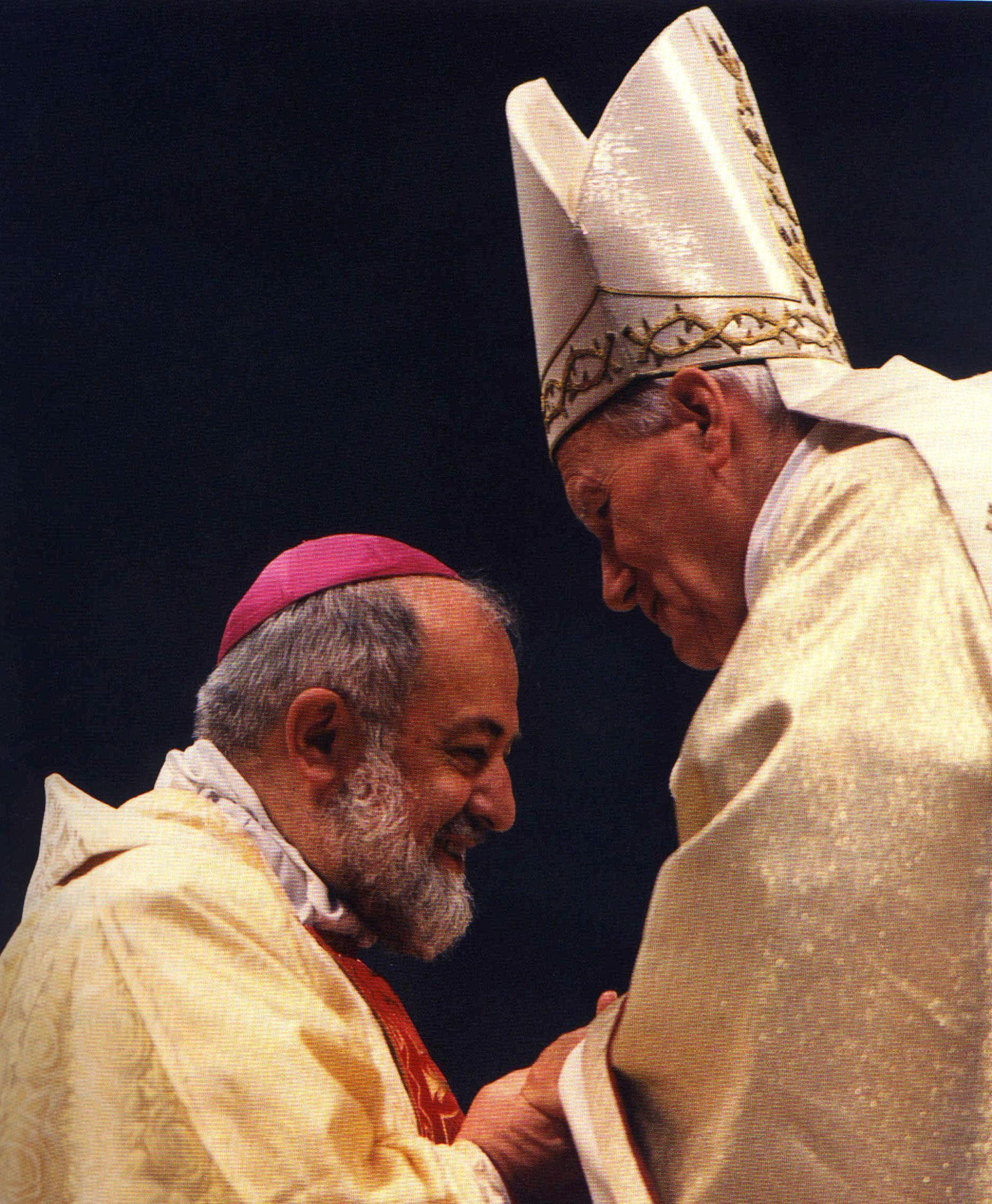
- Pellegrino Tomaso Ronchi and Pope John Paul II
- Church: Roman Catholic Church
- See: Diocese of Città di Castello
- In office: 1991–2007
- Predecessor: Carlo Urru
- Successor: Domenico Cancian
- Previous post: Diocese of Porto-Santa Rufina

Orders
- Ordination: 21 March 1953
- Consecration: 6 January 1985 by Pope John Paul II

Personal details
- Born: 19 January 1930 Riolo Terme, Italy
- Died: 24 October 2018 (aged 88) Perugia, Italy

Pellegrino Tomaso Ronchi (19 January 1930 – 24 October 2018) was an Italian bishop, emeritus of the Diocese of Città di Castello.

== Biography ==
He was ordained a priest on 21 March 1953. He was first appointed bishop of the Diocese of Porto-Santa Rufina on 7 December 1984, receiving his episcopal consecration on 6 January 1985 from Pope John Paul II. He then resigned from this position, due to illness problems, on 9 November 1985. Later, he was appointed bishop of Diocese of Città di Castello on 7 February 1991. Ronchi retired as bishop on 16 June 2007.
