= Carlo Liviero =

Italian Roman Catholic bishop

Blessed Bishop Carlo Liviero
- Bishop of Città di Castello
- Church: Roman Catholic Church
- Diocese: Città di Castello
- See: Città di Castello
- Appointed: 8 January 1910
- Installed: 27 June 1910
- Term ended: 7 July 1932
- Predecessor: Giustino Sanchini
- Successor: Maurizio Francesco Crotti

Orders
- Ordination: 22 December 1888
- Consecration: 6 March 1910 by Luigi Pellizzo
- Rank: Bishop

Personal details
- Born: Carlo Liviero; 29 May 1866 Vicenza, Kingdom of Italy
- Died: 7 July 1932 (aged 66) Fano, Pesaro-Urbino, Italy
- Motto: In caritate Christi ("In the love of Christ")

Sainthood
- Feast day: 7 July
- Venerated in: Roman Catholic Church
- Title as Saint: Blessed
- Beatified: 27 May 2007; Città di Castello, Italy by Cardinal José Saraiva Martins
- Attributes: Bishop's attire
- Patronage: Little Servants of the Sacred Heart

Blessed Carlo Liviero was an Italian Roman Catholic bishop who led the Diocese of Città di Castello. He was beatified in 2007 and his cause for sainthood continues. He established the Little Servants of the Sacred Heart.

== Biography ==
Carlo Liviero was born in 1866 and was ordained to the priesthood in 1888. He ministered in his hometown, then in Città di Castello before Pope Pius X appointed him as the Bishop of Città di Castello. Liviero was appointed after Giustino Sanchini, future bishop of Fano, declined this appointment in 1909. He received episcopal consecration on 6 March 1910 and his formal installation was on 27 June 1910.

Liviero founded a school and libraries in his diocese and also established the La Voce del popolo magazine. After World War I he founded a hospice for war orphans and abandoned children. He also established the Little Servants of the Sacred Heart.

He was involved in a car accident on 24 June 1932 in Fano and died two weeks after in hospital. He was buried in Città di Castello and his remains transferred to the main cathedral.

== Beatification ==
The cause of sainthood of the Servant of God started on 5 August 1976 and commenced on a diocesan level before the Positio - documentation on his life of heroic virtue - was forwarded to the Congregation for the Causes of Saints in 1989. This culminated on 1 July 2000 when Pope John Paul II proclaimed him to be Venerable.

The investigation into the miracle occurred on a diocesan level twice in 2002 and in 2004. Pope Benedict XVI approved the miracle on 16 December 2006 and it led to the beatification mass on 27 May 2007.
