= Diocese of Città di Castello =

Roman Catholic diocese in Italy

Coordinates: 43.4700°N 12.2314°E

Diocese of Città di Castello Dioecesis Civitatis Castelli o Tifernatensis

Catholic
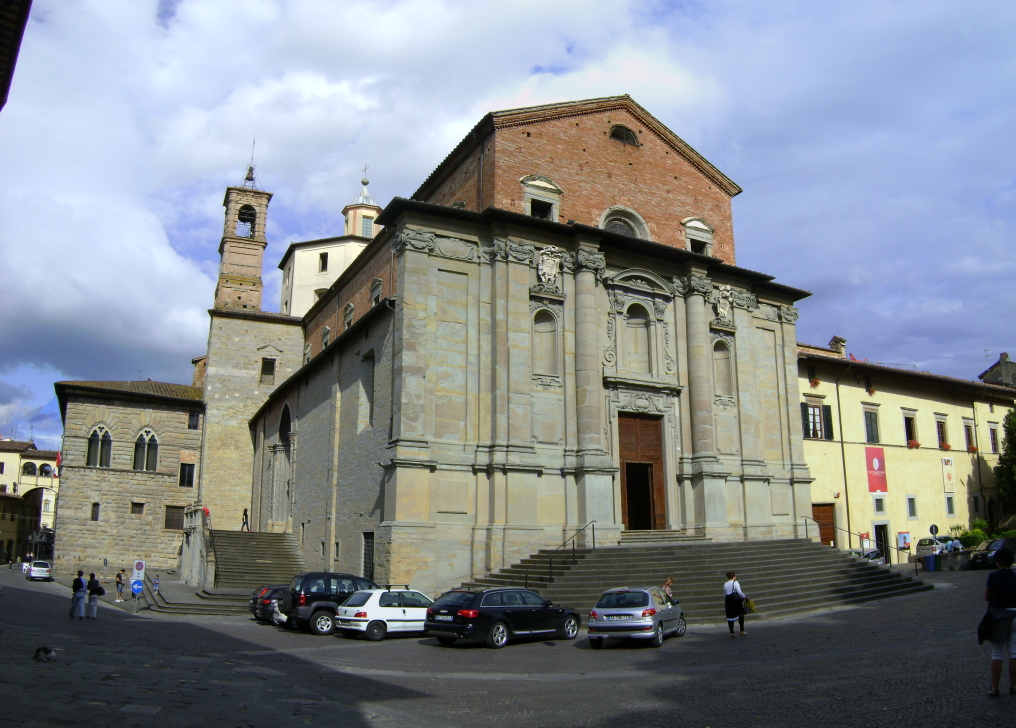
- Città di Castello Cathedral

Location
- Country: Italy
- Ecclesiastical province: Perugia-Città della Pieve

Statistics
- Area: 820 km^{2} (320 sq mi)
- Population: Total; Catholics: (as of 2016); 64,800 (est.); 62,470 (guess)
- Parishes: 60

Information
- Denomination: Catholic Church
- Rite: Roman Rite
- Established: 7th century
- Cathedral: Basilica Cattedrale di Ss. Florido e Amanzio
- Secular priests: 46 (diocesan); 7 (Religious Orders); 19 Permanent Deacons

Current leadership
- Pope: Leo XIV
- Bishop: Luciano Paolucci Bedini
- Bishops emeritus: Domenico Cancian, F.A.M.

Map
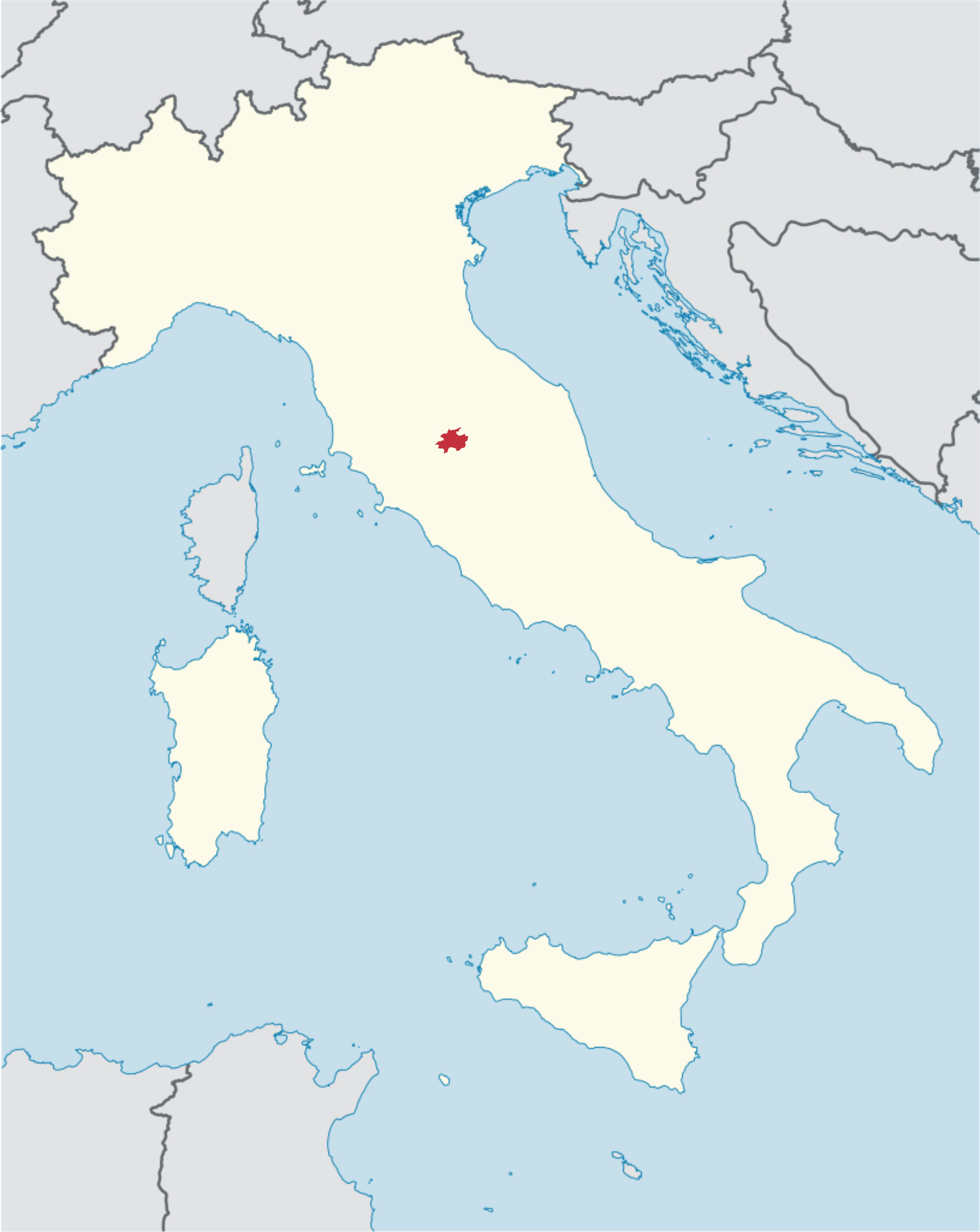

Website
- www.cittadicastello.chiesacattolica.it

The Diocese of Città di Castello (Latin: Dioecesis Civitatis Castelli o Tifernatensis) is a Latin diocese of the Catholic Church in the ecclesiastical province of the metropolitan Archdiocese of Perugia-Città della Pieve, in the central Italian region of Umbria.

Its cathedral episcopal see is a Minor basilica: Basilica Cattedrale di Ss. Florido e Amanzio Basilica, dedicated to Saints Floridus (the diocesan patron saint) and Amantius, in Città di Castello. The province and diocese have a Marian second Minor Basilica: Santuario-Basilica della Madonna del Transito Santuario, in Canoscio.

== History ==
=== Territory ===
During the persecution of Diocletian (303), St. Crescentianus, a Roman knight, and ten others suffered martyrdom at Tifernum. Crescentianus killed a dragon before he was decapitated. The bishopric was erected circa 450 AD. In 550, by order of the Ostrogothic king Totila, the city then known as Tifernum or Civitas Tiberina was captured and destroyed. Città di Castello was later rebuilt around a castle, giving origin to the name used today.

In 590, the diocese of Tifernum gained territory from the suppressed Diocese of Sant'Angelo in Vado. The bishop was Floridus, who attended the synod of Pope Gregory I in 593.

By the Donation of Pepin (752), it became subject to the Holy See. It lost territories in 1013, to establish the Territorial Abbey of Sansepolcro, and on 19 June 1325 to establish the Diocese of Cortona.

The first-known bishop of this see was Ennodius, present at a Roman council (465) under Pope Hilary.

In 711 Arian Longobards put to death the bishop of the city, Albertus, and his deacon Britius.

In 875 Bishop Rainaldus was summoned to appear before the papal apocrisiarius Gregory and the magister militum Georgius, the vestiarius of the Patriarch of Aquileia, to answer a charge of homicide. Having failed to deal with the situation, despite several letters of excommunication, Rainaldus was summoned by Pope John VIII to appear in Rome and stand trial. Rainaldus appeared at the papal court, but stealthily avoided taking his seat in the synod, and instead fled the city by going over the walls like a thief. Revealing himself to be guilty, he was immediately excommunicated and interdicted. The Pope announced the result in a letter to the Emperor Louis.

Pope Celestine II (Guido di Castello) (1143–1144) was a native of Città di Castello.

In 1320 Margaret of Castello died.

In 1375 Città di Castello joined in the insurrection of other cities of the Papal States. Cardinal Robert of Geneva (later Pope Clement VII, Avignon Obedience), undertook to recapture it with Breton mercenaries, but was repulsed. Under Pope Martin V, however, it was taken by Braccio da Montone (1420). Later, Nicolò Vitelli, with the help of Florence and Milan, became absolute ruler.

In 1474 Pope Sixtus IV sent an army commanded by his nephew, Cardinal Giuliano della Rovere (later Pope Julius II). After fruitless negotiations Cardinal Giuliano laid siege to the city, but Vitelli did not surrender until he learned that the command of the army had been given to Duke Federigo of Urbino. The following year Vitelli tried unsuccessfully to recapture the city; fear of Cesare Borgia alone induced him to desist.

On 22 September 1515 it lost more territory to the Territorial Abbey of Sansepolcro.

=== Synods ===
A diocesan synod was an irregular but important meeting of the bishop of a diocese and his clergy. Its purpose was (1) to proclaim generally the various decrees already issued by the bishop; (2) to discuss and ratify measures on which the bishop chose to consult with his clergy; (3) to publish statutes and decrees of the diocesan synod, of the provincial synod, and of the Holy See.

Bishop Giovanni Battista Lattanzi (1750–1782) held his first diocesan synod on 23–25 September 1766.

Bishop Francesco Antonio Mondelli (1814–1825) held a diocesan synod on 8–10 April 1818.

Bishop Giovanni Muzi held a diocesan synod on 1 June 1835.

Letterio Turchi (1850–1861) held a diocesan synod on 14–16 June 1853.

== Bishops ==
=== to 1200 ===
- Ennodius (attested 465)

...
[Marius ? (499)]

- Innocentius (attested 501, 502)

...

- Floridus (attested c. 590)

...

- Luminosus (attested 649).

...'

- Albertus (c. 700–711)
- Theodorus (attested 715)
- Tacipertus (attested 752)
- Bonifacius (attested 761)
- Leo (attested 769)

...

- Ingizo (attested 967–999)

...

- Pietro (Petrus) (1023? – 1048)
- Pietro (1048? – ?)
- Ermanno (Herman) (attested 1050 – 1059)
- Fulcone (attested 1068)
- Tebaldus (1071–1101 ?)
- Ridolfo (c. 1102–1105)
- Giovanni (John) (1105 – death 1124.09.12)
- Ranieri (1124–1129)
- Guido (1135 – death 1137.05.14)
- Divizzo (1141 – 1146)
- Ubaldo (? – 1150?)
- Pietro first time (1153.10.10 – 1167), see below
- Tedelmanno (? – 1167?)
- Pietro again see above (1172 – death 1178.07.28)
- Ranieri (1178 – death 1204.06.07)

=== 1200 to 1500 ===
- Rolando (1205–1206)
- Giovanni (1206–1226)
- Cortosonno (1227–1228)
- Matteo Suppolini (1229–1233)
- Azzo (1234–1251)
- Pietro Rossi (1252–1265)
- Niccolò, O. Praem. (1265–1279)
- Giacomo Cavalcanti (1279–1301)
- Ugolino Gualterotti (1301–1320)
- Ugolino della Branca (1320.03.16 – death 1346)
- Pietro Riccardi (1347.02.19 – 1358)
- Buccio Bonori (1358.05.04 – death 1374.08.26)
- Niccolò Marciari (1374.12.04 – 1378)
- Ettore Orsini (1379.10.07 – 1387.07.17)
- Bandello Bandelli (1387.07.15 [1387.09.16] – 1407.03.14)
- Giovanni del Pozzo (1407–1409)
- Bernardo Bartolomei, O.S.M. (1409–1423)
- Sirubaldo degli Ubaldi (1424–1441)
- Radulphus, O.S.A. (8 March 1441 – death 9 June 1460)
- Giovanni Gianderoni, O.S.A. (4 July 1460 – 15 July 1474)
- Bartolomeo Maraschi (15 July 1474 – death Sep 1487)
- Giovanni Battista Lagni (27 Sep 1487 – 18 Jan 1493)
- Archbishop-bishop Nicola Ippoliti (13 Jan 1493 – 10 Jan 1498)
- Ventura Bufalini (18 Jan 1498 – 17 April 1499)

=== 1500 to 1800 ===
- Giulio Vitelli (17 April 1499 – retired 4 August 1503)
- Antonio Maria Ciocchi del Monte (4 August 1503 – 6 Feb 1506)
- Achille Grassi (14 Feb 1506 – resigned 1515)
- Baldassarre Caetano de Grassi (1515 – ?retired 17 Feb 1535)

Apostolic Administrator Cardinal Marino Grimani
(19 April 1534 – resigned 4 March 1539)

- Alessandro Stefano Filodori, O.P. (5 March 1539 – ?retired 1554)
- Vitellozzo Vitelli (1554–1560) Administrator
- Costantino Bonelli (7 Feb 1560 – 4 April 1572 Died)
- Antimo Marchesani (2 June 1572 – 27 Oct 1581 Died)
- Ludovico Bentivoglio (26 Nov 1581 – 19 Sep 1602 Died)
- Valeriano Muti (1602–1610)
- Luca Semproni (1610–1616)
- Evangelista Tornioli, O.S.B. (23 March 1616 – 27 Nov 1630 Died)
- Cesare Raccagna (1632–1646)
- Francesco Boccapaduli (1647–1672)
- Giuseppe Maria Sebastiani, O.C.D. (1672–1689)
- Giuseppe Musotti (17 April 1690 – 1692 Resigned)
- Luca Antonio Eustachi (9 March 1693 – 4 Nov 1715 Died)
- Alessandro Francesco Codebò (8 June 1716 –1733)
- Ottavio Gasparini (20 Jan 1734 – 12 Sep 1749 Died)
- Giovanni Battista Lattanzi (23 Feb 1750 – 23 Feb 1782 Resigned)
- Pietro Boscarini (1782–1801)

=== Since 1800 ===
- Paolo Bartoli (23 Dec 1801 – 19 Jan 1810 Died)
- Francesco Antonio Mondelli (1814–1825)
- Giovanni Alessandro Muzi (1825–1849)
- Letterio Turchi (1850–1861)
- Paolo Antonio Micaleff (Micallef), O.S.A. (1863–1871)
- Giuseppe Moreschi (24 Nov 1871 – 9 Nov 1887 Died)
- Domenico Fegatelli (1888–1891)
- Dario Mattei-Gentili (1891–1895)
- Aristide Golfieri (29 Nov 1895 – 1 May 1909 Died)

[Giustino Sanchini (1909) Bishop-elect]

- Carlo Liviero (8 Jan 1910 – 7 July 1932 Died)
- Maurizio Francesco Crotti, O.F.M. Cap. (20 March 1933 – 25 July 1934 Died)
- Filippo Maria Cipriani (29 Sep 1934 – 8 Oct 1956 Died)
- Luigi Cicuttini (30 Nov 1956 – 7 Sep 1966 Resigned)
- Cesare Pagani (22 Jan 1972 – 21 Nov 1981), next Archbishop of Perugia)
- Carlo Urru (21 April 1982 – 7 Feb 1991 Retired)
- Pellegrino Tomaso Ronchi, O.F.M. Cap. (7 Feb 1991 – 16 June 2007 Retired)
- Domenico Cancian, F.A.M. (16 June 2007 – May 7, 2022 Retired)
- Luciano Paolucci Bedini (18 June 2022 - ; concurrently bishop of Gubbio)

== See also ==
- List of Catholic dioceses in Italy

== Books ==
- Gams, Pius Bonifatius (1873). Series episcoporum Ecclesiae catholicae: quotquot innotuerunt a beato Petro apostolo (in Latin). Ratisbon: Typis et Sumptibus Georgii Josephi Manz. pp. 683–684.
- Eubel, Conradus, ed. (1913). Hierarchia catholica (in Latin). Vol. 1 (second ed.). Münster: Libreria Regensbergiana. (in Latin)
- Eubel, Conradus, ed. (1914). Hierarchia catholica (in Latin). Vol. 2 (second ed.). Münster: Libreria Regensbergiana.
- Eubel, Conradus (1923). Gulik, Guilelmus (ed.). Hierarchia catholica (in Latin). Vol. 3 (second ed.). Münster: Libreria Regensbergiana.
- Gauchat, Patritius (Patrice) (1935). Hierarchia catholica. Vol. 4 (1592-1667). Münster: Libraria Regensbergiana.
- Ritzler, Remigius; Sefrin, Pirminus (1952). Hierarchia catholica medii et recentis aevi. Vol. 5 (1667-1730). Patavii: Messagero di S. Antonio.
- Ritzler, Remigius; Sefrin, Pirminus (1958). Hierarchia catholica medii et recentis aevi. Vol. 6 (1730-1799). Patavii: Messagero di S. Antonio.
- Ritzler, Remigius; Sefrin, Pirminus (1968). Hierarchia Catholica medii et recentioris aevi (in Latin). Vol. 7 (1800–1846). Monasterii: Libreria Regensburgiana.
- Remigius Ritzler; Pirminus Sefrin (1978). Hierarchia catholica Medii et recentioris aevi (in Latin). Vol. 8 (1846–1903). Il Messaggero di S. Antonio.
- Pięta, Zenon (2002). Hierarchia catholica medii et recentioris aevi (in Latin). Vol. 9 (1903–1922). Padua: Messagero di San Antonio. ISBN 978-88-250-1000-8.

=== Studies ===
- Cappelletti, Giuseppe (1846). Le Chiese d'Italia dalla loro origine sino ai nostri giorni (in Italian). Vol. IV. Giuseppe Antonelli. pp. 581–748.
- Czortek, Andrea (2016). "I vescovi di Città di Castello dell’XI secolo e il culto dei santi patroni", in: Pagine altotiberine 57/58, pp. 161–182. (in Italian)
- Kehr, Paul Fridolin (1909). Italia Pontificia Vol. IV: Vmbria, Picenum, Marsia. Berlin: Weidmann, pp. 99–112. (in Latin).
- Lanzoni, Francesco (1927). Le diocesi d'Italia dalle origini al principio del secolo VII (an. 604). Faenza: F. Lega, pp. 482–483. (in Italian)
- Lazzari, Francesco Ignatio (1693). Serie de' Vescovi e breve notizia di città de Castello (in Italian). Fuligno: Gaetano Zenobi.
- Magherini-Graziani, Giovanni (1890). Storia di Città di Castello (in Italian). Vol. I. Citta di Castello: S. Lapi.
- Magherini-Graziani, Giovanni (1890). Storia di Citta di Castello (in Italian). Vol. II–III (Citta di Castello ed.).
- Muzi, Giovanni (1844). Memorie ecclesiastiche e civili di Città di Castello (in Italian). Vol. primo. Città di Castello: Donati. Muzi, Giovanni (1842). Volume secondo. Muzi, Giovanni (1843). Volume terzo. Muzi, Giovanni (1843). Volume quarto.
- Schwartz, Gerhard (1913). Die besetzung der bistümer Reichs italiens unter den sächsischen und saliche kaisern : mit den listen der bischöfe, 951-1122, Leipzig-Berlin, pp. 279–280. (in German)
- Ughelli, Ferdinando (1717). Coleti, Nicolò (ed.). Italia sacra: sive De episcopis Italiae et insularum adjacentium, rebusque abiis praeclare gestis... (in Latin). Vol. Tomus primus (secunda ed.). apud Sebastianum Coleti. pp. 1316–1326.
