= Alessandro Sperelli =

17th-century Roman Catholic bishop

Most Reverend Alessandro Sperelli
- Bishop of Gubbio
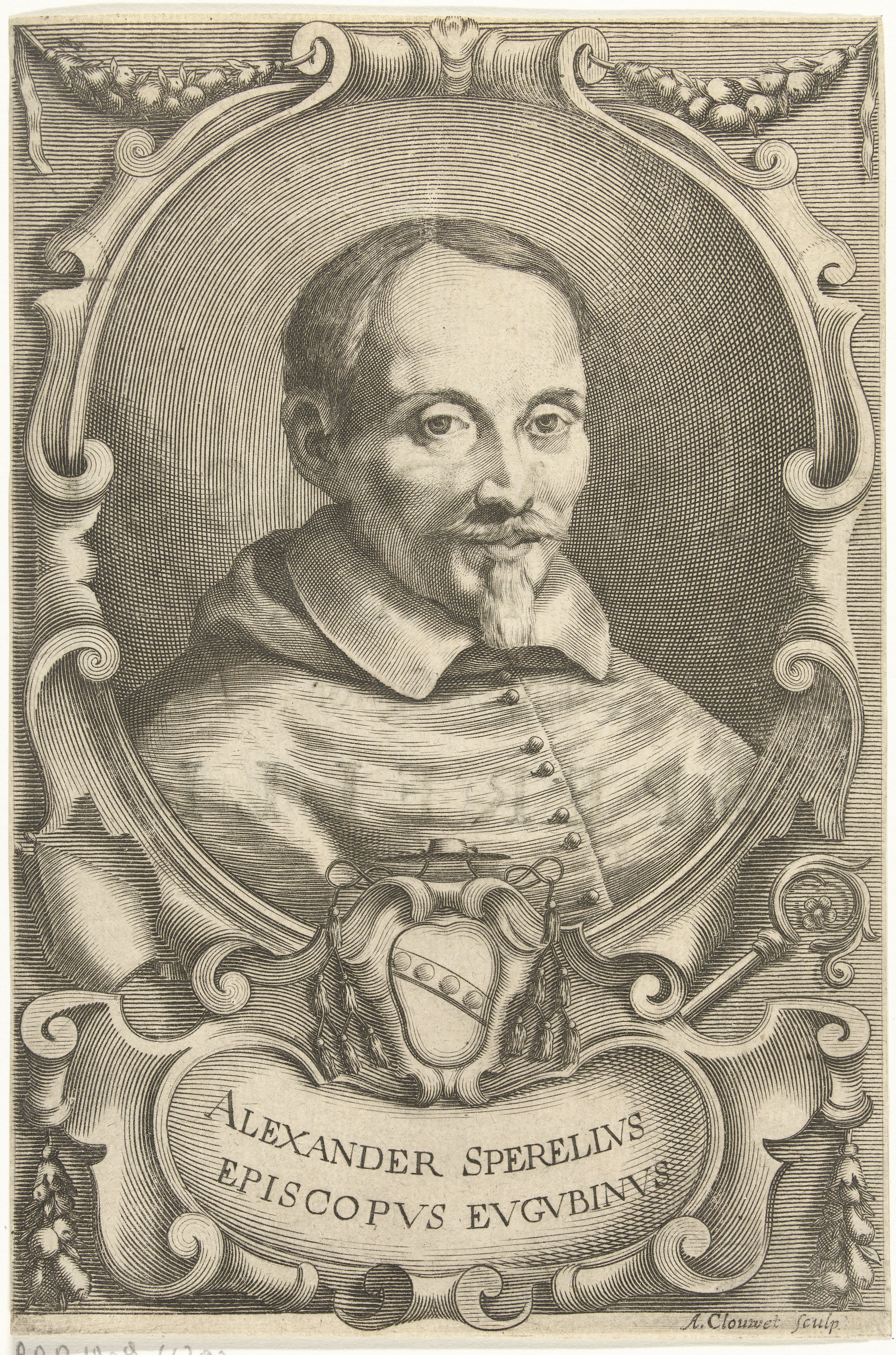
- Church: Catholic Church
- Diocese: Diocese of Gubbio
- In office: 1644–1671
- Predecessor: Emilio Bonaventura Altieri
- Successor: Giulio Spinola

Orders
- Consecration: 4 May 1642 by Giulio Cesare Sacchetti

Personal details
- Born: May 10, 1589 Assisi, Italy
- Died: 19 December 1671 (aged 82)

Alessandro Sperelli C.O. (1589–1671) was a Roman Catholic prelate who served as Bishop of Gubbio (1644–1671), Apostolic Nuncio to Naples (1652–1653), Auxiliary Bishop of Ostia e Velletri (1642–1644), and Titular Bishop of Orthosias in Caria (1642–1644).

== Biography ==
Alessandro Sperelli was born on May 5, 1589 in Assisi, Italy and ordained a priest in the Congregation of the Oratory of Saint Philip Neri. His nephew Sperello Sperelli would become cardinal in 1699. On 28 Apr 1642, he was appointed during the papacy of Pope Urban VIII as Titular Bishop of Orthosias in Caria and Auxiliary Bishop of Ostia e Velletri. On 4 May 1642, he was consecrated bishop by Giulio Cesare Sacchetti, Cardinal-Priest of Santa Susanna, with Lelio Falconieri, Titular Archbishop of Thebae, and Giovanni Battista Altieri (seniore), Bishop Emeritus of Camerino, serving as co-consecrators. On 14 Mar 1644, he was appointed during the papacy of Pope Urban VIII as Bishop of Gubbio. On 23 Oct 1652, he was appointed during the papacy of Pope Innocent X as Apostolic Nuncio to Naples; he served as nuncio until 15 Nov 1653. He served as Bishop of Gubbio until his death on 19 Dec 1671.

While bishop, he was the principal co-consecrator of Carlo Labia, Archbishop of Corfù (1659).

In 1666, his endowment of his large collection of books and manuscripts to the city led to the formation of the Biblioteca Comunale Sperelliana in Gubbio.

== External links and additional sources ==
- Coletti, Chiara (2019). "Sperelli, Alessandro". Dizionario Biografico degli Italiani (in Italian). Vol. 93: Sisto V–Stammati. Rome: Istituto dell'Enciclopedia Italiana. ISBN 978-88-12-00032-6.
- Cheney, David M. "Nunciature to Naples". Catholic-Hierarchy.org. (for Chronology of Bishops) ^{[self-published]}
- Cheney, David M. "Diocese of Gubbio". Catholic-Hierarchy.org. (for Chronology of Bishops) ^{[self-published]}
- Chow, Gabriel. "Diocese of Gubbio (Italy)". GCatholic.org. (for Chronology of Bishops) ^{[self-published]}

Catholic Church titles
Preceded by Georges Alexandre Dorpowski	Titular Bishop of Orthosias in Caria; 1642–1644	Succeeded by Piotr Jan Sokołowski
Preceded by	Auxiliary Bishop of Ostia e Velletri; 1642–1644	Succeeded by
Preceded by Orazio Monaldi	Bishop of Gubbio; 1644–1671	Succeeded by Carlo Vincenzo Toti
Preceded by Emilio Bonaventura Altieri	Apostolic Nuncio to Naples; 1652–1653	Succeeded by Giulio Spinola
