= Sansepolcro Cathedral =

Catholic church in Sansepolcro, Tuscany, central Italy

Coordinates: 43.5708°N 12.1415°E

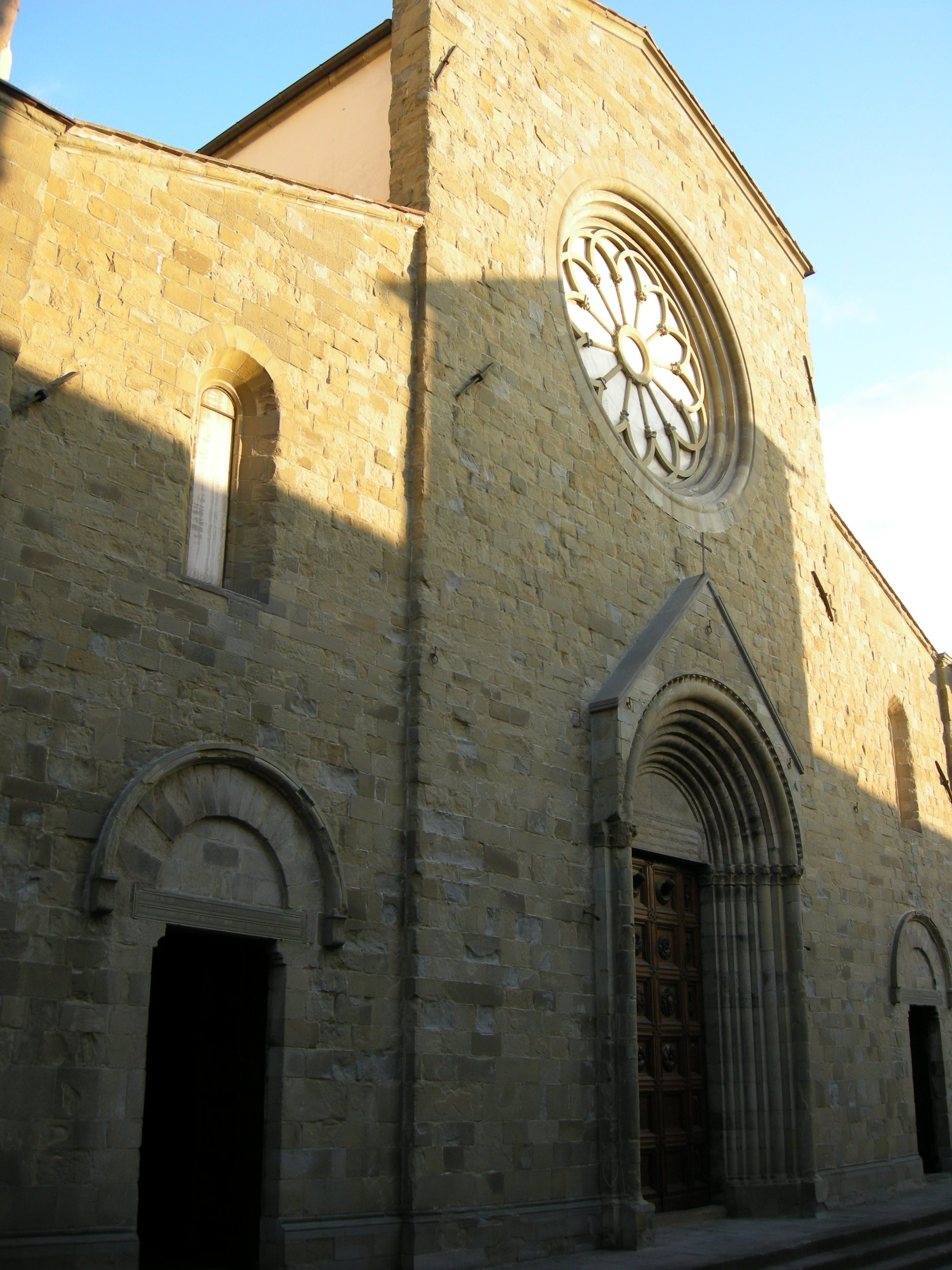
Cathedral of Sansepolcro.

The Cathedral of Sansepolcro (Italian: Duomo di Sansepolcro; officially a co-cathedral) is a Catholic church in Sansepolcro, Tuscany, central Italy.

== History ==
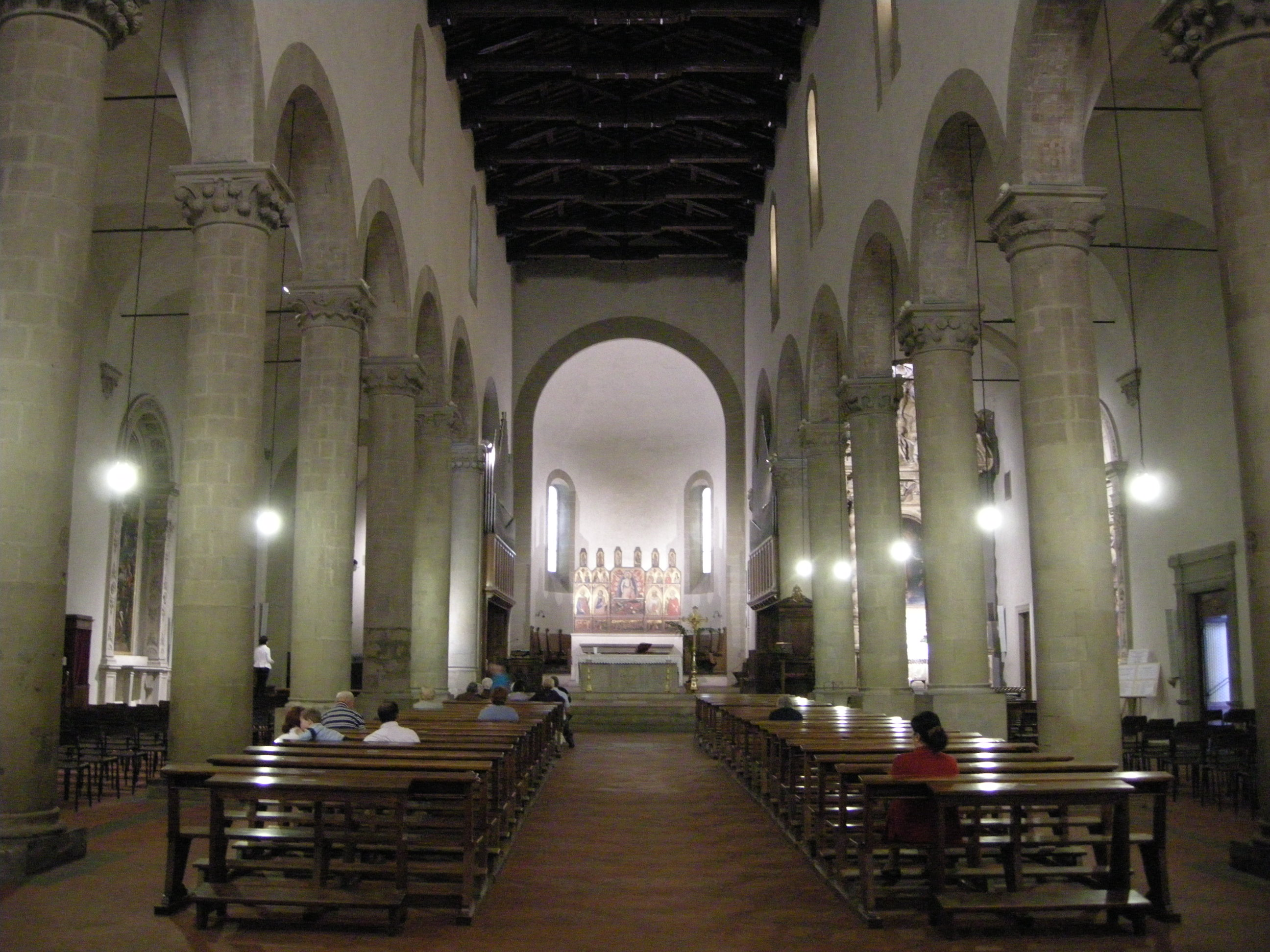
Interior view.

According to tradition, the foundations of the cathedral dates to the 9th century, when two natives of the region who had been pilgrims in the Holy Land, Arcanus and Giles (or Egidio and Arcano), returned and settled on the site. There they built a chapel dedicated to Saint Leonard and established a monastic way of life. They had brought a stone from the Church of the Holy Sepulcher in Jerusalem (thus, San Sepolcro) with them from that shrine, leading it to become a popular pilgrimage site.

The first historical mention of a Benedictine monastery, dedicated to the Holy Sepulcher and the Four Evangelists, is documented as of 1012; the Abbey of Sansepolcro. The church was constructed in 1012–1049, initially dedicated to the Four Evangelists and the Holy Sepulchre (deriving from Sansepolcro's name). The monastery was declared an abbey nullius. A commune began to develop around the abbey due to its being declared a market town in 1038 by the Emperor Conrad II. During the 12th century, the monastery, a holder of numerous properties around central Italy in its own right, elected to be incorporated into the Camaldolese Order, based in the region. The monastic chapter soon (13th century) tore down the original chapel and built a large Romanesque-style church, dedicated to St. John the Evangelist (the patron saint of the city) to serve its spiritual needs.

In 1520, the monastic community was suppressed and the abbey nullius was promoted by the Holy See to the rank of a regular diocese, for which the abbey church was declared the cathedral. Pope Leo X established the diocese of Sansepolcro, with the church becoming its cathedral; the cathedral was re-dedicated to the city's patron, St. John the Evangelist. The first bishop appointed to lead the diocese was the last abbot of the abbey, Galeotto Graziani, O.Cam. The episcopal palace for the diocese stands on the site of the former monastery and its cloister, still with 15th-century frescoes depicting the life of St. Benedict, as well as the tomb of the artist Piero della Francesca, a native of the city.

Large restoration works were carried on between 1934 and 1943, destroying most of the Baroque elements added in the course of the centuries to the original medieval edifice. Several frescoes by the Riminese school and by Bartolomeo della Gatta (14th-15th centuries) become visible again, and a new chapel, called Cappella del Volto Santo, was added to house the so-called "Holy Face" icon, previously located at the altar. A new choir was built in 1966–1967.

The church became a co-cathedral with the merge of the dioceses of Arezzo, Sansepolcro and Cortona in 1986.

== Description ==
With the exception of the apse area, the church has maintained the 14th century basilica plan with a nave and two aisles. Romanesque elements include the internal round arcades, the capitals and the general proportions. More influenced by Gothic (a style which was becoming widespread when the church was being built) are the portal of the façade and window above. The rose window is the result of a later restoration.

Originally the church should receive a more elongated Gothic polygonal apse, replaced by a bell tower influenced by Umbrian similar structures.

Works of art in the interior include the Incredulity of St. Thomas by Santi di Tito (1576–1577), a Crucifixion fresco by Bartolomeo della Gatta (1486), an Adoration of the Shepherd by Durante Alberti and, at the high altar, the Resurrection Polyptych by Niccolò di Segna (c. 1348). At the left aisle is the so-called Sansepolcro Altarpiece, or Ascension of Christ, executed by Renaissance master Perugino around 1510.

Annexed to the church is the Bishop's Palace, one part of the original abbey. Its cloister has 16th-century frescoes depicting the Life of St. Benedict, as well as the tomb of artist Piero della Francesca.

== Sources ==
- Ricci, I. (1943). L'abbazia camaldolese e la cattedrale di S. Sepolcro, Sansepolcro. Tipografia Boncompagni.
