= Bedini =

Bedini is a surname. Notable people with the surname include:

- Gaetano Bedini (1806–1864), Italian Catholic church dignitary
- Silvio Bedini (1917–2007), American historian
- Ignazio Bedini (born 1937), Italian Catholic archbishop
- Luciano Paolucci Bedini (born 1968), Italian Catholic bishop

== See also ==
- 16672 Bedini
- Bedini Bugyal, a Himalayan alpine meadow
