= Galeotto Graziani =

Italian monk

Very Reverend Galeotto Graziani, O.Cam.
- Bishop of Sansepolcro
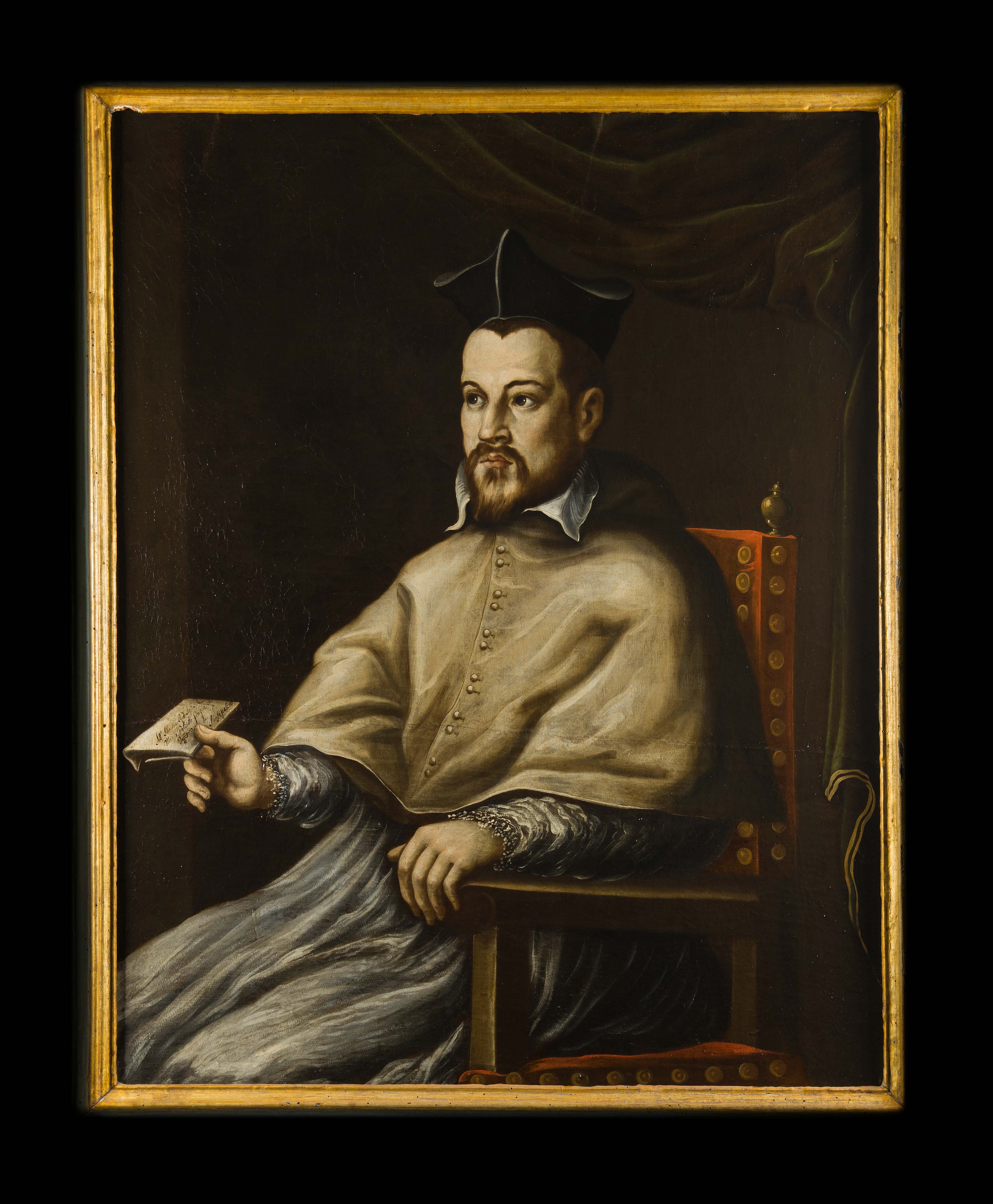
- Church: Catholic Church
- Diocese: Diocese of Sansepolcro
- Appointed: 17 September 1520
- Installed: 3 January 1521
- Term ended: 15 April 1522
- Successor: Leonardo Tornabuoni
- Previous post: Abbot of the Abbey of Sansepolcro (1509-1522)

Orders
- Consecration: 3 January 1521

Personal details
- Died: 15 April 1522 Sansepolcro, Republic of Florence

Galeotto Graziani, O.Cam. (1450(?) – 15 April 1522), was an Italian monk of the Camaldolese Order and Roman Catholic prelate who served as the first Bishop of Sansepolcro (1520–1522).

== Biography ==
Galeotto Graziani, born possibly sometime about 1450, became a monk of the Camaldolese Abbey of Sansepolcro in Tuscany, an abbey nullius, where he was ordained a priest. He was elected abbot of the community in 1509.

On 17 September 1520, the abbey was suppressed by Pope Leo X and its territory was made a part of the new Diocese of Sansepolcro. At that time, the pope appointed Graziani to be the first Bishop of Sansepolcro, for which he was consecrated a bishop on 3 January of the following year. He served in this office until his death on 15 April 1522.

Catholic Church titles
Preceded by	Bishop of Sansepolcro; 1520–1522	Succeeded by Leonardo Tornabuoni
