= Filippo Salviati (bishop) =

Catholic prelate

Most Reverend Filippo Salviati
- Bishop of Sansepolcro
- Church: Catholic Church
- Diocese: Diocese of Sansepolcro
- In office: 1619–1634
- Predecessor: Giovanni dei Gualtieri
- Successor: Zanobi de' Medici

Orders
- Consecration: 18 August 1619 by Ottavio Bandini

Personal details
- Born: 1578 Florence, Italy
- Died: 1634 (age 56) Sansepolcro, Italy

Filippo Salviati (1578–1634) was a Catholic prelate who served as Bishop of Sansepolcro (1619–1634).

== Biography ==
Filippo Salviati was born in Florence, Italy in 1578.

He had been Provost of the cathedral Chapter of Prato.

On 12 August 1619, he was appointed Bishop of Sansepolcro by Pope Paul V. On 18 August 1619, he was consecrated bishop by Ottavio Bandini, Cardinal-Priest of San Lorenzo in Lucina, with Francesco Sacrati, Titular Archbishop of Damascus, and Horace Capponi, Bishop Emeritus of Carpentras, serving as co-consecrators.

In Fall 1629, Bishop Salviati conducted a formal visitation of the ecclesiastical institutions in his diocese.

He died in 1634.

Catholic Church titles
| Preceded by Giovanni dei Gualtieri | Bishop of Sansepolcro; 1619–1634 | Succeeded by Zanobi de' Medici |
