= Pietro Bottaccioli =

Italian Roman Catholic bishop

- Bishop of Gubbio
- Church: Catholic Church
- Diocese: Diocese of Gubbio
- In office: 26 April 1989 – 23 December 2004
- Predecessor: Ennio Antonelli
- Successor: Mario Ceccobelli

Orders
- Ordination: 1 October 1950
- Consecration: 16 May 1989 by Bernardin Gantin

Personal details
- Born: 15 February 1928 Umbertide, Province of Perugia, Kingdom of Italy
- Died: 22 January 2017 (aged 88)

Pietro Bottaccioli (15 February 1928 – 22 January 2017) was a Roman Catholic bishop.

Ordained to the priesthood in 1950, Bottaccioli served as bishop of the Roman Catholic Diocese of Gubbio, Italy, from 1989 to 2004.
