= Evangelista Tornioli =

Italian Catholic prelate

Most Reverend Evangelista Tornioli
- Bishop of Città di Castello
- Church: Catholic Church
- Diocese: Diocese of Città di Castello
- In office: 1616–1630
- Predecessor: Luca Semproni
- Successor: Cesare Raccagna

Personal details
- Born: 1570 Perugia, Italy
- Died: 27 November 1630 (age 60) Città di Castello, Italy

Evangelista Tornioli, O.S.B. (1570–1630) was a Catholic prelate who served as Bishop of Città di Castello (1616–1630).

== Biography ==
Evangelista Tornioli was born in Perugia, Italy in 1570 and ordained a priest in the Order of Saint Benedict. On 23 March 1616, he was appointed during the papacy of Pope Urban VIII as Bishop of Città di Castello. He served as Bishop of Città di Castello until his death on 27 November 1630.

== Episcopal succession ==
While bishop, he was the principal co-consecrator of:

- Michele Bonzi, Bishop of Ravello e Scala (1617);
- Alfonso Sacrati, Bishop of Comacchio (1617);
- Fabrizio Landriani, Bishop of Pavia (1617);
- Alessandro Scappi, Bishop of Satriano e Campagna (1618);
- Ippolito Borghese (bishop), Bishop of Montalcino (1618); and
- Marsilio Peruzzi, Archbishop of Chieti (1618).

== External links and additional sources ==
- Cheney, David M. "Nunciature to Naples". Catholic-Hierarchy.org. (for Chronology of Bishops) ^{[self-published]}
- Cheney, David M. "Diocese of Città di Castello". Catholic-Hierarchy.org. (for Chronology of Bishops) ^{[self-published]}
- Chow, Gabriel. "Diocese of Città di Castello". GCatholic.org. (for Chronology of Bishops) ^{[self-published]}

Catholic Church titles
Preceded by Luca Semproni	Bishop of Città di Castello; 1616–1630	Succeeded by Cesare Raccagna
