= Canoscio =

- Frazione
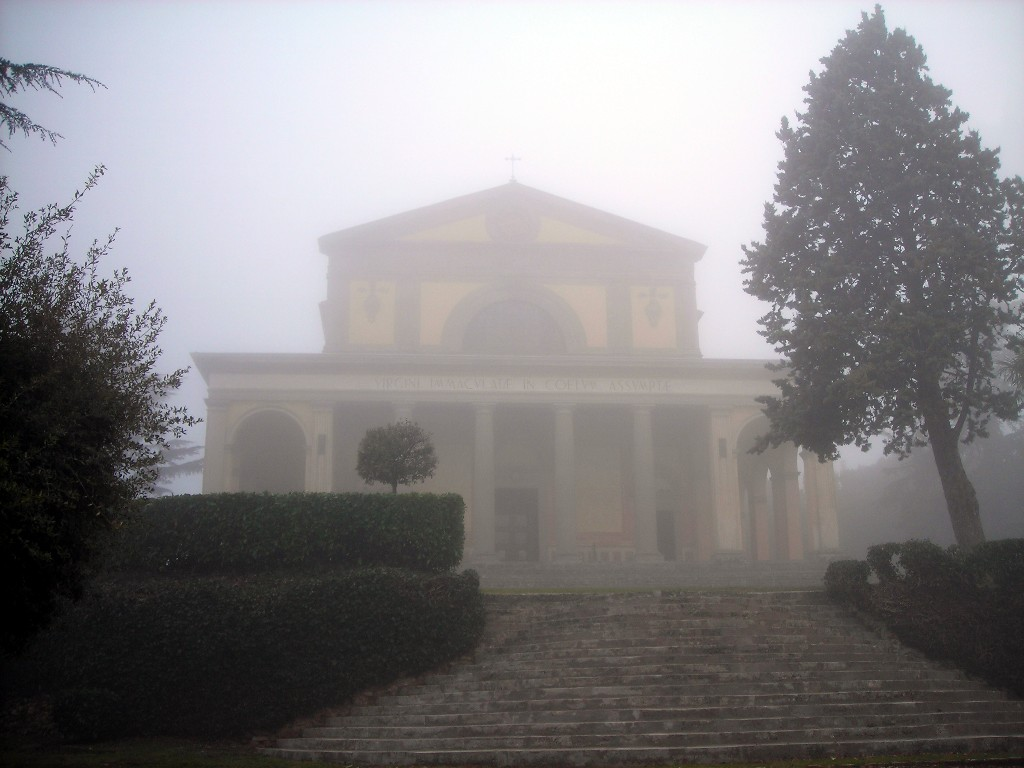
- The façade of the sanctuary in the mist.

- Location of Canoscio in Italy
- Coordinates: 43°23′N 12°13′E
- Country: Italy
- Region: Umbria
- Province: Perugia
- Comune: Città di Castello
- Elevation: 449 m (1,473 ft)
- Time zone: UTC+1 (CET)
  - Summer (DST): UTC+2 (CEST)

Canoscio is an Italian village and frazione (hamlet) of Città di Castello, Umbria.

== History ==
=== Overview ===
It is home to the Shrine of the Madonna of Canoscio (Italian: Santuario della Madonna di Canoscio), atop a hill overlooking the upper valley of the Tiber at 449 m. The church has its origins in a votive chapel dedicated to the Madonna of the Assumption that was built by a certain Giovanni di Jacopo in 1348, for having been spared during the Black Death. The chapel was enlarged in 1406.

The present church in traditional Tuscan style celebrating the dogma of the Immaculate Conception was built in 1855‑1878 by architect Emilio de Fabris, better known for the sensitive Gothic façade he provided for the Duomo of Florence. The shrine of Madonna di Canoscio remains a center of Marian devotion today. In 1998, Pope John Paul II raised the sanctuary church to the honor of a Minor Basilica.

Another sight on the hill of Canoscio is a large 12th‑century Romanesque church, the Pieve of SS. Cosma e Damiano, with medieval votive frescoes.

=== The Canoscio hoard ===
Canoscio was the site where a 6th‑century paleo-Christian dinner service of 25 silver pieces came to light under the plough in 1935: the pieces in the Canoscio hoard, now displayed in the Museo del Duomo, Città di Castello, as Early Christian liturgical silver, may not all have been expressly designed for liturgical use. The pieces, found carefully stowed under a large plate for protection as they were being buried in a shallow pit, consist of six plates, two patens, three unmarked hemispherical chalices, a pyx with its cover, also unmarked, two strainers, a small ladle and nine spoons of purely domestic character. Not all the objects are in forms that can be related to the liturgy. Names of Aelianus and Felicitas, probably donors, are inscribed on one of the patens. The large plate that protected the hoard, was shattered by the plough: reassembled, it reveals the inscription in its center DE DONIS DEI ET SANCTI MARTYRIS AGAPITI UTERE FELIX.

The largest of the unbroken plates was surely designed for a liturgical use from the beginning: in the center there is a raised surface familiar from pagan paterae, which kept the thumb free of the libation when making an offering. The central section is chased with a Byzantine Cross with alpha and omega: below flow four rivers. At the side of the cross are depicted the hand of God and the dove of the Holy Spirit; at the bottom there are two lambs facing each other.

The larger of the two strainers is engraved with the labarum and alpha and omega, their outlines traced with tiny straining holes.
