= Luciano Paolucci Bedini =

Italian Catholic bishop (born 1968)

- Bishop of Gubbio; Bishop of Città di Castello
- Church: Roman Catholic Church
- Diocese: Gubbio; Città di Castello
- Installed: 29 September 2017 (Gubbio); 18 June 2022 (Città di Castello)
- Predecessor: Mario Ceccobelli (Gubbio); Domenico Cancian (Città di Castello)

Orders
- Ordination: 30 September 1995 by Franco Festorazzi
- Consecration: 3 December 2017 by Edoardo Menichelli

Personal details
- Born: 30 August 1968 (age 56); Jesi, Marche, Italy
- Education: Theological Institute of the Marches (BTh); Salesian Pontifical University (LTh)
- Coat of arms

Luciano Paolucci Bedini (born 30 August 1968) is an Italian Roman Catholic prelate who is currently the Bishop of the Diocese of Gubbio and the Diocese of Città di Castello. Bedini was ordained a priest in the Archdiocese of Ancona–Osimo by its archbishop, Franco Festorazzi on 30 September 1995. Before that, he obtained a Bachelor of Theology from the Theological Institute of the Marches. Bedini then attended the Salesian Pontifical University in Rome from 1996 to 1999 and obtained a Licentiate in Theology. Bedini was appointed as the Bishop of the Diocese of Gubbio on 29 September 2017 and was ordained a bishop by Cardinal Edoardo Menichelli on 3 December 2017. On 7 May 2022, Bedini was appointed as the Bishop of the Diocese of Città di Castello, uniting it with the Diocese of Gubbio in persona Episcopi. He was installed to the position on 18 June 2022.
