= Diocese of Gubbio =

Roman Catholic diocese in Italy

Coordinates: 43.3500°N 12.5667°E

Diocese of Gubbio Dioecesis Eugubina

Catholic
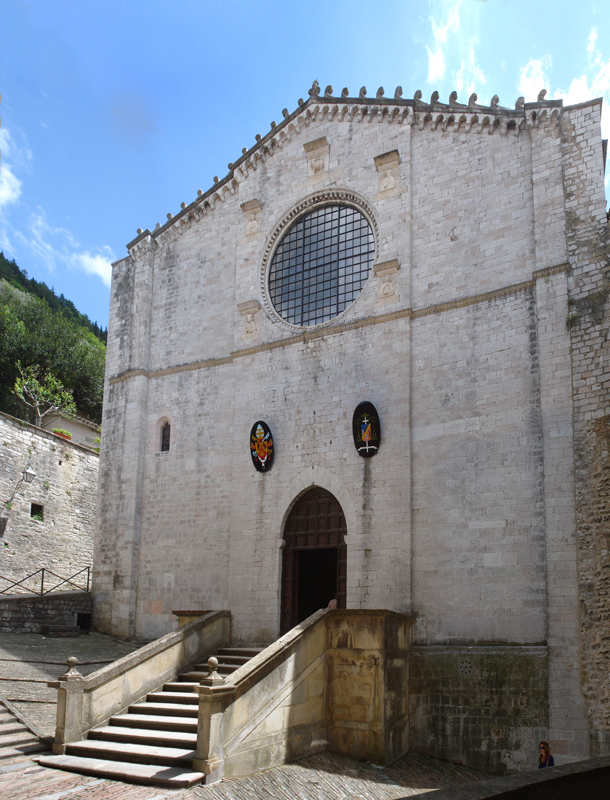
- Gubbio Cathedral

Location
- Country: Italy
- Ecclesiastical province: Perugia-Città della Pieve

Statistics
- Area: 900 km^{2} (350 sq mi)
- Population: Total; Catholics: (as of 2016); 53,000 (guess); 52,800 (guess) (99.6%)
- Parishes: 39

Information
- Denomination: Catholic Church
- Rite: Roman Rite
- Established: 5th century
- Cathedral: Cattedrale di Ss. Mariano e Giacomo Martiri
- Secular priests: 30 (diocesan); 19 (religious Orders); 9 Permanent Deacons

Current leadership
- Pope: Leo XIV
- Bishop: Luciano Paolucci Bedini
- Bishops emeritus: Mario Ceccobelli

Website
- Diocese of Gubbio (in Italian)

The Diocese of Gubbio (Latin: Dioecesis Eugubina) is a Latin diocese of the Catholic Church in the province of Perugia, in Umbria, central Italy.

== History ==
The earliest known Bishop of Gubbio is Decentius, though a letter of Pope Innocent I notes that he had predecessors. Gregory the Great (590–604) entrusted to Bishop Gaudiosus of Gubbio the spiritual care of Tadinum, about a mile from the modern Gualdo, which had been long without a bishop of its own.

In the eighth century Gubbio became part of the Patrimony of St. Peter, together with the duchy of Spoleto. Arsenius of Gubbio (855) together with Nicholas of Anagni, opposed the election of Pope Benedict III. It was often at war with Perugia, and its victory in 1151 over Perugia and ten other towns is famous. St. Ubald, bishop of the city, directed the campaign. Gubbio favoured the Ghibelline party; however, in 1260 the Guelphs surprised the town, and drove out the Ghibellines; who returned again in 1300 under the leadership of Uguccione della Faggiola, and Federico I da Montefeltro, whereupon Pope Boniface VIII sent his nephew Napoleone Orsini who drove them out once more.

Giovanni Gabrielli, lord of Gubbio, was expelled by Cardinal Albornoz (1354) and the town handed over to a pontifical vicar. In 1381, however, the bishop, Gabriele Gabrielli, succeeded in being appointed pontifical vicar and again, lord of Gubbio.

Other bishops of Gubbio were

- Rudolph Gabrielli (1061), honoured for his sanctity by Peter Damian;
- Alessandro Sperelli (1644), author of many learned works, who restored the cathedral.

=== Schism of 1159–1179 ===
The bishopric of Theobaldus Balbi, O.S.B. (1160–1179) was unfortunately a time of great upheaval in the Church. The papal conclave of September 1159 had produced two popes, and a schism. The majority of cardinals elected Cardinal Rolando Bandinelli, who called himself Pope Alexander III; a minority stood by Cardinal Octavianus de' Monticelli, who called himself Pope Victor IV. Victor was a friend and adherent of the Emperor Frederick Barbarossa. While Bishop Theobaldus professed obedience to Pope Alexander, Frederick appointed as Bishop of Gubbio the Abbot of the monastery of S. Donnato, Abbot Bonactus (Bonnato). The schism thus enveloped the diocese of Gubbio.

A grant to the Church of Gubbio by the Emperor Frederick, dated 8 November 1163, indicates that the Ghibellines were in full control of the city and that Bonactus was bishop-elect. Bishop Theobaldus had retreated to the monastery of Fonte Avellina, where he had been Prior before his election as bishop; there he remained until the death of the intruder Bonactus, in 1164 or 1165. The schismatic Pope Victor IV died on 20 April 1164, and his schismatic successor Guido Cremensis (Antipope Paschal III) died on 20 September 1168. Their successor, Joannes de Struma (Calixtus III), surrendered to the real Pope, Alexander III, on 29 August 1178. The remnants of the schism were liquidated at the Third Council of the Lateran in March 1179, by which time Bishop Theobaldus had died.

=== Suffragan ===
From time immemorial, the bishops of Gubbio had been directly subordinate (suffragans) of the Holy See (Papacy), with no supervisory archbishop intervening, and were therefore required to attend Roman synods. But in 1563 the situation was altered. In his bull Super universas of 4 June 1563, Pope Pius IV reorganized the administration of the territories of the March of Ancona by creating a new archbishopric by elevating the bishop and Archdiocese of Urbino. He created the new ecclesiastical province of Urbino, which was to include the dioceses of Cagli, Pesaro, Fossombrone, Montefeltro, Senigallia. and Gubbio. But, as a result of the resistance begun by Bishop Mariano Savelli, it was not until the eighteenth century that Urbino could exercise effective metropolitan jurisdiction.

In the 15th century, the dukedoms of Montefeltro and Urbino fell into the hands of the della Rovere family. But the family did not prosper, in terms of male heirs. In 1623, the aged duke, Francesco Maria II lost his only son to an epileptic seizure. Without suitable collateral relatives, he determined to leave his dukedoms to the Papacy, and, on 30 April 1624, the appropriate documents were registered in Rome. Taddeo Barberini, the nephew of Pope Urban VIII, took formal possession and appointed a governor, though Duke Francesco Maria continued to rule during his lifetime. When he died on 23 April 1631, Urbino, and Gubbio along with it, was incorporated into the Papal States.

In accordance with the decree Christus Dominus, chapter 40, of the Second Vatican Council, on 15 August 1972 Pope Paul VI issued the decree Animorum utilitate, in which he changed the status of the diocese of Perugia, from being directly dependent upon the Holy See to being a Metropolitan archdiocese. The ecclesiastical province of Perugia was to contain as suffragans the dioceses of Assisi, Citta di Castello, Citta della Pieve, Foligno, Nocera and Tadinum, and Gubbio. The diocese of Gubbio ceased to be dependent upon the archdiocese of Urbino.

=== Synods ===
A diocesan synod was an irregularly held, but important, meeting of the bishop of a diocese and his clergy. Its purpose was (1) to proclaim generally the various decrees already issued by the bishop; (2) to discuss and ratify measures on which the bishop chose to consult with his clergy; (3) to publish statutes and decrees of the diocesan synod, of the provincial synod, and of the Holy See.

Bishop Alessandro Sperelli (1644–1672) presided over seven diocesan synods; one was held on 10—12 July 1646, and another on 7—9 June 1650. Bishop Sostegno Maria Cavalli (1725–1747) held a diocesan synod in Gubbio in 1725; he held another on 13—15 September 1728. Bishop Vincenzo Massi (1821–1839) held a diocesan synod on 5—7 June 1827.

== Bishops of Gubbio ==
=== to 1200 ===
...

- Decentius (attested 416)

...

- Gaudiosus (attested 599)

...

- Florentinus (attested 769)

...

- Benenatus (Bennato) (attested 826)

...

- Erfo (attested 853)
- Arsenius (attested 855)
- Dominicus (attested 861)

...

- Joannes (attested 967, 968)

...

- Julianus (attested 1032)
- Teudaldus (attested 1036, 1044)

...

- Guido (attested 1057)
- Rodulfus (attested 1059)
- Pietro Damiani, O.S.B. (1060–1066 Resigned)
- Rodulfus
- Mainardus
- Ubaldus (attested 1068)
- Hugo (attested c. 1070–1074)
- Dominicus, O.S.B. (attested 1075)
- Rusticus (attested 1097)
- Joannes Laudensis (John of Lodi) (1105–1106)
- Joannes
- Stephanus (attested 1126, 1127)
- Ubaldo Baldassini (1129–1160)
- Theobaldus Balbi, O.S.B. (1160–1179)
- Offredus, O.S.B. (1179 – after 1184)
- Bentivoglius (attested 1188)
- Marcus (1195–1200)

=== 1200 to 1500 ===
- Albertus (1200–1206)
- Villanus, O.S.B. (attested 1206, 1237)
- Jacobus (Giacomo), O.Min. (d. c. 1278)
- Benvenutus, O.Min. (1278–1294?)
- Ventura (1295–1302
- Franciscus
- Joannes, O.P.
- Petrus
- Hugo, O.E.S.A.
- Franciscus
- Vesianus Rolandi, O.Min. (1346–1350)
- Joannes de Mailhaco, O.Min.
- Joannes Bencii Carruccii
- Gabriel Neccioli (1377–1384 Died)
- Adam de Dompno Martino, O.Min. (1384–1388) (Avignon Obedience)
- Lorenzo Corvini (1384–1390) (Roman Obedience)
- Bertrandus
- Matthaeus, O.Min. (1401–1405)
- Francesco Billi (1406–1444)
- Antonio Severini (1444–1472)
- Leonardo Griffo (1472–1482)
- Cardinal Girolamo Basso Della Rovere (1482–1492 Resigned)
- Cardinal Francesco Grosso della Rovere, O.Min. (1492–1504)

=== 1500 to 1800 ===
- Antonio Ferrero (1504–1508 Died) Administrator
- Federico Fregoso (1508–1541 Died) Administrator; Archbishop (personal title)
- Cardinal Pietro Bembo, O.S.Io.Hieros. (1541–1544) Administrator
- Cardinal Marcello Cervini (1544–1555 Elected, Pope)
- Giacomo Savelli (cardinal) (1555–1556 Resigned)
- Mariano Savelli (1560–1599 Died)
- Andrea Sorbolonghi (1600–1616 Died)
- Alessandro Del Monte (1616–1628 Died)
- Pietro Carpegna (1628–1630 Died)
- Ulderico Carpegna (1630–1638), elevated to Cardinal in 1633
- Orazio Monaldi (1639–1643)
- Alessandro Sperelli, C.O. (1644–1672)
- Carlo Vincenzo Toti (1672–1690)
- Sebastiano Pompilio Bonaventura (1690–1706)
- Fabio Mancinforte (1707–1725 Resigned)
- Sostegno Maria Cavalli, O.S.M. (1725–1747 Died)
- Giacomo Cingari (1747–1768)
- Paolo Orefici (1768–1784)
- Ottavio Angelelli (1785–1809 Died)

=== since 1800 ===
- Mario Ancaiani (1814–1821)
- Vincenzo Massi (1821–1839 Resigned)
- Cardinal Giuseppe Pecci (1841–1855)
- Innocenzo Sannibale (1855–1891 Died)
- Luigi Lazzareschi (1891–1895 Resigned)
- Macario Sorini (1895–1900 Resigned)
- Angelo Maria Dolci (1900–1906)
- Giovanni Battista Nasalli Rocca di Corneliano (1907–1916)
- Carlo Taccetti (1917–1920 Died)
- Pio Leonardo Navarra, O.F.M. Conv. (1920–1932)
- Beniamino Ubaldi (1932–1965 Died)
- Cesare Pagani (1972–1981)
- Ennio Antonelli (1982–1988)
- Pietro Bottaccioli (1989–2004 Retired)
- Mario Ceccobelli (2004–2017)
- Luciano Paolucci Bedini (2017– )

== Other priest of this diocese who became bishop ==
- Giorgio Barbetta, appointed Auxiliary Bishop of Huari, Peru in 2019

== Books ==
=== Reference works for bishops ===
- Gams, Pius Bonifatius (1873). Series episcoporum Ecclesiae catholicae: quotquot innotuerunt a beato Petro apostolo (in Latin). Ratisbon: Typis et Sumptibus Georgii Josephi Manz. pp. 699–700.
- Eubel, Conradus, ed. (1913). Hierarchia catholica (in Latin). Vol. Tomus 1 (second ed.). Münster: Libreria Regensbergiana. (in Latin)
- Eubel, Conradus, ed. (1914). Hierarchia catholica (in Latin). Vol. Tomus 2 (second ed.). Münster: Libreria Regensbergiana.
- Gulik, Guilelmus (1923). Eubel, Conradus (ed.). Hierarchia catholica (in Latin). Vol. Tomus 3 (second ed.). Münster: Libreria Regensbergiana.
- Gauchat, Patritius (Patrice) (1935). Hierarchia catholica. Vol. Tomus IV (1592-1667). Münster: Libraria Regensbergiana.
- Ritzler, Remigius; Sefrin, Pirminus (1952). Hierarchia catholica medii et recentis aevi. Vol. Tomus V (1667-1730). Patavii: Messagero di S. Antonio.
- Ritzler, Remigius; Sefrin, Pirminus (1958). Hierarchia catholica medii et recentis aevi. Vol. Tomus VI (1730-1799). Patavii: Messagero di S. Antonio.
- Ritzler, Remigius; Sefrin, Pirminus (1968). Hierarchia Catholica medii et recentioris aevi (in Latin). Vol. VII (1800–1846). Monasterii: Libreria Regensburgiana.
- Remigius Ritzler; Pirminus Sefrin (1978). Hierarchia catholica Medii et recentioris aevi (in Latin). Vol. VIII (1846–1903). Il Messaggero di S. Antonio.
- Pięta, Zenon (2002). Hierarchia catholica medii et recentioris aevi (in Latin). Vol. IX (1903–1922). Padua: Messagero di San Antonio. ISBN 978-88-250-1000-8.

=== Studies ===
- Cappelletti, Giuseppe (1846). Le chiese d'Italia (in Italian). Vol. quinto (5). Venezia: G. Antonelli. pp. 355–458.
- Colasanti, Arduino (1905). Gubbio (in Italian). Bergamo: Istituto italiano d'arti grafiche.
- Guerriero da Gubbio (1902). Giuseppe Mazzatinti (ed.). Cronaca di Ser Guerriero da Gubbio. Raccolta degli storici italiani dal cinquencento al millecinquecento, XXI. 4 (in Italian). Citta di Castello: S. Lapi. [Chronological index, pp. 187–213, covering c. 1350–1579]
- Kehr, Paul Fridolin (1909). Italia pontificia Vol. IV (Berlin: Weidmann 1909), pp. 81–97. (in Latin)
- Lanzoni, Francesco (1927). Le diocesi d'Italia dalle origini al principio del secolo VII (an. 604). Faenza: F. Lega, pp. 479–482. (in Italian)
- Lucarelli, Oderigi (1888). Memorie e guida storica di Gubbio (in Italian). Citta di Castello: S. Lapi.
- McCracken, Laura (1905). Gubbio, Past & Present. London: D. Nutt.
- Bernio, Guernerio (1732). Muratori, Lodovico Antonio (ed.). Chronicon Eugubinum. Rerum Italicarum scriptores, XXI (in Italian). Vol. Tomus vigesimusprimus (21). ex typographia Societatis palatinae. pp. 921–1024. [covers the years 1350–1472]
- Sarti, Mauro (1755). De episcopis Eugubinis (in Latin). Pesauro: Gavellia.
- Schwartz, Gerhard (1907). Die Besetzung der Bistümer Reichsitaliens unter den sächsischen und salischen Kaisern: mit den Listen der Bischöfe, 951-1122. Leipzig: B.G. Teubner. pp. 244–247. (in German)
- Ughelli, Ferdinando; Coleti, Niccolò (1717). Italia sacra, sive De Episcopis Italiae (in Latin). Vol. Tomus primus (secunda ed.). Venice: apud Sebastianum Coleti. pp. 632–655.
