= Bonfatti =

Bonfatti is an Italian surname. Notable people with the surname include:

- Antonio Bonfatti (born 1950), Argentine physician and politician
- Liliana Bonfatti (born 1930), Italian film actress
- Teresita dei Bonfatti (1869–1948), Italian activist and journalist known by her pseudonym Alma Dolens
