= Roman Catholic Diocese of Sansepolcro =

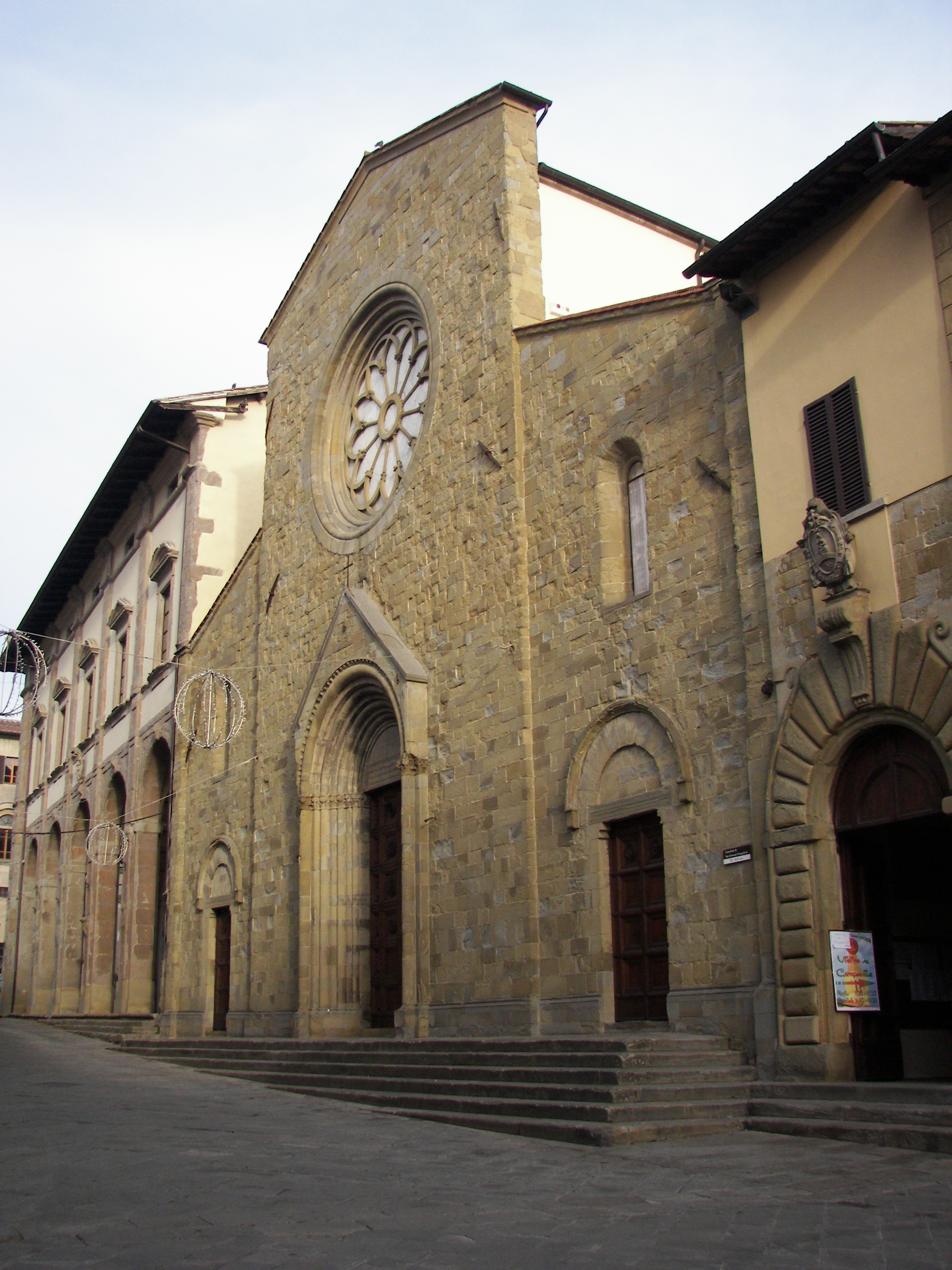
Duomo of Sansepolcro (11th century)

The Roman Catholic diocese of Sansepolcro was a Latin rite see in Tuscany, central Italy. It was erected in 1515, as the Diocese of (Borgo) Sansepolcro (Italian), though difficulties prevented the appointment of a bishop until 1520. On 30 September 1986, the diocese was suppressed and united with the Diocese of Arezzo and the Diocese of Cortona to form the Diocese of Arezzo-Cortona-Sansepolcro.

The diocese has always been a suffragan of the archbishop of Florence.

== History ==
The ecclesiastical entity was established in 1013 as Benedictine monastery of S. Giovanni Evangelista di San Sepolcro, on canonical territory within the Diocese of Città di Castello. In May 1046, Pope Gregory VI removed the monastery from the jurisdiction of the bishop of Arezzo. On 18 January 1106, Pope Paschal II granted the monastery the privilege of baptisms in the Borgo, and confirmed the right to hold an annual fair in the Borgo, and the right to the tithe of the monastery's properties. The Camaldolese monks, coming from their house in Arezzo, first appear in documents relating to the abbey of San Sepolcro on 11 January 1137. In 1148, Pope Eugenius III confirmed the monastery's privileges, and granted the abbot the use of the mitre, staff, and other pontifical vestments. In 1163, the Imperial Archchancellor, Archbishop Raynaldus of Cologne, promulgated an imperial decree of the Emperor Frederick Barbarossa, forbidding the Camaldolese from having any authority to depose and deprive an abbot of San Sepolcro, without the license and permission of the emperor.

From 1350 to 1353, Borgo San Sepolcro was occupied by Ghibelline troops of the ambitious Archbishop Visconti of Milan, who was attempting to seize all of Tuscany and Umbria, with the help of local Ghibelline adherents, the Boccagnini, the Pallavicini and the Tarlati of Arezzo. On the withdrawal of the Milanese forces after the Peace of Sarzana in 1353, a civil war broke out between Guelphs and Ghibellines, between Borgo San Sepolcro and Città di Castello.

On 25 December 1352, a major earthquake struck the areas of Borgo San Sepolcro and Città di Castello, causing more than 500 deaths in Borgo. The bell tower of the monastery was destroyed, and there was major damage to the buildings of the cloister. Many sections of the town wall were thrown down.

=== Creation of the diocese ===
On 22 September 1515, Pope Leo X issued a bull which erected the Camaldolese monastery church of S. Giovanni into a cathedral, creating Abbot Galeazzo, who had consented to the suppression of his monastery, the first bishop of Borgo San Sepolcro. The bull was not put into effect immediately, however, due to various difficulties. It was not until 18 September 1520 that Graziani was preconised and obtained his bulls of institution. At the same time the prelature gained territories from the Diocese of Arezzo and Diocese of Città di Castello.

In the same bull of 1515, "Praeexcellenti praeeminentia", Pope Leo created the Chapter of Canons of the cathedral, composed of three dignities (the Provost, the Archdeacon, and the Archpriest) and nine other Canons. The cathedral was also a parish church, and the Archpriest had the "cure of souls" (i.e. served as pastor).

On 7 October 1975, the diocese lost territories to the Diocese of Cesena and Diocese of Forli.

=== Suppression of the diocese ===
diocese of Arezzo-Cortona-Sansepolcro

On 18 February 1984, the Vatican and the Italian State signed a new and revised concordat. Based on the revisions, a set of Normae was issued on 15 November 1984, which was accompanied in the next year, on 3 June 1985, by enabling legislation. According to the agreement, the practice of having one bishop govern two separate dioceses at the same time, aeque personaliter, was abolished. Instead, the Vatican continued consultations which had begun under Pope John XXIII for the merging of small dioceses, especially those with personnel and financial problems, into one combined diocese. In Tuscany, this particularly affected three dioceses: Arezzo, Cortona, and Borgo San Sepolcro (Biturgensis).

On 30 September 1986, Pope John Paul II ordered that the dioceses of Arezzo, Cortona, and San Sepolcro be merged into one diocese with one bishop, with the Latin title Dioecesis Arretina-Cortonensis-Biturgensis. The seat of the diocese was to be in Arezzo, and the cathedral of Arezzo was to serve as the cathedral of the merged diocese. The cathedrals in Cortona and San Sepolcro were to become co-cathedrals, and their cathedral Chapters were to be a Capitulum Concathedralis. There was to be only one diocesan Tribunal, in Arezzo, and likewise one seminary, one College of Consultors, and one Priests' Council. The territory of the new diocese was to include the territory of the former dioceses of Cortona and Borgo San Sepolcro.

== Abbots of San Sepolcro ==
- Roderigo (attested 1013)

...

- Rodolfo (attested 1082)

...

- Giraldo (attested 1106)

...

- Tebaldo (attested 1160)
- Franciano (attested 1163)
- Philippus (attested 1180)
- Pagano (attested 1187)
- Pietro (attested 1203, 1207)
- Graziano (attested 1220, 1223)
- Omodeo (attested 1227, 1232, 1236, 1250, 1251, 1253)
- Pietro Monaco (attested 1259)
- Braimano (attested 1266)
- Pietro (deposed 1279)
- Zeno (attested 1279)
- Pietro (attested 1293)

...

- Giovanni (d. 1326)
- Angelo (1326–1338)

...

- Bartolomeo (attested 1357)
- Joannes (attested 1363)
- Bartolomeo (attested 1377, 1394)

...

- Pietro (attested 1419)
- Gregorius (attested 1425)
- Paschasius
- Girolamo Grifoni (attested 1463, 1478 1480)
- Simone Graziani (1480–1510)
- Galeazzo Graziani (1510–1520)

== Bishops of Sansepolcro ==
- Galeotto Graziani, O. Camald. (1520 – death? 1522)
- Leonardo Tornabuoni (1522–1539)
- Filippo Archinto (1539–1546)
- Alfonso Tornabuoni (1546–1557)
- Filippo Tornabuoni (1557–1559)
- Niccolò Tornabuoni (1560–1598)
- Alessandro Borghi (bishop) (1598–1605)
- Girolamo Incontri (1605–1615 Resigned)
- Giovanni dei Gualtieri (1615–1619)
- Filippo Salviati (1619–1634)
- Zanobi de' Medici, O.P. (1634–1637)
- Dionisio Bussotti, O.S.M. (1638–1654)
- Cherubino Malaspina, O.P. (1655–1667)
- Giovanni Carlo Baldovinetti, O.P. (1667–1671)
- Lodovico Malaspina, O. Carm. (1672–1695)
- Gregorio Compagni, O.P. (1696–1703)
- Giovanni Lorenzo Tilli (1704–1724)
- Bartolomeo Pucci (1724–1728)
- Raimondo Pecchioli, O.P. (1728–1748)
- Domenico Poltri (1749–1755)
- Adeodato Andrea Bivignano (1757–1770)
- Niccolò Marcacci (1771–1778)
- Roberto Costaguti (1778–1818)
- Annibale Tommasi (1820–1845)

Sede vacante (1845–1849)

- Giuseppe Singlau (1849–1867)
- Luigi Biscioni (Bisconi) Amadori (1872–1875)
- Giustino Puletti (1875.09.23 –1892.02.21)
- Raffaele Sandrelli (1892–1911)
- Pompeo Ghezzi (1911–1953)

Emilio Biancheri (1949–1953) Apostolic Administrator sede plena

- Domenico Bornigia (1953–1963)
- Abele Conigli (1963–1967)

Telesforo Giovanni Cioli, O. Carm. (1967–1975) Apostolic Administrator

- Telesforo Giovanni Cioli, O. Carm. (1975–1983)
- Giovanni D'Ascenzi (1983–1986)

== See also ==
- List of Catholic dioceses in Italy

== Sources ==
=== Episcopal lists ===
- Gams, Pius Bonifatius (1873). Series episcoporum Ecclesiae catholicae: quotquot innotuerunt a beato Petro apostolo (in Latin). Ratisbon: Typis et Sumptibus Georgii Josephi Manz. pp. 751–752.
- Gulik, Guilelmus (1923). Eubel, Conradus (ed.). Hierarchia catholica (in Latin). Vol. Tomus 3 (second ed.). Münster: Libreria Regensbergiana.
- Gauchat, Patritius (Patrice) (1935). Hierarchia catholica. Vol. Tomus IV (1592-1667). Münster: Libraria Regensbergiana.
- Ritzler, Remigius; Sefrin, Pirminus (1952). Hierarchia catholica medii et recentis aevi. Vol. Tomus V (1667-1730). Patavii: Messagero di S. Antonio.
- Ritzler, Remigius; Sefrin, Pirminus (1958). Hierarchia catholica medii et recentis aevi. Vol. Tomus VI (1730-1799). Patavii: Messagero di S. Antonio.
- Ritzler, Remigius; Sefrin, Pirminus (1968). Hierarchia Catholica medii et recentioris aevi (in Latin). Vol. VII (1800–1846). Monasterii: Libreria Regensburgiana.
- Remigius Ritzler; Pirminus Sefrin (1978). Hierarchia catholica Medii et recentioris aevi (in Latin). Vol. VIII (1846–1903). Il Messaggero di S. Antonio.
- Pięta, Zenon (2002). Hierarchia catholica medii et recentioris aevi (in Latin). Vol. IX (1903–1922). Padua: Messagero di San Antonio. ISBN 978-88-250-1000-8.

=== Studies ===
- Agnoletti, Ercole. I Vescovi di Sansepolcro 4 vols, Sansepolcro: Tipografia Boncompagni 1972–1975. (in Italian)
- Banker, James R. (2003). The Culture of San Sepolcro During the Youth of Piero Della Francesca. Ann Arb or: University of Michigan Press. pp. 24–56. ISBN 0-472-11301-1.
- Bassetti, M.; Czortek, A.; Menestò, E. (editors) (2013). Una Gerusalemme sul Tevere. L’abbazia e il Burgus Sancti Sepulcri (secoli X-XV). Atti del convegno (Sansepolcro 2012). Spoleto: Centro ISAM, 2013. (in Italian)
- Czortek, A. (2013). "I monaci e gli altri. Abati, vescovi, comune e Ordini religiosi a Sansepolcro nel secoli XIII-XIV," in: Una Gerusalemme sul Tevere. L’abbazia e il Burgus Sancti Sepulcri (secoli X-XV) (Spoleto 2013), pp. 183–249. (in Italian)
- Cappelletti, Giuseppe (1862). Le chiese d'Italia dalla loro origine sino ai nostri giorni (in Italian). Vol. decimosettimo. Venezia: Antonelli. pp. 249–273.
- Graziani, Antonio Maria (1745). De scriptis invita Minerva ... libri XX ... (in Latin). Vol. I. Florence: ex typogr. ad insigne Apollinis in Platea Magni Ducis.
- Kehr, Paul Fridolin (1909). Italia pontificia Vol. IV (Berlin: Weidmann 1909), pp. 108–110. (in Latin)
- Muzi, Giovanni (1843). Memorie ecclesiastiche e civili di Città di Castello (in Italian). Vol. quarto. Citta di Castello: presso Francesco Donati. pp. 63–110.
- Ricci, I., L'Abbazia camaldolese e la cattedrale di Sansepolcro. Sansepolcro 1942. (in Italian)
- Ughelli, Ferdinando; Coleti, Nicolo (1718). Italia sacra sive de Episcopis Italiae, et insularum adjacentium (in Latin). Vol. Tomus tertius (secunda ed.). Venice: Apud Sebastianum Coleti. pp. 195–203.

=== External links ===
- GCatholic.org
- "Borgo San-Sepolcro", in Catholic Encyclopedia
