= Sansepolcro Altarpiece =

16th-century painting by Perugino

Ascension of Christ
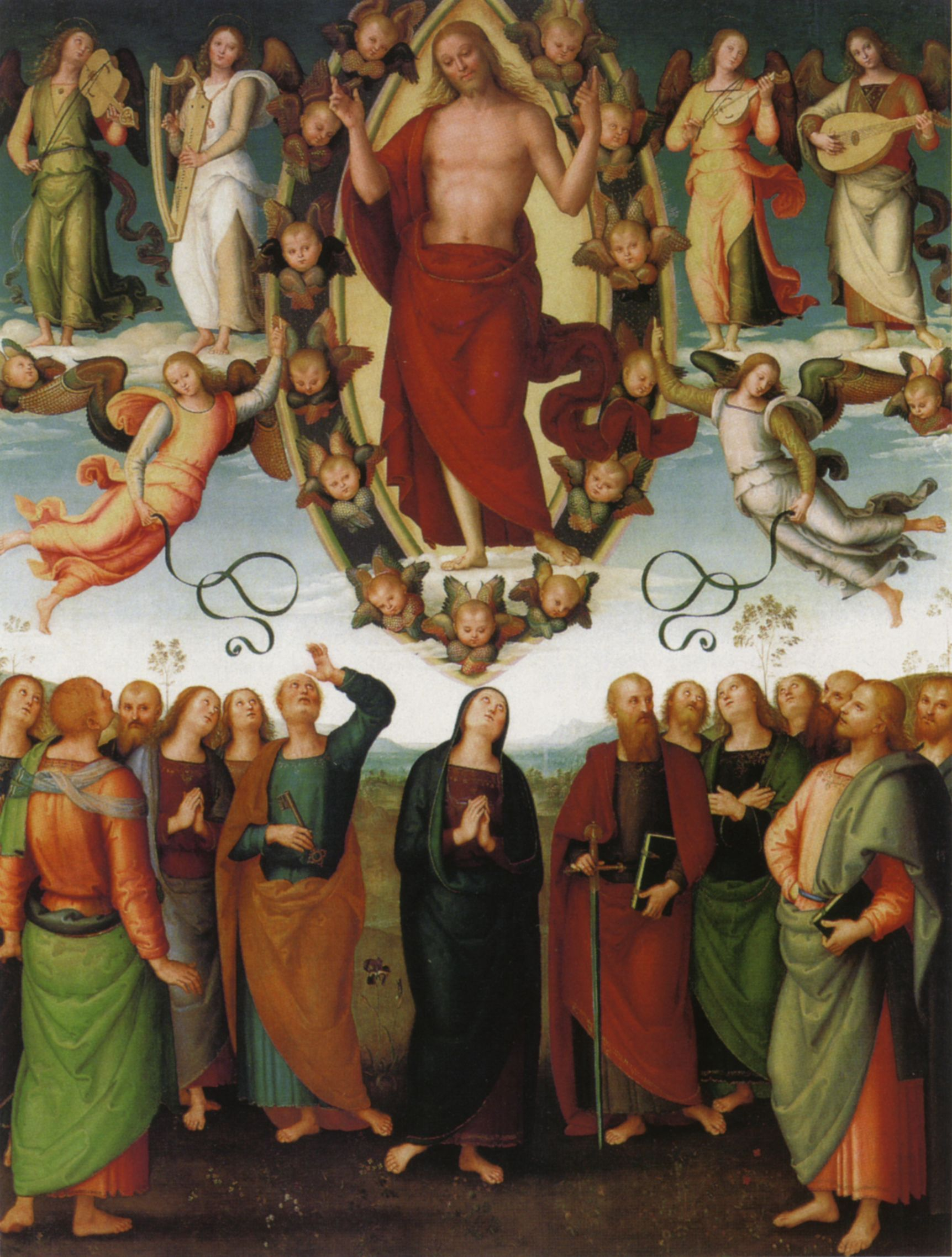
- Artist: Perugino
- Year: c. 1510
- Medium: Oil on panel
- Dimensions: 332.5 cm × 266 cm (130.9 in × 105 in)
- Location: Sansepolcro Cathedral

The Ascension of Christ (also known as Sansepolcro Altarpiece; Italian: Pala di Sansepolcro) is an oil painting on panel by Italian Renaissance master Perugino, dating from around 1510. It is housed in the Cathedral of Sansepolcro, Tuscany, Italy.

== Description ==
The works adopts the same composition in the central panel of Perugino's San Pietro Polyptych. However, because of its greater size, he enhanced some decorative details, such as the ribbons held by the angels. The work also saw a massive collaboration of the artist's workshop.

Christ is portrayed within a mandorla hovering at the top center of the panel, surrounded by flying or playing angels, while the frame has heads of cherubim and seraphims. The lower group includes Mary and the Apostles, with an Umbrian landscape in the background, characterized by slender trees.

== Sources ==
- Garibaldi, Vittoria (2007). "Perugino". Pittori del Rinascimento. Florence: Scala. ISBN 978-8881170999.
