= Ottavio Corsini =

Most Reverend Ottavio Corsini
- Titular Archbishop of Tarsus
- Church: Catholic Church
- In office: 1621–1641
- Predecessor: Henri Boivin de Péricard
- Successor: Carlo Rossetti
- Previous post: Apostolic Nuncio to France (1621–1623)

Orders
- Consecration: 21 March 1621 by Ottavio Bandini

Personal details
- Born: 12 August 1588 Florence, Italy
- Died: 30 July 1641 (age 52) Rome, Italy

Ottavio Corsini (12 August 1588 – 30 July 1641) was a Roman Catholic prelate who served as Titular Archbishop of Tarsus (1621–1641) and Apostolic Nuncio to France (1621–1623).

== Biography ==
Ottavio Corsini was born in Florence, Italy on 12 August 1588. On 17 March 1621, he was appointed during the papacy of Pope Gregory XV as Titular Archbishop of Tarsus.

On 21 March 1621, he was consecrated bishop by Ottavio Bandini, Cardinal-Priest of San Lorenzo in Lucina, with Ulpiano Volpi, Bishop of Novara, and Innocenzo Massimi, Bishop of Bertinoro, serving as co-consecrators.

On 4 April 1621, he was appointed during the papacy of Pope Gregory XV as Apostolic Nuncio to France, a position he held until his resignation on 30 December 1623 He served as Titular Archbishop of Tarsus until his death on 30 July 1641.

== Episcopal succession ==
While bishop, he was the principal co-consecrator of:

- Stefano Durazzo, Archbishop of Genoa (1635);
- Diego Requeséns, Titular Archbishop of Cartagine (1637); and
- Prospero Spínola, Bishop of Luni e Sarzana (1637),

Catholic Church titles
Preceded by Guido Bentivoglio	Apostolic Nuncio to France; 1621–1623	Succeeded by Bernardino Spada
Preceded by Henri Boivin de Péricard	Titular Archbishop of Tarsus; 1621–1641	Succeeded by Carlo Rossetti
