= Giandomenico Spinola =

Italian archbishop and cardinal

Giandomenico Spinola (1580 – 11 August 1646) (also Giovanni Domenico Spinola) was an Italian cardinal.

== Early life ==
Spinola was born in 1580 in Genoa. Though few records exist detailing his family background or education, he is listed as Questore (commissioner) of the Pontifical Office of the Treasury in his home town during the reign of Pope Paul V.

== Ecclesiastic career ==
Later Spinola moved to Rome where, under the guidance of Archbishop of Genoa, Antonmaria Sauli, he was appointed to a number of administrative church positions.

Spinola was sent to the Archdiocese of Messina to act as administrator in 1625. Upon his return to Rome in 1626, he was elevated to the office of cardinal, with the Basilica of San Clemente as his titular church. He was also named as Protector of his homeland, the Republic of Genoa, becoming its official representative to the Holy See.

In 1629 Spinola was also given the title of Cardinal Priest of the Church of Santa Cecilia in Trastevere, holding both until he gave up that of San Clemente on 17 August 1637. In November 1630 he was named the Archbishop of Acerenza and Matera. He was consecrated bishop by Domenico de' Marini, Archbishop of Genoa, with Angelo Mascardi, Bishop of Noli, Pietro Francesco Costa, Bishop of Albenga, and Vincenzo Giovanni Spínola, Bishop of Brugnato, serving as co-consecrators. He was transferred to the episcopal see of Luni-Sarzana on 26 April 1632, retaining the personal rank of archbishop. He was again transferred, this time to the Diocese of Mazara del Vallo in Sicily as of 1 December 1636, still retaining the rank of archbishop.

Between 1642 and 1643 Spinola also served as Camerlengo of the Sacred College of Cardinals. He participated in the papal conclave of 1644 that elected Pope Innocent X.

Spinola died in Mazara in 1646, and was buried in the Chapel of San Gaetano in the Cathedral of Mazara.

He was the uncle of Cardinal Giambattista Spinola and part of a line of Spinola cardinals.

Catholic Church titles
Preceded by Desiderio Scaglia	Cardinal-Priest of San Clemente; 1626–1629	Succeeded by Marcantonio Franciotti
Preceded by Federico Baldissera Bartolomeo Cornaro	Cardinal-Priest of Santa Cecilia; 1629–1637	Succeeded by Michel Mazarin
Preceded by Fabrizio Antinori	Archbishop of Acerenza e Matera; 1630–1632	Succeeded by Simone Carafa Roccella
Preceded by Giovanni Battista Salvago	Archbishop (Personal Title) of Luni e Sarzana; 1632–1636	Succeeded by Prospero Spínola
Preceded by Francisco Sánchez Villanueva y Vega	Archbishop (Personal Title) of Mazara del Vallo; 1636–1646	Succeeded by Diego Requeséns
Preceded by Desiderio Scaglia	Cardinal-Priest of San Clemente; 1637–1646	Succeeded by Marcantonio Franciotti
