= Gessi =

Gessi is an Italian surname. Notable people with this name include the following:

- Berlinghiero Gessi (1563 – 1639), an Italian Catholic Cardinal
- Francesco Gessi (1588 – 1649), Italian painter of the Baroque period
- Romolo Gessi (1831 –1881), an Italian soldier, governor in the Turkish-Egyptian administration and explorer of north-east Africa

== See also ==
- Gesso, paint mixture
- Geas, taboo
