= Cipriano Pallavicino =

Roman Catholic prelate

Most Reverend Cipriano Pallavicino
- Archbishop of Genoa
- Church: Catholic Church
- In office: 1568–1585
- Predecessor: Agostino Maria Salvago
- Successor: Antonmaria Sauli
- Previous post: Apostolic Nuncio to Naples (1566)

Orders
- Consecration: 12 March 1568 by Egidio Valenti

Personal details
- Born: 1509 Genoa, Italy
- Died: 13 November 1585 (age 76) Genoa, Italy

Cipriano Pallavicino (1509–1585) was a Roman Catholic prelate who served as Archbishop of Genoa (1568–1585) and Apostolic Nuncio to Naples (1566).

== Biography ==
Cipriano Pallavicino was born in Genoa, Italy in 1509. On 15 May 1566, he was appointed during the papacy of Pope Pius V as Apostolic Nuncio to Naples; he resigned from the position later in the same year in December 1566. On 12 March 1568, he was consecrated bishop by Egidio Valenti, Bishop of Nepi e Sutri, with Francesco Maria Piccolomini, Bishop of Pienza, and Girolamo Garimberti, Bishop Emeritus of Gallese, serving as co-consecrators. On 14 November 1567, he was appointed during the papacy of Pope Pius V as Archbishop of Genoa. He served as Archbishop of Genoa until his death on 13 November 1585.

== External links and additional sources ==
- Cheney, David M. "Nunciature to Naples". Catholic-Hierarchy.org. (for Chronology of Bishops) ^{[self-published]}
- Cheney, David M. "Archdiocese of Genova {Genoa}". Catholic-Hierarchy.org. (for Chronology of Bishops) ^{[self-published]}
- Chow, Gabriel. "Metropolitan Archdiocese of Genova (Italy)". GCatholic.org. (for Chronology of Bishops) ^{[self-published]}

Catholic Church titles
Preceded by Antonio Scarampi	Apostolic Nuncio to Naples; 1566	Succeeded by Paolo Odescalchi
Preceded by Agostino Maria Salvago	Archbishop of Genoa; 1568–1585	Succeeded by Antonmaria Sauli
