= Domenico de' Marini (patriarch) =

Italian Roman Catholic prelate (died 1635)

Most Reverend Domenico de' Marini
- Titular Patriarch of Jerusalem; Archbishop of Genoa
- Church: Catholic Church
- In office: 1627–1635
- Predecessor: Alfonso Manzanedo de Quiñones
- Successor: Giovanni Battista Colonna
- Previous posts: Bishop of Albenga (1611–1616); Archbishop of Genoa (1616–1635)

Orders
- Consecration: 1 May 1611 by Marcello Crescenzi (bishop)

Personal details
- Died: February 1635 Genoa, Italy

Domenico de' Marini (died 1635) was a Roman Catholic prelate who served as Titular Patriarch of Jerusalem (1627–1635), Archbishop of Genoa (1616–1635), and Bishop of Albenga (1611–1616).

== Biography ==
On 11 April 1611, Domenico de' Marini was appointed during the papacy of Pope Paul V as Bishop of Albenga. On 1 May 1611, he was consecrated bishop by Marcello Crescenzi (bishop), Bishop of Assisi, with Virgilio Fiorenzi, Bishop of Nocera Umbra, and Luca Semproni, Bishop of Città di Castello, serving as co-consecrators. On 18 July 1616, he was appointed during the papacy of Pope Paul V as Archbishop of Genoa.On 15 November 1627, he was appointed during the papacy of Pope Urban VIII as Titular Patriarch of Jerusalem. He served as Titular Patriarch of Jerusalem until his death in February 1635.

While bishop, he was the principal consecrator of Giovanni Domenico Spinola, Archbishop of Acerenza e Matera (1630).

== External links and additional sources ==
- Cheney, David M. "Diocese of Albenga-Imperia". Catholic-Hierarchy.org. (for Chronology of Bishops) ^{[self-published]}
- Chow, Gabriel. "Diocese of Albenga-Imperia (Italy)". GCatholic.org. (for Chronology of Bishops) ^{[self-published]}
- Cheney, David M. "Archdiocese of Genova {Genoa}". Catholic-Hierarchy.org. (for Chronology of Bishops) ^{[self-published]}
- Chow, Gabriel. "Metropolitan Archdiocese of Genova (Italy)". GCatholic.org. (for Chronology of Bishops) ^{[self-published]}
- Cheney, David M. "Patriarchate of Jerusalem {Gerusalemme}". Catholic-Hierarchy.org. (for Chronology of Bishops) ^{[self-published]}
- Chow, Gabriel. "Patriarchal See of Jerusalem (Israel)". GCatholic.org. (for Chronology of Bishops) ^{[self-published]}

Catholic Church titles
Preceded by Luca Fieschi	Bishop of Albenga; 1611–1616	Succeeded by Vincenzo Landinelli
Preceded by Orazio Spínola	Archbishop of Genoa; 1616–1635	Succeeded by Stefano Durazzo
Preceded by Alfonso Manzanedo de Quiñones	Titular Patriarch of Jerusalem; 1627–1635	Succeeded by Giovanni Battista Colonna
