= Gerolamo Sauli =

Most Reverend Gerolamo Sauli
- Archbishop of Genoa
- Church: Catholic Church
- Archdiocese: Archdiocese of Genoa
- In office: 1550-1559
- Predecessor: Innocenzo Cibo
- Successor: Agostino Maria Salvago
- Previous post: Archbishop of Bari-Canosa (1540–1550)

Personal details
- Died: 1559 Rome, Italy

Gerolamo Sauli (died 1559) was a Roman Catholic prelate who served as Archbishop of Bari-Canosa (1540–1550) and Archbishop of Genoa (1550–1559).

== Biography ==
On 20 August 1540, Gerolamo Sauli was appointed during the papacy of Pope Paul III as Archbishop of Bari-Canosa. On 18 April 1550, he was appointed during the papacy of Pope Julius III as Archbishop of Genoa. He served as Archbishop of Genoa until his death in Rome in 1559.

== External links and additional sources ==
- Cheney, David M. "Archdiocese of Bari-Bitonto". Catholic-Hierarchy.org. (for Chronology of Bishops) ^{[self-published]}
- Chow, Gabriel. "Metropolitan Archdiocese of Bari–Bitonto (Italy)". GCatholic.org. (for Chronology of Bishops) ^{[self-published]}
- Cheney, David M. "Archdiocese of Genova {Genoa}". Catholic-Hierarchy.org. (for Chronology of Bishops) ^{[self-published]}
- Chow, Gabriel. "Metropolitan Archdiocese of Genova (Italy)". GCatholic.org. (for Chronology of Bishops) ^{[self-published]}

Catholic Church titles
Preceded by Girolamo Grimaldi	Archbishop of Bari-Canosa; 1540-1550	Succeeded by Giacomo Puteo
Preceded by Innocenzo Cibo	Archbishop of Genoa; 1550-1559	Succeeded by Agostino Maria Salvago
