= Giulio Vincenzo Gentile =

Most Reverend Giulio Vincenzo Gentile
- Archbishop of Genoa
- Church: Catholic Church
- Archdiocese: Archdiocese of Genoa
- In office: 1681–1694
- Predecessor: Giambattista Spínola
- Successor: Giovanni Battista Spínola (archbishop)

Orders
- Consecration: 23 March 1681 by Giacomo Franzoni

Personal details
- Born: 1620 Genoa, Italy
- Died: June 1694 (age 74) Genoa, Italy

Giulio Vincenzo Gentile, O.P. (1620–1694) was a Roman Catholic prelate who served as Archbishop of Genoa (1681–1694).

== Biography ==
Giulio Vincenzo Gentile was born in Genoa, Italy in 1620 and ordained a priest in the Order of Preachers. On 17 March 1681, he was appointed during the papacy of Pope Innocent XI as Archbishop of Genoa. On 23 March 1681, he was consecrated bishop by Giacomo Franzoni, Bishop of Camerino, with Niccolò Radulovich, Archbishop of Chieti, and Giacomo de Angelis, Archbishop Emeritus of Urbino, serving as co-consecrators. He served as Archbishop of Genoa until his death in June 1694.

== External links and additional sources ==
- Cheney, David M. "Archdiocese of Genova {Genoa}". Catholic-Hierarchy.org. (for Chronology of Bishops) ^{[self-published]}
- Chow, Gabriel. "Metropolitan Archdiocese of Genova (Italy)". GCatholic.org. (for Chronology of Bishops) ^{[self-published]}

Catholic Church titles
Preceded by Giambattista Spínola	Archbishop of Genoa; 1681–1694	Succeeded by Giovanni Battista Spínola (archbishop)
