= Giovanni Battista Spínola (archbishop of Genoa) =

Roman Catholic archbishop (1625 ca. -1705)

Most Reverend Giovanni Battista Spínola
- Church: Catholic Church
- Archdiocese: Archdiocese of Genoa
- In office: 1694–1705
- Predecessor: Giulio Vincenzo Gentile
- Successor: Lorenzo Maria Fieschi

Personal details
- Born: 1625 Genoa, Italy
- Died: 7 January 1705 (age 80)

Giovanni Battista Spínola (1625–1705) was a Roman Catholic prelate who served as Archbishop of Genoa (1694–1705) and Bishop of Luni e Sarzana (1665–1694).

== Biography ==
Giovanni Battista Spínola was born in Genoa, Italy in 1625. On 22 April 1665, he was appointed during the papacy of Pope Alexander VII as Bishop of Luni e Sarzana. On 13 September 1694, he was appointed during the papacy of Pope Innocent XII as Archbishop of Genoa. He served as Archbishop of Genoa until his death on 7 January 1705.

== External links and additional sources ==
- Cheney, David M. "Diocese of La Spezia-Sarzana-Brugnato". Catholic-Hierarchy.org. (for Chronology of Bishops) ^{[self-published]}
- Chow, Gabriel. "Titular Episcopal See of Luni (Italy)". GCatholic.org. (for Chronology of Bishops) ^{[self-published]}
- Cheney, David M. "Archdiocese of Genova {Genoa}". Catholic-Hierarchy.org. (for Chronology of Bishops) ^{[self-published]}
- Chow, Gabriel. "Metropolitan Archdiocese of Genova (Italy)". GCatholic.org. (for Chronology of Bishops) ^{[self-published]}

Catholic Church titles
Preceded by Prospero Spínola	Bishop of Luni e Sarzana; 1665–1694	Succeeded by Giovanni Girolamo Naselli
Preceded by Giulio Vincenzo Gentile	Archbishop of Genoa; 1694–1705	Succeeded by Lorenzo Maria Fieschi
