= Matteo Rivarola =

Roman Catholic prelate

Most Reverend Matteo Rivarola
- Archbishop of Genoa
- Church: Catholic Church
- Archdiocese: Archdiocese of Genoa
- In office: 1596–1600
- Predecessor: Alessandro Centurione
- Successor: Orazio Spínola

Orders
- Consecration: 3 May 1596 by Antonmaria Sauli

Personal details
- Died: 1600

Matteo Rivarola (died 1600) was a Roman Catholic prelate who served as Archbishop of Genoa (1596–1600).

== Biography ==
On 29 April 1596, he was appointed during the papacy of Pope Clement VIII as Archbishop of Genoa. On 3 May 1596, he was consecrated bishop by Antonmaria Sauli, Cardinal-Priest of Santo Stefano al Monte Celio. He served as Archbishop of Genoa until his death in 1600.

== External links and additional sources ==
- Cheney, David M. "Archdiocese of Genova {Genoa}". Catholic-Hierarchy.org. (for Chronology of Bishops) ^{[self-published]}
- Chow, Gabriel. "Metropolitan Archdiocese of Genova (Italy)". GCatholic.org. (for Chronology of Bishops) ^{[self-published]}

Catholic Church titles
Preceded by Alessandro Centurione	Archbishop of Genoa; 1596–1600	Succeeded by Orazio Spínola
