= Diego Sarmiento Valladares =

Spanish bishop and Grand Inquisitor

- Bishop of Plasencia
- Church: Catholic Church
- Diocese: Diocese of Plasencia
- In office: 17 September 1668 – 26 April 1677
- Predecessor: Diego Riquelme de Quirós
- Successor: Juan Lozano
- Previous post: Bishop of Oviedo (1668)

Orders
- Ordination: 4 October 1667
- Consecration: 27 May 1668 by Vitaliano Visconti

Personal details
- Born: Diego Sarmiento de Valladares; 1615 Vigo, Kingdom of Galicia, Crown of Castile
- Died: 29 January 1695 (aged 79–80) Madrid, Kingdom of Toledo, Crown of Castile

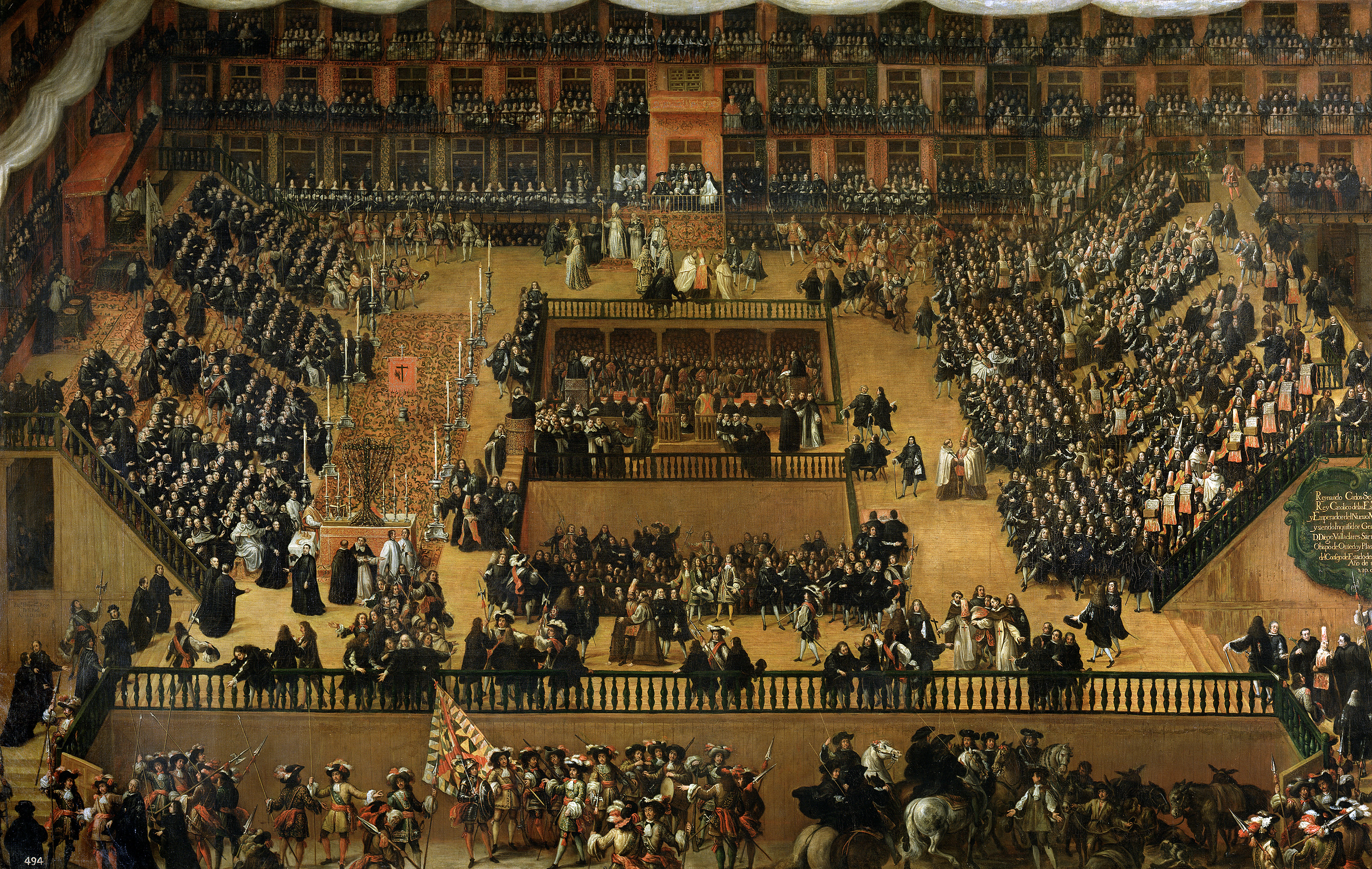
Diego Sarmiento de Valladares oversaw the auto-da-fé held in Plaza Mayor, Madrid in 1680, depicted here in a 1683 painting by Francisco Rizi.

Diego Sarmiento de Valladares (1615 – 29 January 1695) was a Spanish bishop who was Grand Inquisitor of Spain from 1669 to 1695.

== Biography ==
Diego Sarmiento de Valladares was born in Vigo in 1615, the son of Luis Sarmiento, señor de Valladares and Inés de Arines Romay, señora de Camos. He was closely related to Jose Sarmiento de Valladares y Arines Romay, 1st Duke of Atrisco and Viceroy of New Spain.

Valladares was ordained as a priest on 4 October 1667. He was appointed Bishop of Oviedo on 30 January 1668. He was translated on 17 September 1668, becoming Bishop of Plasencia. Charles II of Spain also named him president of the Council of Castile at this time, and he held that post until 1669. In 1669, he became Grand Inquisitor of Spain. He resigned his bishopric on 26 April 1677 but remained Grand Inquisitor until his death. In this capacity, he oversaw one of the Spanish Inquisition's largest auto-da-fés of the seventeenth century, held in the Plaza Mayor, Madrid in 1680.

Valladares died in Madrid on 29 January 1695.

== External links and additional sources ==
- Cheney, David M. "Diocese of Plasencia". Catholic-Hierarchy.org. (for Chronology of Bishops) ^{[self-published]}
- Chow, Gabriel. "Diocese of Plasencia (Spain)". GCatholic.org. (for Chronology of Bishops) ^{[self-published]}

Catholic Church titles
Preceded by Juan Everardo Nithard	Grand Inquisitor of Spain; 1669–1695	Succeeded by Juan Tomás de Rocaberti
