= Agostino Maria Salvago =

Italian Roman Catholic prelate

Most Reverend Agostino Maria Salvago
- Archbishop of Genoa
- Church: Catholic Church
- In office: 1559–1567
- Predecessor: Girolamo Sauli
- Successor: Cipriano Pallavicino
- Previous post: Bishop of Accia (1553–1558)

Personal details
- Died: 30 September 1567 Genoa, Italy

Agostino Maria Salvago, O.P. (died 1567) was a Roman Catholic prelate who served as Archbishop of Genoa (1559–1567) and Bishop of Accia (1553–1558).

== Biography ==
Agostino Maria Salvago was ordained a priest in the Order of Preachers. On 18 August 1553, he was appointed during the papacy of Pope Julius III as Bishop of Accia; he resigned on 28 November 1558. On 17 April 1559, he was appointed during the papacy of Pope Paul IV as Archbishop of Genoa. He served as Archbishop of Genoa until his death on 30 September 1567.

While bishop, he was the principal consecrator of Cherubino Lavosio, Bishop of Telese o Cerreto Sannita (1566)

== External links and additional sources ==
- Cheney, David M. "Diocese of Accia and Mariana". Catholic-Hierarchy.org. (for Chronology of Bishops) ^{[self-published]}
- Chow, Gabriel. "Titular Episcopal See of Accia (Italy)". GCatholic.org. (for Chronology of Bishops) ^{[self-published]}
- Cheney, David M. "Archdiocese of Genova {Genoa}". Catholic-Hierarchy.org. (for Chronology of Bishops) ^{[self-published]}
- Chow, Gabriel. "Metropolitan Archdiocese of Genova (Italy)". GCatholic.org. (for Chronology of Bishops) ^{[self-published]}

Catholic Church titles
Preceded by Pierre de Affatatis	Bishop of Accia; 1553–1558	Succeeded by Giulio Soperchio
Preceded by Girolamo Sauli	Archbishop of Genoa; 1559–1567	Succeeded by Cipriano Pallavicino
