= Charles Impellizzeri =

Italian Catholic bishop (died 1656)

Most Reverend Charles Impellizzeri
- Bishop of Mazara del Vallo
- Church: Catholic Church
- Diocese: Diocese of Mazara del Vallo
- In office: 1650–1656
- Predecessor: Diego Requeséns
- Successor: Juan Lozano (bishop)

Orders
- Consecration: 8 January 1651

Personal details
- Died: 1656 Mazara del Vallo, Italy

Charles Impellizzeri (died 1656) was a Roman Catholic prelate who served as Bishop of Mazara del Vallo (1650–1656).

== Biography ==
On 19 December 1650, Charles Impellizzeri was appointed during the papacy of Pope Innocent X as Bishop of Mazara del Vallo. On 8 January 1651, he was consecrated bishop. He served as Bishop of Mazara del Vallo until his death on 1656.

== External links and additional sources ==
- Cheney, David M. "Diocese of Mazara del Vallo". Catholic-Hierarchy.org. (for Chronology of Bishops) ^{[self-published]}
- Chow, Gabriel. "Diocese of Mazara del Vallo (Italy)". GCatholic.org. (for Chronology of Bishops) ^{[self-published]}

Catholic Church titles
Preceded by Diego Requeséns	Bishop of Mazara del Vallo; 1650–1656	Succeeded by Juan Lozano (bishop)
