= Alessandro Centurione =

Roman Catholic prelate

Most Reverend Alessandro Centurione
- Archbishop of Genoa
- Church: Catholic Church
- Archdiocese: Archdiocese of Genoa
- In office: 1591–1596
- Predecessor: Antonmaria Sauli
- Successor: Matteo Rivarola

Personal details
- Born: Genoa, Italy
- Died: 1605 Ravenna, Italy

Alessandro Centurione (died 1605) was a Roman Catholic prelate who served as Archbishop of Genoa (1591–1596).

== Biography ==
Alessandro Centurione was born in Genoa, Italy. On 9 August 1591, he was appointed during the papacy of Pope Gregory XIV as Archbishop of Genoa. On 22 September 1591, he was consecrated bishop by Antonmaria Sauli, Cardinal-Priest of Santo Stefano al Monte Celio, with Domenico Grimaldi, Archbishop of Avignon, and Francesco Cornaro (iuniore), Bishop of Treviso, serving as co-consecrators. He served as Archbishop of Genoa until his resignation in 1596. He died in Ravenna, Italy in 1605.

While bishop, he was the principal co-consecrator of Archbishop Juan Santisteban de Falces, Archbishop of Brindisi (1605).

== External links and additional sources ==
- Cheney, David M. "Nunciature to Naples". Catholic-Hierarchy.org. (for Chronology of Bishops) ^{[self-published]}
- Cheney, David M. "Archdiocese of Genova {Genoa}". Catholic-Hierarchy.org. (for Chronology of Bishops) ^{[self-published]}
- Chow, Gabriel. "Metropolitan Archdiocese of Genova (Italy)". GCatholic.org. (for Chronology of Bishops) ^{[self-published]}

Catholic Church titles
| Preceded by Antonmaria Sauli | Archbishop of Genoa; 1591–1596 | Succeeded by Matteo Rivarola |
