= Prospero Spínola =

Italian Roman Catholic prelate

Most Reverend Prospero Spínola
- Bishop of Luni e Sarzana
- Church: Catholic Church
- Diocese: Diocese of Luni e Sarzana
- In office: 1637–1664
- Predecessor: Giovanni Domenico Spinola
- Successor: Giovanni Battista Spínola (archbishop)

Orders
- Consecration: 25 October 1637 by Bernardino Spada

Personal details
- Born: Genoa, Italy
- Died: 1664

Prospero Spínola (1587–1664) was a Roman Catholic prelate who served as Bishop of Luni e Sarzana (1637–1664).

== Biography ==
Prospero Spínola was born in 1587 in Genoa, Italy. On 7 September 1637, he was appointed during the papacy of Pope Urban VIII as Bishop of Luni e Sarzana. On 25 October 1637, he was consecrated bishop by Bernardino Spada, Cardinal-Priest of Santo Stefano al Monte Celio, with Ottavio Corsini, Titular Archbishop of Tarsus, and Biagio Proto de Rossi, Archbishop of Messina, serving as co-consecrators. He served as Bishop of Luni e Sarzana until his death in 1664.

== External links and additional sources ==
- Cheney, David M. "Diocese of La Spezia-Sarzana-Brugnato". Catholic-Hierarchy.org. (for Chronology of Bishops) ^{[self-published]}
- Chow, Gabriel. "Titular Episcopal See of Luni (Italy)". GCatholic.org. (for Chronology of Bishops) ^{[self-published]}

Catholic Church titles
Preceded by Giovanni Domenico Spinola	Bishop of Luni e Sarzana; 1637–1664	Succeeded by Giovanni Battista Spínola (archbishop)
