= Juan Lozano (bishop) =

Roman Catholic prelate

Most Reverend Juan Lozano
- Archbishop (Personal Title) of Plasencia
- Church: Catholic Church
- Diocese: Diocese of Plasencia
- In office: 1677–1679
- Predecessor: Diego Sarmiento Valladares
- Successor: Juan Álvarez Osorio
- Previous posts: Bishop of Tropea (1646–1656); Bishop of Mazara del Vallo (1656–1669); Archbishop of Palermo (1669–1677)

Personal details
- Born: April 1610 Jumilla, Spain
- Died: 3 July 1679 (age 69) Plasencia, Spain

Juan Lozano, O.E.S.A. (April, 1610 – 3 July 1679) was a Roman Catholic prelate who served as Archbishop (Personal Title) of Plasencia (1677–1679), Archbishop of Palermo (1669–1677), Bishop of Mazara del Vallo (1656–1669), and Bishop of Tropea (1646–1656).

== Biography ==
Juan Lozano was born in Jumilla, Spain in April 1610 and ordained a priest in the Order of Saint Augustine. On 27 August 1646, he was selected by the King of Spain and confirmed by Pope Innocent X on 17 December 1646 as Bishop of Tropea. On 23 July 1655, he was selected by the King of Spain and confirmed by Pope Alexander VI on 29 May 1656 as Bishop of Mazara del Vallo. On 4 February 1669, he was appointed during the papacy of Pope Clement IX as Archbishop of Palermo. On 26 April 1677, he was appointed during the papacy of Pope Innocent XI as Archbishop (Personal Title) of Plasencia. He served as Archbishop of Plasencia until his death on 3 July 1679.

== External links and additional sources ==
- Cheney, David M. "Diocese of Tropea". Catholic-Hierarchy.org. (for Chronology of Bishops) ^{[self-published]}
- Chow, Gabriel. "Diocese of Tropea (Italy)". GCatholic.org. (for Chronology of Bishops) ^{[self-published]}
- Cheney, David M. "Diocese of Mazara del Vallo". Catholic-Hierarchy.org. (for Chronology of Bishops) ^{[self-published]}
- Chow, Gabriel. "Diocese of Mazara del Vallo (Italy)". GCatholic.org. (for Chronology of Bishops) ^{[self-published]}
- Cheney, David M. "Archdiocese of Palermo". Catholic-Hierarchy.org. (for Chronology of Bishops) ^{[self-published]}
- Chow, Gabriel. "Metropolitan Archdiocese of Palermo (Italy)". GCatholic.org. (for Chronology of Bishops) ^{[self-published]}
- Cheney, David M. "Diocese of Plasencia". Catholic-Hierarchy.org. (for Chronology of Bishops) ^{[self-published]}
- Chow, Gabriel. "Diocese of Plasencia (Spain)". GCatholic.org. (for Chronology of Bishops) ^{[self-published]}

Catholic Church titles
Preceded by Benedetto Mandina	Bishop of Tropea; 1646–1656	Succeeded by Carlo Maranta
Preceded by Charles Impellizzeri	Bishop of Mazara del Vallo; 1656–1669	Succeeded by Giuseppe Cigala
Preceded by Pietro Jerónimo Martínez y Rubio	Archbishop of Palermo; 1669–1677	Succeeded by Jaime de Palafox y Cardona
Preceded by Diego Sarmiento Valladares	Archbishop (Personal Title) of Plasencia; 1677–1679	Succeeded by Juan Álvarez Osorio
