= Diego Requeséns =

17th-century Roman Catholic prelate

Most Reverend Diego Requeséns
- Archbishop (Personal Title) of Mazara del Vallo
- Church: Catholic Church
- Diocese: Diocese of Mazara del Vallo
- In office: 1647–1650
- Predecessor: Giovanni Domenico Spinola
- Successor: Charles Impellizzeri
- Previous post: Titular Archbishop of Cartagine (1637–1647)

Orders
- Consecration: 25 October 1637 by Bernardino Spada

Personal details
- Died: March 1650 Mazara del Vallo, Italy

Diego Requeséns (died 1650) was a Roman Catholic prelate who served as Archbishop (Personal Title) of Mazara del Vallo (1647–1650) and Titular Archbishop of Cartagine (1637–1647).

== Biography ==
On 7 September 1637, Diego Requeséns was appointed during the papacy of Pope Urban VIII as Titular Archbishop of Cartagine. On 25 October 1637, he was consecrated bishop by Bernardino Spada, Cardinal-Priest of Santo Stefano al Monte Celio, with Ottavio Corsini, Titular Archbishop of Tarsus, and Biago Proto de Rubeis, Archbishop of Messina, serving as co-consecrators. On 7 October 1647, he was appointed during the papacy of Pope Innocent X as Archbishop (Personal Title) of Mazara del Vallo. He served as Archbishop of Mazara del Vallo until his death in March 1650.

== Episcopal succession ==
While bishop, he was the principal co-consecrator of:

- Jerónimo Domín Funes, Bishop of Gaeta (1637);
- Pietro Corsetto, Bishop of Cefalù (1638); and
- Roberto Strozzi, Bishop of Colle di Val d'Elsa (1638).

== External links and additional sources ==
- Cheney, David M. "Diocese of Mazara del Vallo". Catholic-Hierarchy.org. (for Chronology of Bishops) ^{[self-published]}
- Chow, Gabriel. "Diocese of Mazara del Vallo (Italy)". GCatholic.org. (for Chronology of Bishops) ^{[self-published]}

Catholic Church titles
Preceded by	Titular Archbishop of Cartagine; 1637–1647	Succeeded by Scipione Costaguti
Preceded by Giovanni Domenico Spinola	Archbishop (Personal Title) of Mazara del Vallo; 1647–1650	Succeeded by Charles Impellizzeri
