= Giambattista Spínola Jr. =

Giambattista Spinola Jr. (August 4, 1646, Genoa – March 19, 1719, Rome) was the nephew of Giambattista Spinola (seniore) and like his uncle a Cardinal of the Roman Catholic Church.

He was the Titular Archbishop of Tebe. At various times he served as a papal legate in such places as Bologna.

He attended the papal conclave of 1700.

He is buried in the tomb of Cardinal Giulio Spinola, at the church of St Andrea al Quirinale in Rome.

== Sources ==
- short bios of Cardinals

Catholic Church titles
Preceded by Giovanni Francesco Negroni	Cardinal-Deacon of San Cesareo in Palatio; 1696–1719	Succeeded by Thomas Philip Wallrad de Hénin-Liétard d'Alsace
