= Saint Prisca =

Child martyr in Christianity

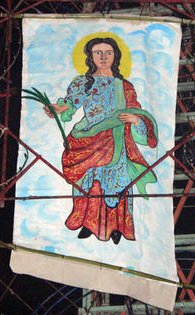
- Died: late 1st century
- Venerated in: Roman Catholic Church, Anglican Communion, Eastern Orthodox Church
- Major shrine: Santa Prisca
- Feast: January 18

Prisca was a young Roman woman tortured and executed for her Christian faith. The dates of her birth and death are unknown. She is revered as a saint and martyr in Eastern Orthodoxy, by the Catholic Church, and in the Anglican Communion.

Though some legends suggest otherwise, scholars do not believe she is the Priscilla (Prisca) of the New Testament couple Priscilla and Aquila, who were friends of the Apostle Paul.

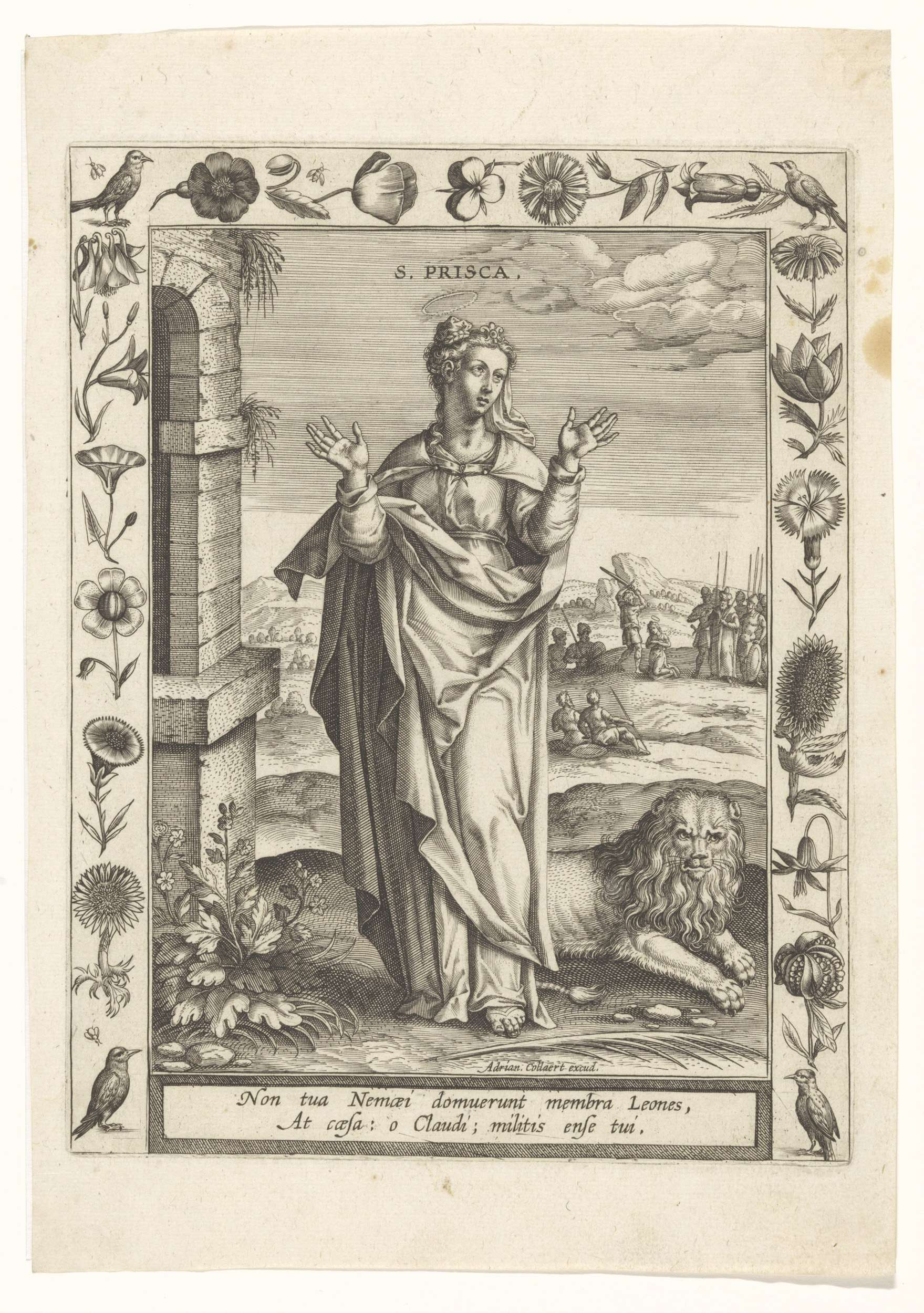
Saint Prisca and the lion, in a print by Adriaen Collaert, c. 1600

She is honored, especially in England, as a child martyr. January 18 is her feast day.

== Legend ==
Saint Prisca was of a noble family. At age thirteen, she was supposedly baptized by St. Peter. Emperor Claudius ordered her to make a sacrifice to the god Apollo. When she refused because of her Christian faith, she was beaten and sent to prison. She was at last thrown to a lion in the amphitheater, but it quietly lay down at her feet. The Italian poet Martha Marchina (1600–1646) describes this moment of Prisca's martyrdom in a pair of poems in her book Musa Posthuma, where the lion's humane nature is contrasted against human savagery.

She was starved for three days in a slaves' prison house, tortured upon the rack, and thrown on a burning pile. Still she remained alive, but was beheaded at the tenth milestone on the Via Ostiensis—the road from Rome to Ostia.

== Commentary ==
It is difficult to establish the true identity of this Roman martyr since the various information concerning her probably refers to three different people.

There exists on the Aventine a church of St. Prisca. It stands on the site of a very early title church, the Titulus Priscoe, mentioned in the fifth century and built probably in the fourth. In the eighteenth century there was found near this church a bronze tablet with an inscription of the year 224, by which a senator named Caius Marius Pudens Cornelianus was granted citizenship in a Spanish city. As such tablets were generally put up in the house of the person so honoured, it is possible that the senator's palace stood on the spot where the church was later built. The assumption is probable that the Prisca who founded this title church, or who, perhaps as early as the third century, gave the use of a part of the house standing there for the Christian church services, belonged to the family of Pudens Cornelianus.

The grave of a martyr Prisca was venerated in the Roman Catacomb of Priscilla on the Via Salaria. The place of interment is explicitly mentioned in all the seventh-century itineraries to the graves of the Roman martyrs. Whether the martyr buried in the Catacomb of Priscilla belonged to the same family or was identical with the founder of the title church cannot be proved. Still some family relationship is probable, because the name Priscilla appears also in the senatorial family of the Acilii Glabriones, whose burial-place was in the Catacomb of Priscilla on the Via Salaria. The Martyrologium Hieronymianum mentions under 18 January a martyr named Priscilla on the Via Salaria. This Priscilla is evidently identical with the Prisca whose grave was in the Catacomb of Priscilla and who is mentioned in the itineraries of the seventh century.

A legend from the eighth century has identified the founder of the Titulus Priscoe with St. Paul's friend Priscilla, whose home would have occupied the spot on which the church was later erected.

Another legend relates the martyrdom of a Prisca who was beheaded at the tenth milestone on the Via Ostiensis, and whose body Pope Eutychianus is said to have translated to the church of Prisca on the Aventine. The whole narrative is unhistorical and its details impossible. As 18 January is also assigned as the day of the execution of this Priscilla, she is probably the same as the Roman martyr buried in the Catacomb of Priscilla. Her feast is observed on 18 January.

The Acta S. Priscae, which places her martyrdom under Claudius II (268–270) and the burial on the Via Ostiense, from which his body would later be taken to the Aventine, has no more credibility than the legend, which places Prisca at the time of Peter in Rome.
