= Giovanni Girolamo Naselli =

Italian Roman Catholic prelate

Most Reverend Giovanni Girolamo Naselli
- Bishop of Luni e Sarzana
- Church: Catholic Church
- Diocese: Diocese of Luni e Sarzana
- In office: 1695–1709
- Predecessor: Giovanni Battista Spínola (archbishop)
- Successor: Ambrogio Spinola (bishop)
- Previous post: Bishop of Ventimiglia (1685–1695)

Orders
- Consecration: 23 September 1685 by Francesco Nerli (iuniore)

Personal details
- Born: 30 December 1640 Savona, Republic of Genoa
- Died: August 1709 (age 68)

Giovanni Girolamo Naselli (1640–1709) was a Roman Catholic prelate who served as Bishop of Luni e Sarzana (1695–1709) and Bishop of Ventimiglia (1685–1695).

== Biography ==
Giovanni Girolamo Naselli was born in Savona, then part of the Genoese Republic on 30 December 1640. On 10 September 1685, he was appointed during the papacy of Pope Innocent XI as Bishop of Ventimiglia. On 23 September 1685, he was consecrated bishop by Francesco Nerli (iuniore), Cardinal-Priest of San Matteo in Merulana. On 7 February 1695, he was appointed during the papacy of Pope Innocent XII as Bishop of Luni e Sarzana. He served as Bishop of Luni e Sarzana until his death in August 1709.

== External links and additional sources ==
- Cheney, David M. "Diocese of Ventimiglia-San Remo". Catholic-Hierarchy.org. (for Chronology of Bishops) ^{[self-published]}
- Chow, Gabriel. "Diocese of Ventimiglia-San Remo (Italy)". GCatholic.org. (for Chronology of Bishops) ^{[self-published]}
- Cheney, David M. "Diocese of La Spezia-Sarzana-Brugnato". Catholic-Hierarchy.org. (for Chronology of Bishops) ^{[self-published]}
- Chow, Gabriel. "Titular Episcopal See of Luni (Italy)". GCatholic.org. (for Chronology of Bishops) ^{[self-published]}

Catholic Church titles
Preceded by Mauro Promontorio	Bishop of Ventimiglia; 1685–1695	Succeeded by Giovanni Stefano Pastori
Preceded by Giovanni Battista Spínola (archbishop)	Bishop of Luni e Sarzana; 1695–1709	Succeeded by Ambrogio Spinola (bishop)
