= Giambattista Spinola =

His Eminence Giambattista Spinola
- Archbishop of Genoa
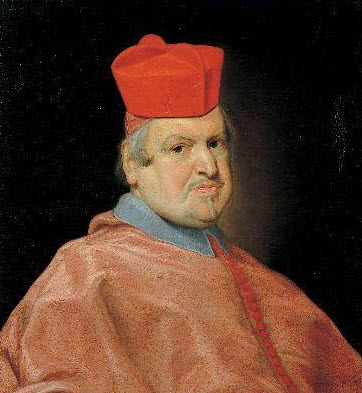
- Church: Catholic Church
- Archdiocese: Genoa
- Appointed: October 1664
- Term ended: 16 March 1681
- Predecessor: Stefano Durazzo
- Successor: Giulio Vincenzo Gentile
- Other posts: Cardinal-Priest of Santa Maria in Trastevere (1698–1704)
- Previous posts: Archbishop of Acerenza (1648–1664)

Orders
- Created cardinal: 1 September 1681 by Pope Innocent XI
- Rank: Cardinal-Priest

Personal details
- Born: Giambattista Spinola il Vecchio; 20 September 1615 Madrid, Spain
- Died: 4 January 1704 (aged 88) Rome, Papal States
- Buried: San Salvatore alle Coppelle
- Coat of arms

Giambattista Spinola (20 September 1615 – 4 January 1704) was a cardinal of the Catholic Church and an Archbishop of Genoa.

Giambattista was born in Madrid, Spain, the fourth of the twelve children of Luca Spinola and Battina Lomellini. They were immigrants from Genoa in Italy, members of the influential Spinola family of that city, which had long been active in Genoese politics. He was the nephew of Cardinal Giandomenico Spinola. He was also the uncle of Giambattista Spínola Jr.

During his career, he participated in three papal conclaves, the last being in 1700, when he was 85 years old.

Spinola studied law as a young man, receiving the degree of Doctor in utroque iure. At an unknown date he entered Church service. In 1648 he was appointed as archbishop of the Roman Catholic Archdiocese of Acerenza and Matera, while still a deacon. He became the Archbishop of Genoa in 1664. Additionally he was named as Secretary for the Sacred Congregation of Bishops and Regulars by Pope Clement X, as well as Governor of Rome and Vice Camerlengo of the Holy Roman Church, while retaining the Secretariat of the Sacred Congregation. He served as Governor of Rome from 26 October 1675 until 1 September 1681, when he was named a cardinal, but continued to hold the office with the title pro-Governor until he was succeeded by his nephew of the same name on 28 July 1691. He was forced to resign as Archbishop of Genoa on 16 March 1681 for reasons of health.

Shortly after his resignation, Spinola was named a Cardinal Priest by Pope Innocent XI, with his titular church that of Santa Cecilia in Trastevere in Rome. He served briefly in the position of Chamberlain of the College of Cardinals, a one-year term that ran from January 1691 to January 1692, to which he was reappointed but resigned in March 1692, for reasons of health. In 1696 he opted for the titular church of the Basilica of Sant'Agnese fuori le mura in Rome, a title he held until he opted for that of the Church of Santa Maria in Trastevere in 1698.

Spinola died in his palace in Rome on 4 January 1704. His body was laid out in the Church of San Lorenzo in Lucina, with his burial taking place on 7 March 1704 at the Church of San Salvatore alle Coppelle, in front of the main altar.

Catholic Church titles
Preceded by Simone Carafa Roccella	Archbishop of Acerenza e Matera; 1648–1664	Succeeded by Vincenzo Lanfranchi
Preceded by Stefano Durazzo	Archbishop of Genoa; 1664–1681	Succeeded by Giulio Vincenzo Gentile
Preceded by Philip Thomas Howard of Norfolk	Cardinal-Priest of Santa Cecilia; 1681–1696	Succeeded by Celestino Sfondrati
Preceded by Toussaint de Forbin de Janson	Cardinal-Priest of Sant'Agnese fuori le mura 1696–1698	Succeeded by Rannuzio Pallavicino
Preceded by Gasparo Carpegna	Cardinal-Priest of Santa Maria in Trastevere; 1698–1704	Succeeded by Urbano Sacchetti
