= Romulus of Genoa =

Roman Catholic saint

Saint Romulus of Genoa
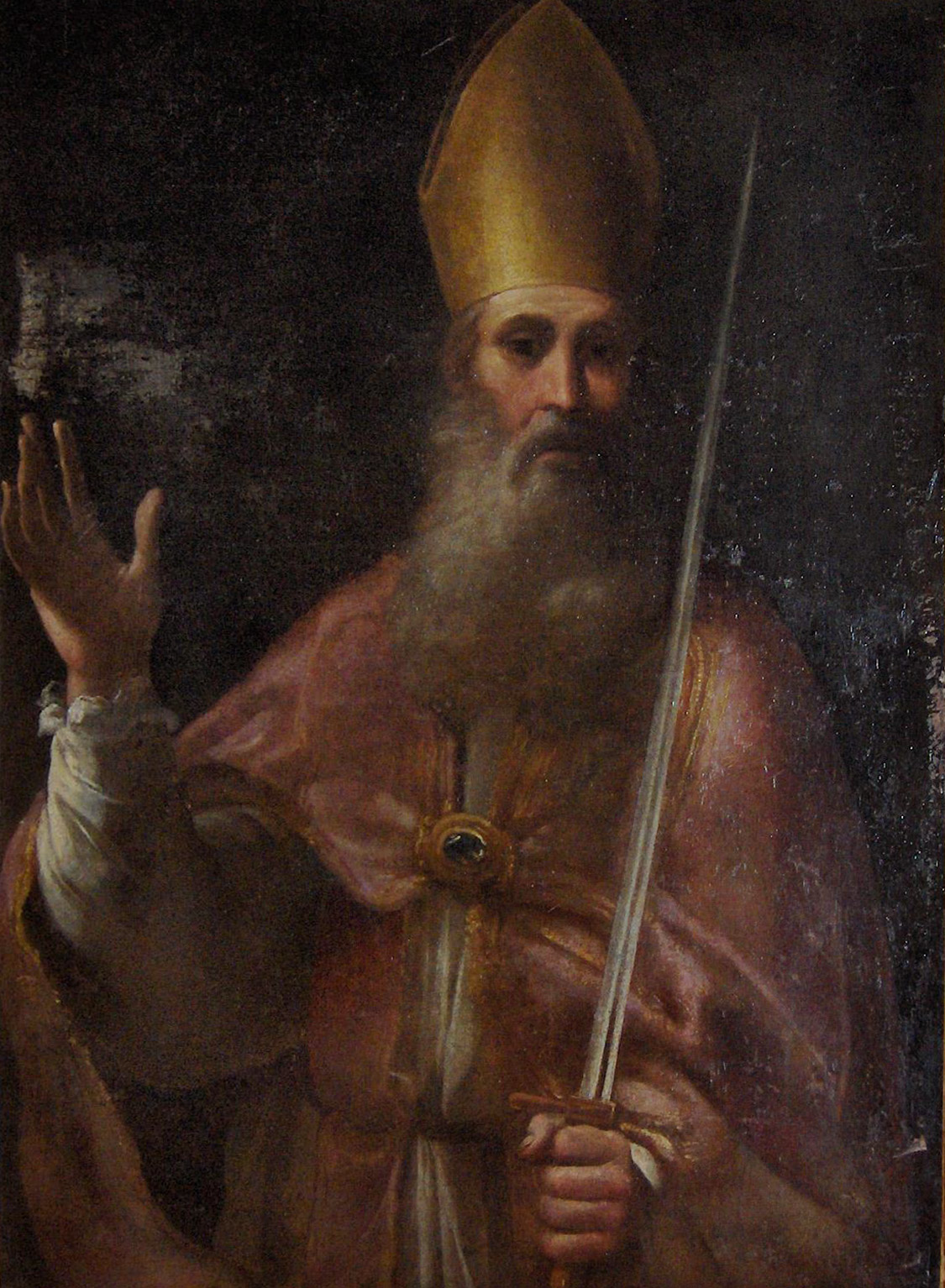
- Saint Romulus, cathedral of San Siro, Sanremo

Bishop and Confessor
- Died: Sanremo, Liguria, Italy
- Venerated in: Roman Catholic Church
- Feast: November 6 (formerly October 13, December 22)
- Attributes: depicted with episcopal dress and a sword in hand

Romulus (or Remo) of Genoa (Italian: Romolo; Ligurian: Reumo(l)o) was an early Bishop of Genoa, around the time of Syrus. His dates are uncertain: since Jacobus de Voragine traditional lists compiled from local liturgies generally place his bishopric fourth in a largely legendary list. He fled from Genoa and never returned He died in the cave he inhabited at Villa Matutiae, (Note: Named for the Roman goddess presiding over childbirth, Mater Matuta; also known as Villa Matuzia, Villa Matutiana and Vicus Matutianus; whether a Roman villa or a vicus is not established.) a town on the Italian Riviera which later adopted his name, becoming San Remo (from 15th century until the first half of the 20th century), and later Sanremo.

== Veneration ==
In 876 the bishop Sabbatinus brought his remains to Genoa, to the church of San Siro, where a new structure was consecrated in 1023.

Since he was invoked in defence of Villa Matutiæ from its inhabitants during enemy attack, Romulus is depicted with episcopal dress and a sword in hand.

The feast day of Saint Romulus had been kept on October 13, the traditional date of his death, as well as on December 22. In the Archdiocese of Genoa his feast day is now celebrated on November 6, together with two more of its early bishops: Valentine of Genoa and Felix of Genoa.
