= Marthae Marchinae Virginis Neapolitanae Musa Postuma =

Collection of Latin poems

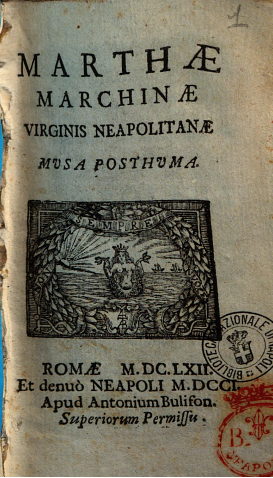
Musa Posthuma was first published in 1662.

Marthae Marchinae Virginis Neapolitanae Musa Posthuma (English translation: The Posthumous Muse of Martha Marchina, the Virgin of Naples) was first published in 1662 (364 years ago), sixteen years after Martha Marchina's death. The book contains a collection of Latin poems attributed to Marchina, including epigrams and odes, as well as letters written by Marchina who was an Early Modern Italian poet whose family made and sold soap. The poetry included in this volume were from the private collection of Virgilio Spada, the brother of Cardinal Bernardino Spada, who had been Martha Marchina's benefactor.

Three of the poems in the collection are thematically linked by depicting the deities Apollo and Selene having a conversation with the Virgin Mary.

== Publication ==
Musa Posthuma was published after Marchina's death. The book was dedicated to Christina, Queen of Sweden. The collection was edited by Francisco Macedo. It is unclear how much Macedo edited her verses. Macedo, though, was responsible for the titles of the poems, some of which offered brief contextualizing statements for the reader. Macedo, however, did seem to play with the order of the poems. The final poem in the collection is an epigram that states "Praecipis ex isto demi mala carmina libro. / Si mala sustuleris, quid reliquum fuerit?" (You instruct that the bad songs should be excised from such a book. / If you will have taken away the bad ones, what will have been left?) Given the content of the epigram, it is unlikely to have been an accidental placement but was instead the intentional placement by an editor. Her corpus of writing was well received for centuries after her death.

=== Contents ===
The book includes several liminal elements, including an address to the Queen of Sweden written by Antonio Bulison. Although this letter is in Italian, the majority of the book is written in Latin. Other liminal elements include: an address to the reader calling Marchina a Sappho (albeit a modern and religious one) and similar to Cornelia, the mother of the Gracchii, Latin poetry by Cardinal Spada and anonymous poems in Marchina's honor, and letters between Cardinal Bernardino Spada and his brother Virgilio Spada. Marchina's epigrams and odes are published and often grouped by similar topics. For example, three poems addressed to the Virgin Mary where Apollo and Selene speak with the Virgin Mary are grouped together. After her final poem, a few of Marchina's letters are included to finish the book, including letters to Cardinal Bernardino Spada and her brother Joseph. These letters offer insight into the texts that Marchina had read and had access to as she references both Horace and Plautus in them. They also reflect her willingness to criticize a man's writing as she offers several critiques on her brother's writing.

== Selected Poems ==
This selection of poems includes the Latin text as well as a modern English and French translations to elucidate Martha Marchina's style and recurring themes in her poetry. Macedo describes her style as "nitidus et facilis, non fucatus, non neglectus," (bright and smooth, not overly colored, nor careless). Jane Stevenson agrees and further suggests that her poetry is "elegant, and often a little melancholy." Selected poems highlight her use of contrasts, nature imagery, religious devotion, and classical allusions.

=== In Eadem Epiphania. Ad puerum Jesum. (On the Same Epiphany. To the Boy Jesus.) ===
Machina has a series of poems about the Epiphany and the three Magi’s visit to the infant Jesus. In this poem, she states the three gifts brought by the kings, namely frankincense, gold, and myrrh, and how she, who is without such fine gifts, offers instead herself to Christ, presumably through her poetry and faith. Marchina plays with the number three through her word choice and word order. Additionally, she sets up contrasts by using several personal pronouns (te, ego, me, tibi) as well as between Christ as king (regem) of heaven and the Magi as kings (reges) on earth.

In Eadem Epiphania. Ad Puerum Jesum.	On the Same Epiphany. To the Boy Jesus.
Te Regem Reges, hominemque, Deumque fatentur Thure, auro, myrrha, munere quisque suo. Ast ego, cui nullum est triplici de munere munus, Me tibi Christe dabo Regi, homini, atque deo.	The kings confess that you are a king, a man, and God With frankincense, gold, and myrrh, each with his own gift. But I, I who have no such three-fold offering, To you, Christ, king, man, and God, I will give myself.

=== De Annunciatione B. Virginis. (On the Annunciation of the Blessed Virgin) ===
This epigram reflects a recurring theme in the book, how the pagan gods, here specifically Apollo, have been supplanted by the Virgin Mary and Jesus. This epigram is written as elegiac couplets in dactylic pentameter. This poem illustrates Marchina's use of contrasts, characteristic of Baroque Latin, through her use of ardens (burning) and nivea (snowy) as well as her use of repetition to explore shades of meaning (velatus, signifying both veiled and concealed).

De Annunciatione B. Virginis.	On the Annunciation of the Blessed Virgin
Ardens Virgineo Phoebus velatus amictu, Mitius ardentes dirigit inde faces. Sic deus intactae nivea modo Virginis alvo Velatus fundit mitis in Orbe faces.	Blazing Phoebus veiled in a maidenly cloak Directs his blazing torches more mildly from there. Thus God now in the snowy womb of the untouched Virgin, Concealed, pours forth mild torches on the earth.

=== Luna Ad Eandem Virginem. (The Moon to the Same Virgin) ===
This epigram connects the Virgin Mary's association with the moon to the pagan goddess Cynthia, whose name is an alternate for Selene or Diana. Because Cynthia has submitted to the Virgin Mary, she now outshines the Greco-Roman sun god, Phoebus Apollo. In this poem, Marchina repeats forms of mico (shine). It also demonstrates a recurring theme of a woman superseding a man's role.

Luna Ad eandem Virginem,	The Moon To the Same Virgin
Olim nocte micans Phœbo redeunte recessi, Et mea pervasit plurimus ora rubor. Postquam Virgo tuis substernor gressibus, ipso Cynthia iam Phœbo clarior ecce mico.	Shining at night, I used to retreat as Phoebus returned– Profuse blush pervaded my cheeks. After submitting to your steps, Virgin, Now I, Cynthia, shine brighter than Phoebus himself.

=== De Beatissima Virgine (On the Most Blessed Virgin) ===
This poem is a distich addressed to the Virgin Mary. Marchina uses this style of writing to unpack layers of meaning by combining three subjects, three verbs, three objects, and three prepositional phrases. Lupercal hosted a poetry contest in this particular style of verse.

De Beatissima Virgine	On the Most Blessed Virgin
Filia, sponsa, parens, flextit, devincit, adorat Patrem, ignem, natum, lege, pudore, prece.	As a daughter, bride, and parent, she persuades, conquers, and reveres, Her father, her passion, and her son, with law, modesty, and prayer.

=== De Eodem Leone (On the Same Lion) ===
In this poem, Martha speaks directly to the constellations arguing for the worthiness of the lion who saved Prisca over the Nemean lion, preserved in the heavens as the constellation Leo. In several epigrams, Marchina writes to heavenly bodies, such as the sun, moon, and stars, in order to elevate a Christian figure over pagan or classical figures. During the reign of Claudius, Prisca was condemned for her Christian faith and put up against a lion in the amphitheater. The lion, however, lay down at her feet, a moment referenced by Marchina in another epigram titled “D. Prisca Virgo, & Martyr Leoni objecta.” In “De eodem Leone,” Marchina effectively utilizes word placement to punctuate her arguments, namely Leonem (lion) ends line one to create direct contrast to Hoc (this, understood lion) starting line two.

De Eodem Leone	On the Same Lion
Sidera, si vobus curæ est servare Leonem, Hoc nullus vestro dignior orbe fuit.	Constellations, if it concerns you to preserve a Lion, None was worthier for your orbit than this one.

=== Agatha Virgo Vulneribus Decorata (The Virgin Agatha Graced with Wounds) ===
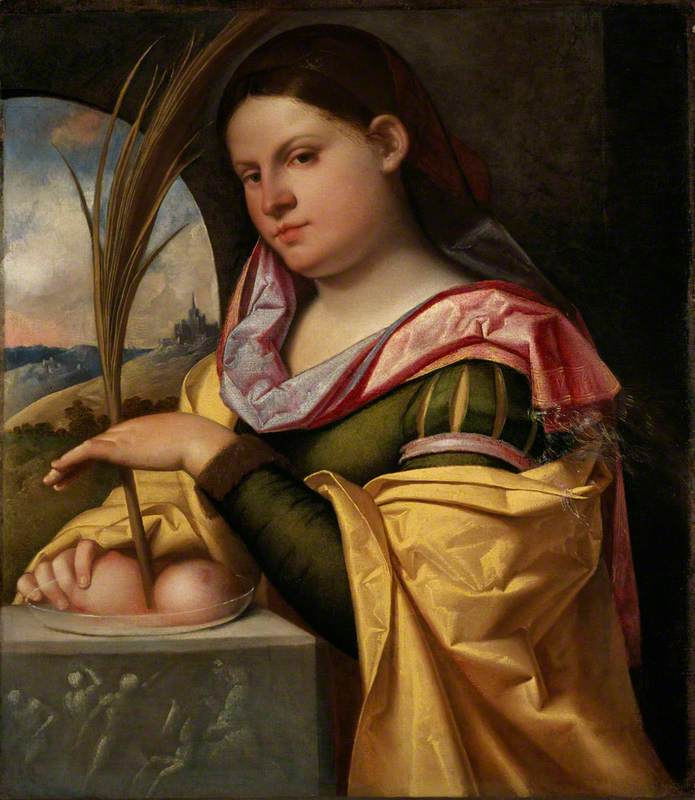
Saint Agatha was tortured before she was martyred.

Marchina often adopts the persona of other women in her poetry. She speaks in this poem from the persona of Saint Agatha who was tortured after refusing to submit to the Roman prefect Quintianus' amorous advances. Marchina's approach to this poem is unique for her reclamation of Agatha's identity and sense of self through the use of brutal imagery in contrast to Agatha's purity, and her resolute belief that she has become more beautiful through these pains.

Agatha Virgo Vulneribus Decorata	The Virgin Agatha Graced with Wounds
Ubera præcidit geminatio vulnere lictor, Sed formam lædunt vulnera nulla meam. Namque ego purpureo cœpi decorata colore Inter Virgineas pulchrior esse nives.	The lictor sliced off my breasts with doubled blows, But no wounds mar my nature. For adorned by the color of a red rose amid virgin snows I have begun to be more beautiful.

=== D. Marthæ S. Marii coniugi, & Matri S.S Audisacis & Abachii (About Martha, the Spouse of Marius, and the Mother of SS Audifax and Abachius) ===
Marchina addresses Saint Martha's martyrdom, along with her husband and her two children, in this poem. Marchina makes strong contrasts here between a Saint Martha's loss of both her hands as more powerful than the loss of Gaius Mucius Scaevola's one left hand. Marchina uses a female saint to supplant a pagan story, but she also uses a woman's martyrdom to supplant a male warrior.

D. Marthæ S. Marii coniugi, & Matri S.S Audisacis & Abachii	About Martha, the Spouse of Marius, and the Mother of SS Audifax and Abachius
Sponte subit flammas, ensesque invicta Virago, Nec timor est raptam cernere utramque manum; Ne iactet dextra contemptos Mutius ignes: Plus potuit pro te fœmina, Christe, pati.	Indomitable she endures the flames and swords willingly, a hero, Nor does she fear to witness both of her hands ravaged; Mucius shouldn't boast of the fires slighted by his right hand: A woman, O Christ, was able to suffer more on your behalf.

=== In Indoctum Poetam (Against the Unlearned Poet) ===
This epigram demonstrates Marchina's unfailing willingness to defend her own poetry as well as to point out the mistakes of other male poets, particularly those who criticize her own work. Because poeta is a masculine noun and the adjective accompanying the that noun (indoctum) is also masculine, the addressee of this poem is safely assumed to be a man. Minerva is the Roman goddess strongly associated with intelligence, but she also can represent a writer's innate talent or muse. It is unclear who the indoctus poeta (unlearned poet) is who criticized her poetry, but Marchina repeatedly experienced men criticizing her work or accusing her of plagiarism. Both Ludovico Santolino and Antonio Quaerengo initially accused her of plagiarism, Quaenrengo went so far as to demand she compose a poem about Jacob and the Angel in front of him. Both men, after their initial doubts, then supported her writing efforts.

In Indoctum Poetam	Against the Unlearned Poet
Quid tibi cum nostra est, vates indocte, Minerva? Hic te nullus honor, præmia nulla manent. Cernis, ut innumeris turpatur pagina mendis, Vulneribusque tuis carmina læsa dolent? Redde igitur Musis calamos, fessosque libellos: Non sunt hæc dextra munera digna tua.	What business do you have with our Minerva, ignorant poet? Here no honor remains for you, no prizes. Don't you see your page is stained by countless errors, And your poems ache, struck by your wounds? So return your pen to the Muses, tired booklets too: These gifts deserve better than your right hand.

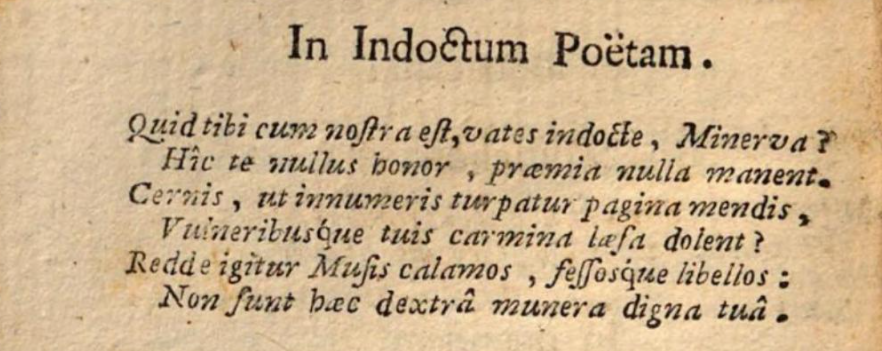
Marchina's "In Indoctum Poetam" poem in her book Musa Posthuma.

=== Ad Anien Fluvium (To the River Aniene) ===
This poem is distich. It is one of several poems that utilizes the vocative case to address people or elements in nature, here the Aniene River. The Aniene flows into the Tiber in Rome and is a central natural feature of Rome where Marchina spent most of her life. The poem can be interpreted as a metaphor on life where the river's original rush reflects the rush through childhood and approaching Rome, as a symbol of erudition and erudition, represents adulthood. Marchina urges both the river and the reader to slow down to appreciate the moments in life. Further, as Jane Stevenson writes, "In the pagan period, of course, the devotion to springs had been a serious matter: 'the resident spirit of rivers and springs is more than mere metaphor: it is a crucial fact of local cult. A region is characterized--indeed it is personified--in the river flowing through it, or rising in it.' Similarly, Servius comments, 'there is no stream that is not holy.' But by the fifth century, the cultivating of springs was romantic or antiquarian, rather than a matter of serious feeling." Marchina's use of a poem addressing a river, and one central to the place she lived, Marchina reflects knowledge of the classical tradition of addressing and personifying rivers and springs.

Ad Anien Fluvium	To the River Aniene
Ut Romam videas, præceps perque a via curris; Iam potes hic Romam cernere, siste gradum.	You rush headlong through the wilderness to see Rome: Now you can glimpse her from here–rest your course.
