= Ugone della Volta =

Ugone della Volta was the second Archbishop of Genoa from 1163 to 1188 after Siro de' Porcello. He was a peacemaker in the city of Genoa, mediating between the various factions and families at a time when it was growing into a Mediterranean power.

In 1179, he was accompanied by Nuvolone Alberici to the Third Lateran Council in Rome.

In 1180, he consecrated the church of San Torpete and, in 1184, he created the abbey of Borzone in Borzonasca and donated it the Benedictines of Marseille.
