= Berlinghiero Gessi =

Italian Catholic Cardinal

His Eminence Berlinghiero Gessi
- Bishop of Rimini
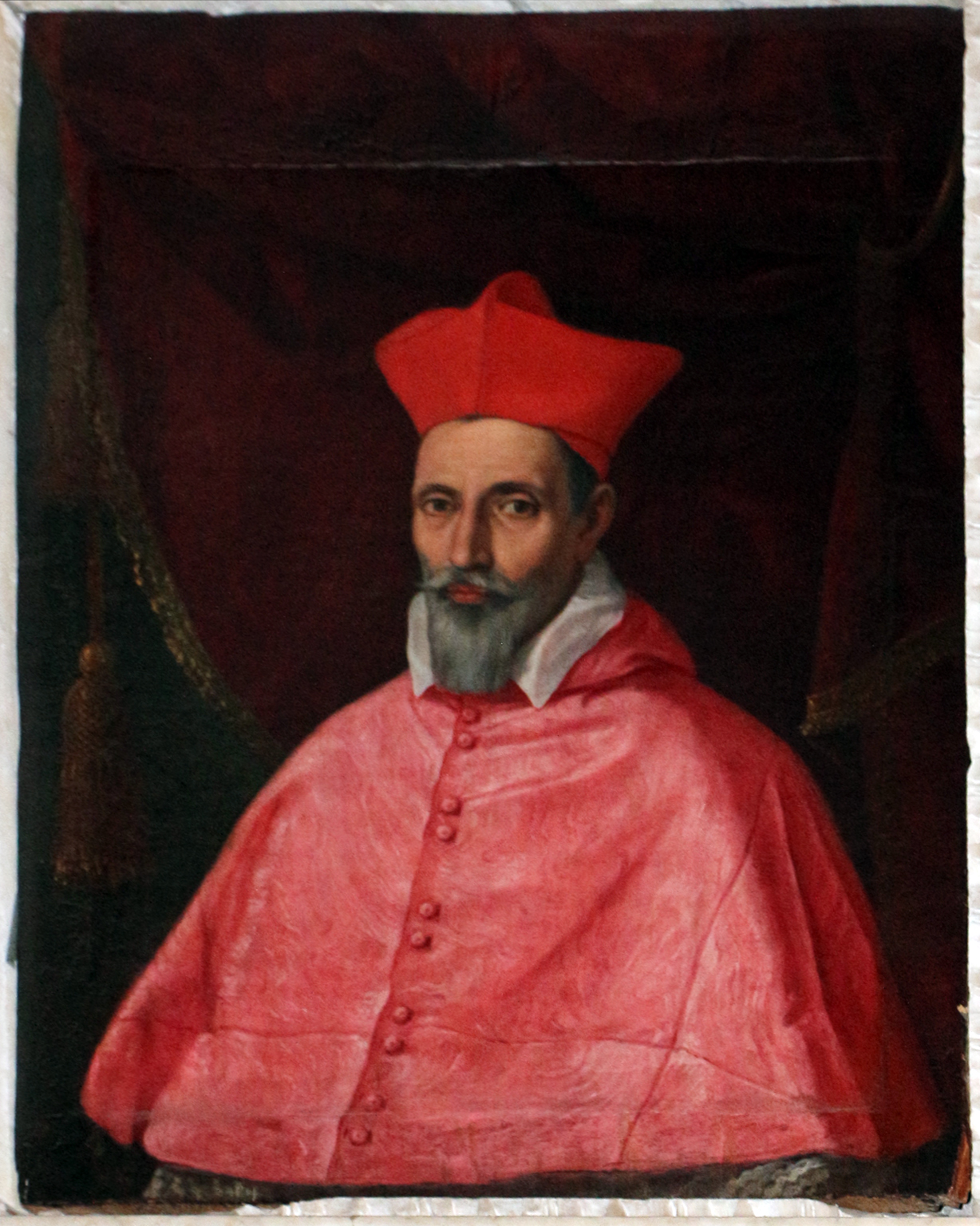
- Portrait by Guido Reni
- Church: Catholic Church
- Diocese: Rimini
- Appointed: 13 November 1606
- Term ended: 20 November 1619
- Predecessor: Giulio Cesare Salicini
- Successor: Cipriano Pavoni
- Other posts: Cardinal-Priest of Sant'Agostino (1627-1639)
- Previous posts: Apostolic Nuncio to Venice (1607-1618)

Orders
- Consecration: 19 November 1606 by Antonmaria Sauli
- Created cardinal: 19 January 1626 by Pope Urban VIII
- Rank: Cardinal-Priest

Personal details
- Born: 28 October 1563 Bologna, Italy
- Died: 6 April 1639 (aged 75) Rome, Papal States
- Buried: Santa Maria sopra Minerva
- Coat of arms

Berlinghiero Gessi (28 October 1563 – 6 April 1639) was an Italian Catholic Cardinal.

== Early life ==
Gessi was born in Bologna on 28 October 1563, the son of Giulio Cesare Gessi, doctor of philosophy and medicine, and Valeria Segni. He was a relative of Pope Gregory XIII. He was educated at the University of Bologna where he graduated in 1583 (at age 20) with a doctorate in utroque iure. Thereafter he went to Rome to assist his uncle who was auditor of the Sacred Roman Rota and to practice law. He returned to Bologna in 1589 to take up a position as professor of law at his alma mater.

== Ecclesiastic career ==
In 1590, Gessi went to Rome to become vicar-general in support of another uncle, the then-bishop of Rieti. He subsequently served as vicar-general of Benevento, vicar-general of his native Bologna in 1591, and then provost of the cathedral chapter of that same city the following year.

In 1594, he returned to Rome and was named referendary of the Tribunals of the Apostolic Signature of Justice and of Grace and a secretary of the Sacred Consulta. In 1599, he was named civil lieutenant to Cardinal Girolamo Rusticucci, the vicar-general of Rome and Vice-regent of Rome from 1600 to 1607.

On 13 November 1606, Gessi was elected bishop of Rimini and was consecrated 6 days later in the Sistine Chapel by Antonio Sauli, who was also an alumnus of the University of Bologna. The following year he was appointed nuncio to Venice, a position he held until 1618. During his term as nuncio, relations between Rome and Venice were strained. Gessi advised a cautious Roman approach toward issues of significance to the Venetians, like the distribution of benefices. The warnings were heeded and relationship continued without major conflict.

In 1618, he was appointed governor of Rome itself. But in 1619 he suffered severe gout and was forced to resign his diocese. In 1621, he was finally confirmed as Governor, a position he then held until 1623.

In 1624, Francesco Maria II della Rovere's last heir died of epilepsy and the duke was forced to hand control of the Duchy of Urbino to the papacy. The new pope, Urban VIII, assigned Gessi to the territory as administrator and apostolic governor until 1627, while the pope's nephew, Taddeo Barberini took control of the duchy's income and titles. The territory was eventually annexed into the Papal States.

In 1625/6, the Guido Reni painted The Crucifixion on commission for Gessi; this painting is a version of his Crucifixion of the Cappuccini now on display in the Pinacoteca Nazionale of Bologna. The painting owned by Gessi was later bequeathed to the Church of Santa Maria della Vittoria, Rome, before being purchased in 1801 by Pietro Camuccini and subsequently by Algernon Percy, 4th Duke of Northumberland for his art collection at Alnwick Castle, where it is now on display.

== Cardinalate ==
Before Gessi's governorship there had finished, Pope Urban elevated him to cardinal on 19 January 1626 and appointed him cardinal-priest of the Basilica of Sant'Agostino the following year. He remained among a close circle of supporters who regularly dined with the pope, despite being recognised for his "rather gloomy" temperament.

In 1633, he was named prefect of the Tribunal of the Apostolic Signature of Justice and he served as Camerlengo of the Sacred College of Cardinals January 1639 until his death only a few months later.

Gessi died on 6 April 1639 in Rome and was buried at the church of Santa Maria sopra Minerva.
