= Bernardino Spada =

Italian cardinal

His Eminence Bernardino Spada
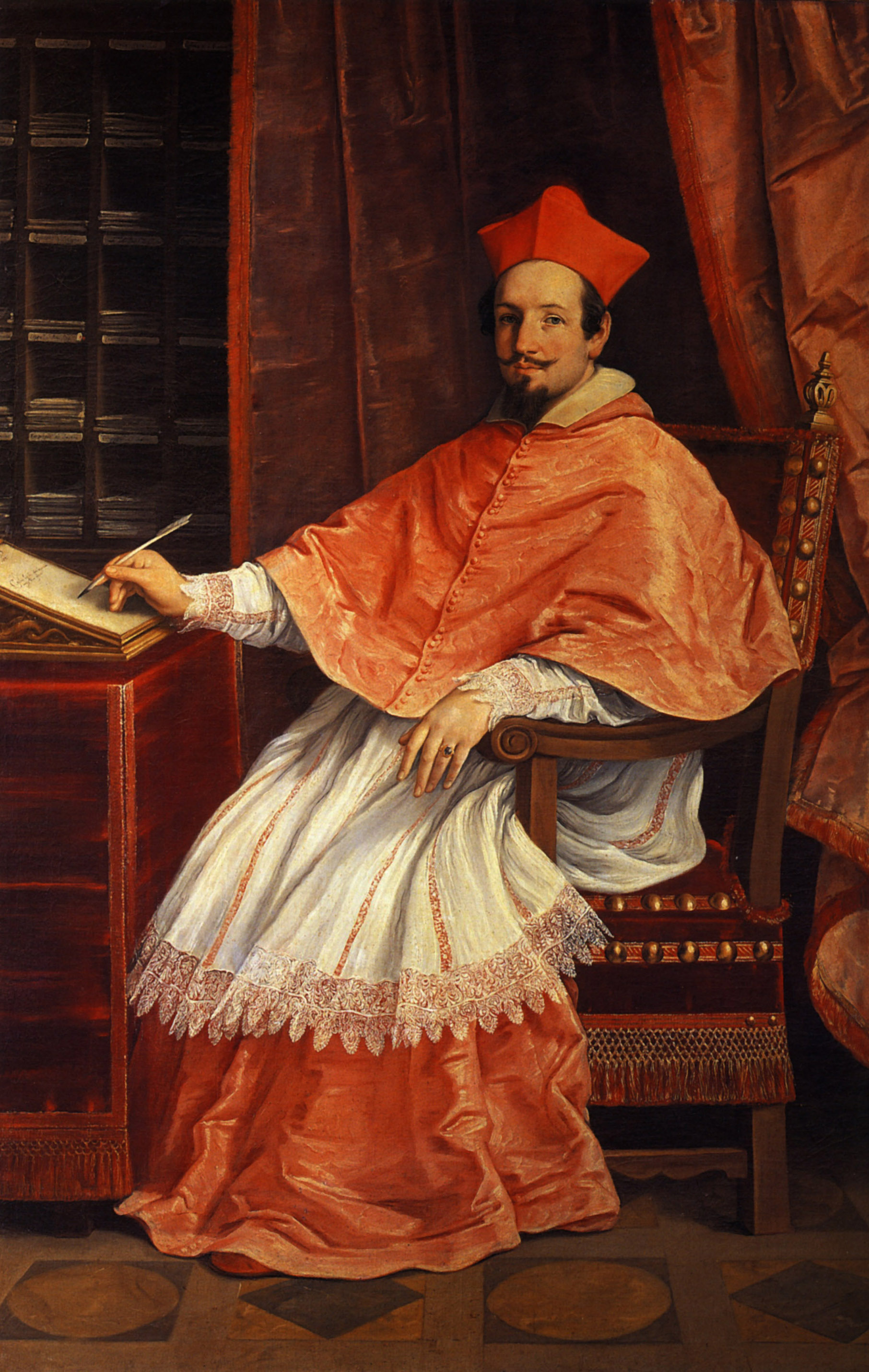
- Cardinal Spada. Oil painting by Guido Reni, c. 1631. Galleria Spada, Rome
- Other post: Cardinal-bishop of Palestrina
- Previous posts: Apostolic nuncio to France (1623–1627); Titular archbishop of Tamiathis (1623–1626); Cardinal-priest of Santo Stefano al Monte Celio (1627–1642); Camerlengo of the Sacred College of Cardinals (1638–1639); Cardinal-priest of San Pietro in Vincoli (1642–1646); Cardinal-bishop of Albano (1646–1652); Cardinal-bishop of Frascati (1652); Cardinal-bishop of Sabina (1652–1655)

Orders
- Ordination: 1623
- Consecration: 8 December 1623 by Guido Bentivoglio d'Aragona
- Created cardinal: 19 January 1626 by Pope Urban VIII
- Rank: Cardinal-priest, later cardinal-bishop

Personal details
- Born: 21 April 1594 Brisighella, Italy
- Died: 10 November 1661 (aged 67) Rome, Italy
- Buried: San Girolamo della Carità, Rome
- Denomination: Roman Catholic
- Parents: Paolo Spada
- Education: University of Bologna; University of Perugia

Bernardino Spada (21 April 1594 – 10 November 1661) was an Italian Cardinal of the Roman Catholic Church and a patron of the arts whose collection is housed in the Palazzo Spada in Rome.

== Early life ==
Spada was born in Brisighella, current province of Ravenna (Romagna). His father was the rich merchant Paolo Spada (unrelated to the Spada family of ancient nobility) who had directed him early on to a career in the church, though the generations before his had been colliers. Bernardino studied law in Bologna, Perugia and Rome and received a doctorate. He served in the Papal Curia from 1617.

== Ecclesiastic career ==
On 8 December 1623, he was consecrated bishop in the church of San Luigi dei Francesi in Rome by Cardinal Guido Bentivoglio d'Aragona, assisted by Guillaume du Nozet, Titular Archbishop of Seleucia, and by François Boyvin de Péricard, Bishop of Evreux. In December 1623 he was appointed papal nuncio to the court of France, in preparation for which he was ordained titular archbishop of Tamiathis. He served as nuncio until 1627, when he became papal legate in Bologna. He was made a cardinal 19 January 1626 by Pope Urban VIII. When the plague epidemic hit Bologna in 1630/1631, he helped organize the health care system there.

From 1631 he served again in Rome, filling several influential positions in the Curia. In 1632 he purchased what is now called the Palazzo Spada in the rione Regola, facing Piazza Capo di Ferro with a garden looking over the Tiber, and commissioned Francesco Borromini to modify it for him in a more Baroque style, to house his growing collections.

== War of Castro ==
During the First War of Castro he served as plenipotentiary of Pope Urban VIII; sent to negotiate a truce with the Duchy of Parma, together with his brother Virgilio. Spada successfully negotiated a truce but when the pope's military leaders became aware that the dukes were massing troops to counter their troops (in case discussions with Spada came to nought), Urban VIII declared the articles of peace null and void and claimed Spada had negotiated them without his consent. Spada was furious and later published a manifesto detailing his version of events which, according to contemporary John Bargrave, many accepted to be the truth.

== Andrea Casale ==
In his profile of Spada, from his own observations and those of others, Bargrave also recounts Spada's dealings with Bologna nobleman Andrea Casale. Casale had been sent to Germany to fight in the armies of the Holy Roman Empire during the 30 Years' War where he was captured. While a prisoner, Casale inherited a large estate which Spada then came to manage on behalf of Casale's relatives (who expected Casale to never return). Casale was eventually released and returned to Bologna where he had great difficulty proving he was, in fact, Andrea Casale. But a nurse who had treated Casale as a young man came forward and identified him from specific marks on his body. Nonetheless, Spada had the man imprisoned where he was beaten to death. Bargrave recounted that the story had been told to him in Rome, "much to the Cardinal's disadvantage".

== Later ecclesiastic career ==
Spada was successively Bishop of Albano, Frascati, Sabina and Palestrina. Bernardino supported the church careers of several of his family members. His nephew Giovanni Battista Spada became cardinal in 1654 and his great-nephew Fabrizio Spada became cardinal in 1675 and Cardinal Secretary of State in 1691. He died in Rome in 1661 and was interred in the family grave in the church of San Girolamo della Carità.

== Literary influence and patronage ==
Spada was the patron of Martha Marchina, an Italian soapmaker who wrote poetry in Latin, for ten years. Spada recognized her literary talents after exchanging epigrams about the plague that was ravaging Italy at that time. Spada was largely responsible for the publication of Musa Posthuma, a collection of Marchina's poetry, though it was first published after his death in 1662. Spada included some of his own poetry, including a dedicatory poem written in Latin, addressed to the former queen of Sweden, Christine. Several of Spada's letters to Marchina and to his brother Vergilius Spada are also included in Musa Posthuma, which are written in Italian and Latin. Several of Marchina's poems written about Spada are also included in the book.

== Episcopal succession ==
Episcopal succession of Bernardino Spada

While bishop, he was the principal consecrator of:

- Richard Smith (bishop), Titular Bishop of Chalcedon (1625);
- Timoteo Pérez Vargas, Coadjutor Bishop of Ispahan and Bishop of Baghdad (1632);
- Juan Boldames Ibáñez, Bishop of Ispahan and Auxiliary Bishop of Toledo (1632);
- Vittore Capello, Titular Bishop of Famagusta (1633);
- Costantino de Rossi, Bishop of Cefalonia e Zante (1634);
- Diego Requeséns, Titular Archbishop of Cartagine (1637);
- Prospero Spínola, Bishop of Luni e Sarzana (1637);
- Attilio Orsini, Bishop of Montepeloso (1638);
- Pietro Paolo Bonsi, Bishop of Acerno (1638);
- Giovanni Francesco Gozzadini, Bishop of Rethymo (1641);
- Alessandro Pauli, Bishop of Vico Equense (1643);
- Antonio Montecatini, Bishop of Foligno (1643);
- Pier Francesco Filonardi, Bishop of Anagni (1646);
- Carlo de' Vecchi, Bishop of Chiusi (1648);
- Francesco Maria Ghislieri, Bishop of Terracina, Priverno e Sezze (1649);
- Pietro Paolo Russo, Bishop of Nusco (1649);
- Christophoro d'Authier de Sisgau, Titular Bishop of Bethleem (1651);
- Vincenzo Candiotti, Bishop of Bagnoregio (1653);
- Carlo Settala, Bishop of Tortona (1653);
- Luis Alfonso de Los Cameros, Bishop of Patti (1654);
- Marco Antonio Pisanelli, Bishop of Vulturara e Montecorvino (1654);
- Bernardino d'Aragona, Bishop of Bova (1657); and
- Filippo Visconti (bishop), Bishop of Catanzaro (1657).

He also ordained John Leyburn (1646) as priest.

== Books ==
- Arne Karsten: Kardinal Bernardino Spada; Eine Karriere im barocken Rom, Goettingen 2001 (German) ISBN 3525362498

Catholic Church titles
Preceded by	Titular Archbishop of Tamiathis; 1623–1627	Succeeded by Cesare Facchinetti
Preceded by Guido Bentivoglio d'Aragona	Apostolic Nuncio to France; 1623–1627	Succeeded by Giovanni Francesco Guidi di Bagno
Preceded by Lucio Sanseverino	Cardinal-Priest of Santo Stefano al Monte Celio; 1627–1642	Succeeded by Juan de Lugo y de Quiroga
Preceded by Antonio Marcello Barberini	Cardinal-Priest of San Pietro in Vincoli; 1642–1646	Succeeded by Marzio Ginetti
Preceded by Gaspar de Borja y Velasco	Cardinal-Bishop of Albano; 1646–1652	Succeeded by Federico Baldissera Bartolomeo Cornaro
Preceded by Carlo de' Medici	Cardinal-Bishop of Frascati; 1652	Succeeded by Giulio Cesare Sacchetti
Preceded by Francesco Barberini (seniore)	Cardinal-Bishop of Sabina; 1652–1655	Succeeded by Giulio Cesare Sacchetti
Preceded by Alfonso de la Cueva-Benavides y Mendoza-Carrillo	Cardinal-Bishop of Palestrina; 1655–1661	Succeeded by Antonio Barberini (iuniore)
