= Archdiocese of Genoa =

Roman Catholic archdiocese in Italy

Coordinates: 44.4075°N 8.9316°E

Archdiocese of Genoa Archidioecesis Ianuensis

Catholic
- Cathedral of San Lorenzo, Genoa

Location
- Country: Italy
- Ecclesiastical province: Genoa

Statistics
- Area: 966 km^{2} (373 sq mi)
- Population: Total; Catholics: (as of 2016); 800,574; 672,482 (84.0%)

Information
- Denomination: Catholic
- Sui iuris church: Latin Church
- Rite: Roman Rite
- Established: 3rd Century
- Cathedral: Cattedrale di S. Lorenzo
- Secular priests: 273 (diocesan); 220 (Religious Orders); 30 Permanent Deacons

Current leadership
- Pope: Leo XIV
- Archbishop: Marco Tasca, OFM Conv
- Bishops emeritus: Tarcisio Bertone, SDB; Angelo Bagnasco

Map
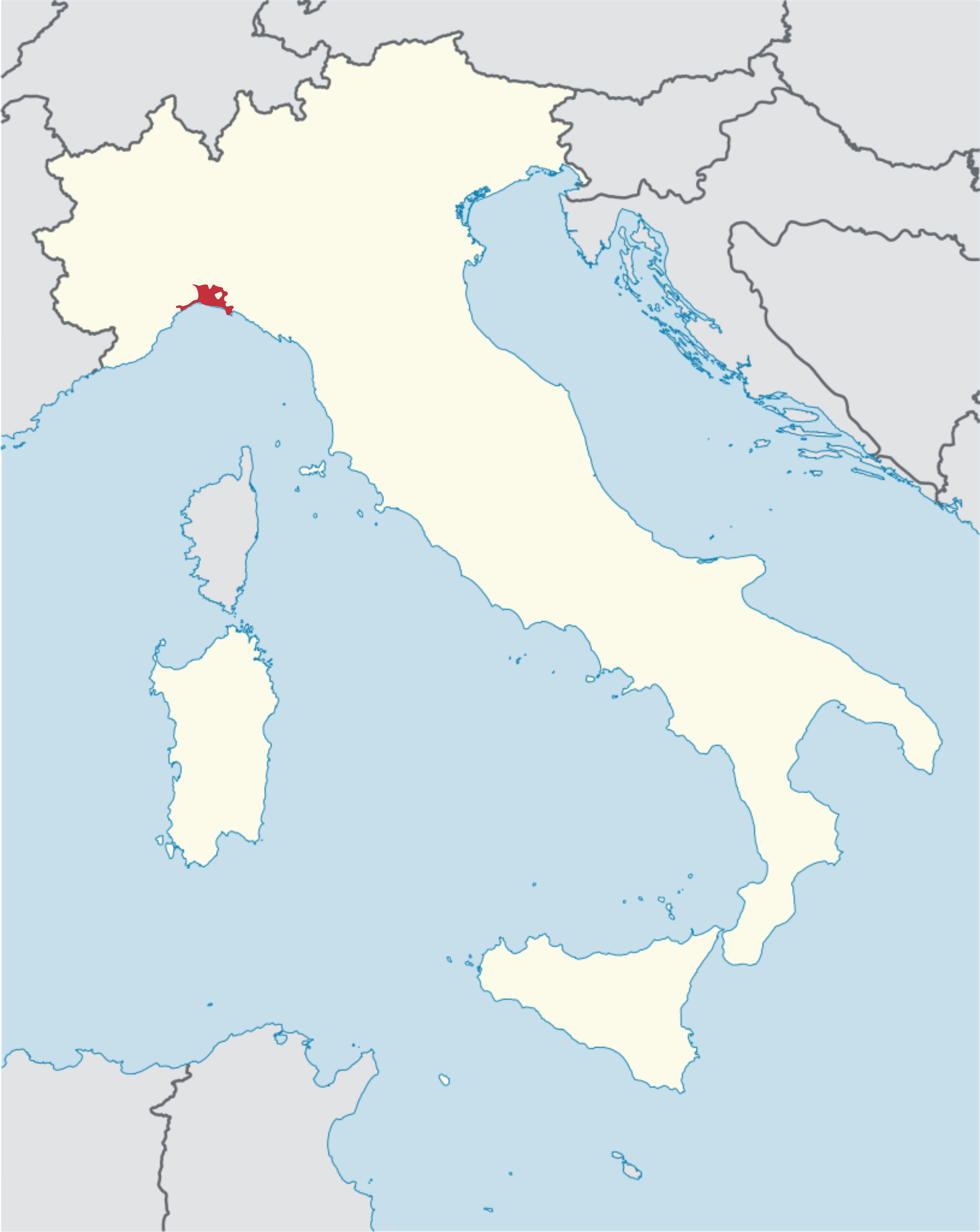

Website
- chiesadigenova.it

The Archdiocese of Genoa (Latin: Archidioecesis Ianuensis) is a Latin Church ecclesiastical territory or diocese of the Catholic Church in Italy. Erected in the 3rd century, it was elevated to an archdiocese on 20 March 1133. The archdiocese of Genoa was, in 1986, united with the Diocese of Bobbio-San Colombano, forming the Archdiocese of Genoa-Bobbio; however a split in 1989 renamed it the "Archdiocese of Genoa."

The Archdiocese of Genoa is a metropolitan archdiocese, the suffragan dioceses in its ecclesiastical province are the Diocese of Albenga-Imperia, Diocese of Chiavari, Diocese of La Spezia-Sarzana-Brugnato, Diocese of Savona-Noli, Diocese of Tortona, and Diocese of Ventimiglia-San Remo.

== Territory ==
The territory of the Archidiocese covers 967 km² and includes, fully or in part, the following municipalities (in two Italian Regions, Liguria and Piedmont, as a legacy of the territory of the former Republic of Genoa):

- In the Metropolitan City of Genoa (Liguria): Genoa, Arenzano, Avegno, Bargagli, Bogliasco, Busalla (town center only), Camogli, Campomorone, Ceranesi, Davagna, Isola del Cantone (town center only), Mele, Mignanego, Montoggio, Pieve Ligure, Recco, Ronco Scrivia (except for Pietrafraccia), Sant'Olcese, Savignone (Isorelle and San Bartolomeo only), Serra Riccò, Sori, Tribogna, Uscio, Valbrevenna (except for Nenno and Tonno) e Vobbia.
- In the Province of Alessandria (Piedmont): Arquata Scrivia (Rigoroso and Sottovalle only), Bosio, Carrosio, Fraconalto, Gavi, Mongiardino Ligure, Parodi Ligure e Voltaggio.

== History ==
During the 9th century the entire coast of Liguria was threatened by repeated incursions of Saracen raiders. The people were enslaved, driven off or killed. The danger to church property grew so severe that, c. 878, Bishop Sabatinus of Genoa had the remains of S. Romulus removed from his tomb in Villa Matutiana (San Remo) and brought to Genoa and placed in the crypt of the Cathedral of San Lorenzo in Genoa. Muslims from North Africa thoroughly sacked Genoa in 934–935, and the site was probably abandoned for a few years. In 980, when the threat of the Saracens had receded, Bishop Teodulfus, seeing that the devastated lands were recovering and that the decima tax was able to be collected again, donated the income of those lands to the maintenance of the Canons of the Cathedral (nostrorum cardinalium clericorum mancipamus usui).

In October 1118, Pope Gelasius II arrived in Genoa from Pisa, having fled from the violence of the Frangipani family in Rome. On 10 October he consecrated the church of Ss. Lorenzo e Siro in Genoa.

=== An Archbishopric ===
In 1130 the diocese of Genoa faced a series of crises. In Rome, Pope Honorius II died on 13 February 1130. Two separate conclaves were held, and each elected a pope, Anacletus II (Petrus Pierleoni) and Innocent II (Gregorius Papareschi). Both sides immediately appealed for recognition and support from the King of the Romans, Lothair of Supplinburg. At the time, Lothair was in a fierce struggle for the imperial crown against Conrad III (Hohenstaufen) who had been crowned King of Italy with the Iron Crown of Lombardy by Archbishop Anselm of Milan in 1128. For this act he and the city of Milan were placed under papal interdict. Innocent was not able to maintain himself in Rome against the opposition of the majority of the Cardinals, of the clergy, of the nobility, and of the people of Rome, though for a time he held the Trastevere; in May or June he fled the City, and arrived in Pisa c. 20 June, and on 2 August he was in Genoa. Meanwhile, in Milan, Archbishop Anselm had announced his support for Pope Anacletus, though a substantial number of Milanese objected to his choice and campaigned for Innocent. The opposition was led by the Archpriest, Stephanus Guandeca, who brought the people around to repudiating Anacletus, recognizing Innocent, and deposing Anselm.

The Annales Genuenses of Caffaro di Caschifellone, a contemporary of Bishop Syrus, states that Pope Innocent was present when Syrus was elected Bishop of Genoa, but that he was consecrated in the same year by Pope Innocent at Sanctus Egidius (near the later city of Montpellier). Archbishop Jacobus de Voragine, however, seems to say that Innocent consecrated Syrus Bishop of Genoa when he was staying in Genoa. At the time of his election as bishop, Syrus was already a Cardinal of the Holy Roman Church, having been named by Innocent himself earlier in the year 1130. In any case, Pope Innocent and his Court were transported to southern France by the galleys of the Genoese navy, for which the Pope was grateful. It was one of the considerations in his naming the bishops of Genoa to the rank of archbishop.

Pope Innocent returned to Italy in April 1132, and took up residence in Pisa in January 1133. The See of Milan was vacant, and Pope Innocent took the opportunity, on 20 March 1133, to remove Genoa from the Metropolitanate of Milan, and create a new Metropolitanate at Genoa, with Syrus as its first Archbishop. Five days later, the Pope wrote again, extending the use of the pallium and naming Syrus and his successors Commendatory Abbots of the monastery of S. Syro. The new suffragans of the Metropolitanate of Genoa were: Mariana, Nebbio, and Accia (on Corsica); Bobbio, and Brugnato (newly created), to which was added the diocese of Albenga, formerly in the Metropolitanate of Milan.

According to Pope Innocent II's bull, the archbishop of Genoa was to be consecrated only by the pope. This stipulation was changed by Pope Alexander III in a bull of 9 April 1161, which specified that the archbishop of Genoa, like the archbishop of Pisa, was to be consecrated by his suffragan bishops. Another bull of 25 March 1162 repeated the order.

=== Failed election ===
In 1288, on the death of Archbishop Bernardus, the Chapter met and conducted several ballots to choose his successor. They were unsuccessful in coalescing around a candidate, and therefore appointed a committee of four Canons to choose the next Archbishop. The four members, Nicolinus de Camilla, Jacobus de Voragine, Thedisius Fieschi, and Ottobono Spinola, were unable to come to an agreement, and therefore resigned the choice to the Pope. On 4 June 1288, Pope Nicholas IV appointed as Administrator of the diocese of Genoa the contemporary Latin Patriarch of Antioch, Obizzo Fieschi, a nephew of Pope Innocent IV, who had been driven out of his own diocese by the Saracens (propter Agarenorum perfidiam). In 1292, Opizzo Fieschi resigned, and Pope Nicholas appointed Jacobus de Voragine to the Archbishopric of Genoa.

=== A Pope in Genoa ===
Urban VI, who represented the "Roman Obedience" at the beginning of the Great Western Schism (1378–1417), had been intriguing to set up a principality for his nephew Butillo in the Kingdom of Naples. He helped Charles of Durazzo to overthrow Queen Johanna of Naples, and then crowned him in Rome in 1381. The Pope's interference in Neapolitan affairs, however, caused King Charles and a number of Urban's cardinals to create a plan to remove Urban from power because of his incapacity, and institute a Council of Regency. In response Urban imprisoned and tortured six cardinals, but Charles responded by besieging the Pope in the town of Nocera (Lucera). During the siege, on 12 January 1385, the Pope had Cardinal Joannes de Amelia executed.

On 7 July 1385, Urban managed to escape. During his flight the horse of the Bishop of Aquila went lame, and the Pope ordered the bishop to be killed. His intended refuge, the papal city of Benevento, refused to receive him. He broke his way in, extracted money from the inhabitants, and made arrangements with the captains of the Genoese galleys who were standing off Naples to take his party on board and convey them to Genoa. A rendezvous had to take place on the eastern coast of southern Italy, since the western coast was in the hands of Charles of Durazzo. When they arrived at Barletta, they found that it too had joined Charles. It was only off the beach near Trani that the papal party was taken aboard ten Genoese galleys and transported to Genoa. On 23 September 1385 the galleys arrived in Genoa. Urban took up residence in the Hospital of Saint John, which he did not leave during his entire stay in the city. The five cardinals whom he held under arrest were with him. He had several members of his Curia arrested and tortured because he suspected that they were trying to liberate the cardinals.

The Genoese them presented the bill to the Pope for his rescue operation, amounting to 80,000 florins. The Pope assigned to the Genoese the city of Corneto, a seaport in the Patrimony of Saint Peter, as payment. After more than a year in Genoa, the Doge of Genoa urged the Pope to find other accommodations, since strife between papal supporters and the inhabitants of the city were a constant threat to the Republic. Before he departed in December 1386, Pope Urban had four of his cardinal prisoners executed. Only Cardinal Adam de Easton escaped, because of the personal intervention of Richard II of England.

=== Cathedral and Chapter ===
At the beginning of the 18th century, the Chapter of the Cathedral of S. Lorenzo was composed of five dignities and twelve Canons. The dignities were: the Provost, the Archdeacon, the Archpriest, the Majusculus, and the Primicerius. The Archdeacon and Archpriest are already found in 980 under Bishop Teodulfus.

Pope Innocent VIII had once been Provost of the Cathedral Chapter.

=== Synods ===
A diocesan synod was an irregular but important meeting of the bishop of a diocese and his clergy. Its purpose was (1) to proclaim generally the various decrees already issued by the bishop; (2) to discuss and ratify measures on which the bishop chose to consult with his clergy; (3) to publish statutes and decrees of the diocesan synod, of the provincial synod, and of the Holy See.

The earliest known diocesan synod took place in 1216, according to Jacobus de Voragine, immediately after the return of Bishop Otto from the Fourth Lateran Council. The bishop explained to his clergy what had been decided, and ordered the decisions of the Council to be observed. The earliest known provincial synod took place in the Cathedral of S. Lorenzo in 1294, according to Jacobus. The remains of S. Syro, the alleged first bishop of Genoa, were solemnly recognized and enshrined beneath the altar of S. Lorenzo.

In 1310, Archbishop Porchetto Spinola (1299–1321) held a provincial synod, in which the Statutes of Genoa pertaining to the imprisonment of persons for unpaid debts, including clerics, was debated. Archbishop Andrea della Torre (1368–1377) held a synod in 1375. On 10 January 1421, Archbishop Pileo de' Marini (1400–1433) held a diocesan synod, which was chiefly concerned with the lives and conduct of the clergy.

In 1567, shortly after his installation as Archbishop, Cipriano Pallavicino (1567–1586) held a provincial synod in order to introduce into the Statutes of the diocese canons for reform, in accordance with the decrees of the Council of Trent. These revised Statutes, which were published in 1575 and twice reissued, in 1605 and 1727, were in use for more than two centuries.

On 1 September 1588, under Cardinal Antonio Sauli (1586–1591), the Perpetual Administrator of the diocese of Genoa, a diocesan synod was held. The Cardinal ordered the rectors and curates of the churches to read one chapter of the Constitutions to the people on every feast day. Archbishop Orazio Spínola (1600–1616) held his first diocesan synod on 6 October 1604. The proceedings were published. Archbishop Domenico de' Marini (1616–1635) held his first diocesan synod on 16 February 1619. Cardinal Stefano Durazzo (1635–1664) held a diocesan synod on 21 April 1643.

A diocesan synod was also held on 6 May 1683, with Archbishop Giulio Vincentio Gentili and Pope Innocent XI taking part. A synod was also held on 11–13 September 1838.

== Bishops of Genoa ==
- Diogenes (attested 381)

[Salomone]

- Paschasius (attested 451)
- Felix
- Syrus of Genoa
- St. Remo

[Appellinus (c. 617)]
...

- Mansuetus
- Sigibertus
- Petrus (c. 864)
- Sabbatinus (attested 876, 877)

...

- Rapertus (c. 916 ?)
- Teodulfus (c. 945–after 980)
- Joannes (c. 985 – c. 993)

...

- Landulphus (1019–1034)
- Conradus
- Obertus
- Conradus Mezanello (c. 1084)
- Cyriacus (c. 1090)
- Augurius (1095–1098)
- Airaldo Guaraco (1099–1117)
- Otto (1117–1120)

Sede vacante (1120–1123)

- Sigifredus (1123–1129)
- Syrus (1130–1163)

== Archbishops of Genoa ==
- Siro de' Porcello (1133–1163)
- Ugone della Volta (1163–1188)
- Boniface (1188–1203)
- Ottone II Ghiglini (1203–1239)
- Giovanni de' Rossi (1239–1252)
- Gualtiero da Vezzano (1253–1274)
- Bernardo de' Arimondi (1276–1287)
- Opizzino Fieschi (1288–1292) Administrator
- Giacomo da Varazze (Jacopo da Varagine) (1292–1298)
- Porchetto Spinola, O.Min. (1299–1321)
- Bartolomeo de' Maroni (1321–1335)
- Dino de' Tusci (1336–1342)
- Giacomo Peloso da Santa Vittoria (1342–1349)
- Bertrando Bessaduri (1349–1358)
- Guido Scetten (1358–1368)
- Andrea della Torre (1368–1377)
- Lanfranco Sacco (1377–1381?)
- Bartolomeo de Cucurno (c. 1381–1382)
- Giacomo III Fieschi (1383–1400)
- Pileo de' Marini (1400–1429?)
- Pietro de' Giorgi (1429–1436)
- Giorgio Fieschi (1436–1439)
- Giacomo Imperiale (1439–1452)
- Paolo di Campofregoso (1453–1495)
- Cardinal Jorge da Costa (1495–1496) Administrator
- Cardinal Paolo di Campofregoso (1496–1498)
- Giovanni Maria Sforza (1498–1520)
- Innocenzo Cybo (1520–1550)
- Gerolamo Sauli (1550–1559)
- Agostino Maria Salvago. O.P. (1559–1567)
- Cipriano Pallavicino (1567–1586)
- Antonio Sauli (1586–1591) Administrator
- Alessandro Centurione (1591–1596)
- Matteo Rivarola (1596–1600)
- Orazio Spínola (20 December 1600 – 24 June 1616)
- Domenico de' Marini (1616–1635)
- Stefano Durazzo (1635–1664)
- Giambattista Spinola (1664–1681)
- Giulio Vincenzo Gentile (1681–1694)
- Giovanni Battista Spínola (1694–1705)
- Cardinal Lorenzo Fieschi (archbishop) (1705–1726)
- Nicolò Maria de' Franchi, O.P. (1726–1746)
- Giuseppe Maria Saporiti (1746–1767)
- Giovanni Lercari (1767–1802)
- Cardinal Giuseppe Spina (24 May 1802 – 13 December 1816)
- Cardinal Luigi Emmanuele Nicolo Lambruschini, B. (1819 – 26 June 1830)
- Cardinal Placido Maria Tadini, O.C.D. (28 October 1831 – 22 November 1847)
- Salvatore Magnasco (1871–1892)
- Tommaso Reggio (1892–1901)
- Edoardo Pulciano (16 November 1901 – 25 December 1911)
- Cardinal Tommaso Boggiani, O.P. (10 March 1919 – 1921)
- Cardinal Carlo Minoretti (16 January 1925 – 13 March 1938)
- Cardinal Pietro Boetto, S.J. (17 March 1938 – 31 January 1946)
- Cardinal Giuseppe Siri (14 May 1946 – 6 July 1987)
- Cardinal Giovanni Canestri (6 July 1987 – 20 April 1995)
- Cardinal Dionigi Tettamanzi (18 June 1995 – 11 July 2002), appointed Archbishop of Milan
- Cardinal Tarcisio Bertone, S.D.B. (10 December 2002 – 15 September 2006), appointed Cardinal Secretary of State
- Cardinal Angelo Bagnasco (29 August 2006 – 8 May 2020)
- Marco Tasca, OFM Conv (2020–)

== Parishes ==
Of the diocese's 278 parishes, most are in the Province of Genoa, Liguria; the rest are in the Province of Alessandria, Piedmont. For a listing of parishes by province and commune see List of parishes of the Roman Catholic Archdiocese of Genoa. In 2013, there was one priest for every 1,248 Catholics; in 2016, there was one priest of every 1,364 Catholics.

== Books ==
=== Reference works for bishops ===
- Gams, Pius Bonifatius (1873). Series episcoporum Ecclesiae catholicae: quotquot innotuerunt a beato Petro apostolo. Ratisbon: Typis et Sumptibus Georgii Josephi Manz. pp. 815–816. (Use with caution; obsolete)
- Eubel, Conradus, ed. (1913). Hierarchia catholica, Tomus 1 (second ed.). Münster: Libreria Regensbergiana. pp. 281–282. (in Latin)
- Eubel, Conradus, ed. (1914). Hierarchia catholica, Tomus 2 (second ed.). Münster: Libreria Regensbergiana. p. 167.
- Eubel, Conradus; Gulik, Guilelmus (1923). Hierarchia catholica, Tomus 3 (second ed.). Münster: Libreria Regensbergiana. p. 215.
- Gauchat, Patritius (Patrice) (1935). Hierarchia catholica IV (1592-1667). Münster: Libraria Regensbergiana. p. 207.
- Ritzler, Remigius; Sefrin, Pirminus (1952). Hierarchia catholica medii et recentis aevi V (1667-1730). Patavii: Messagero di S. Antonio. pp. 225–226.
- Ritzler, Remigius; Sefrin, Pirminus (1958). Hierarchia catholica medii et recentis aevi VI (1730-1799). Patavii: Messagero di S. Antonio. p. 241.
- Ritzler, Remigius; Sefrin, Pirminus (1968). Hierarchia Catholica medii et recentioris aevi sive summorum pontificum, S. R. E. cardinalium, ecclesiarum antistitum series... A pontificatu Pii PP. VII (1800) usque ad pontificatum Gregorii PP. XVI (1846) (in Latin). Vol. VII. Monasterii: Libr. Regensburgiana.
- Remigius Ritzler; Pirminus Sefrin (1978). Hierarchia catholica Medii et recentioris aevi... A Pontificatu PII PP. IX (1846) usque ad Pontificatum Leonis PP. XIII (1903) (in Latin). Vol. VIII. Il Messaggero di S. Antonio.
- Pięta, Zenon (2002). Hierarchia catholica medii et recentioris aevi... A pontificatu Pii PP. X (1903) usque ad pontificatum Benedictii PP. XV (1922) (in Latin). Vol. IX. Padua: Messagero di San Antonio. ISBN 978-88-250-1000-8.

=== Studies ===
- Banchero, Giuseppe (1859). Il Duomo di Genova (in Italian) (terza ed.). Genova: Tommaso Ferrando.
- Bent, James Theodore (1881). Genoa: how the Republic Rose and Fell. London: C. Kegan Paul.
- Cappelletti, Giuseppe (1857). Le chiese d'Italia della loro origine sino ai nostri giorni (in Italian). Vol. decimoterzo (13). Venezia: Giuseppe Antonelli. pp. 269–419.
- Desimoni, Cornelio (1888). "Regesti delle lettere pontificie riguardanti la Liguria". Atti della Società Ligure di Storia Patria XIX (Genova 1888), pp. 5–146. (in Italian)
- Gatti, Lucia; Pasanisi, Maria Vittoria (30 November 2015). Genova nel Medioevo: il potere vescovile e la spiritualità (in Italian). Youcanprint Self-Publishing. ISBN 9788893218108.
- Grassi, Luigi Grassi (1872). Serie dei vescovi ed arcivescovi di Genova (in Italian). Vol. Parte prima. Genova: tipogr. della Gioventú.
- Hall, Martin; Phillips, Jonathan (2016). Caffaro, Genoa and the Twelfth-Century Crusades. New York: Routledge. ISBN 978-1-317-17020-4.
- Kehr, Paul Fridolin (1914). Italia pontificia : sive, Repertorium privilegiorum et litterarum a romanis pontificibus ante annum 1598 Italiae ecclesiis, monasteriis, civitatibus singulisque personis concessorum. Vol. VI. pars ii. Berolini: Weidmann. (in Latin)
- Lanzoni, Francesco (1927). Le diocesi d'Italia dalle origini al principio del secolo VII (an. 604). Faenza: F. Lega, pp. 834–840. (in Italian)
- Manno, Antonio (1898). Bibliografia di Genova (in Italian). Torino: Libreria R. Istituto sordo-muti. p. 373.
- Semeria, Giovanni Battista (1843). Secoli cristiani della Liguria, ossia, Storia della metropolitana di Genova, delle diocesi di Sarzana, di Brugnato, Savona, Noli, Albegna e Ventimiglia (in Italian). Vol. I. Torino: Tip. Chirio e Mina.
- Tacchella, Lorenzo (1976). Il pontificato di Urbano VI a Genova (1385-1386) e l'eccidio dei cardinali (in Italian). Genoa: Tilgher. ISBN 978-88-7903-074-8.
- Ughelli, Ferdinando; Coleti, Niccolo (1719). Italia sacra, sive de episcopis Italiae et insularum adjacentium (in Latin). Vol. Tomus quartus (4) (2nd ed.). Venice: Apud Sebastianum Coleti. pp. 830–907.
- Urbani, Rossana; Zazzu, Guido Nathan (1999). The Jews in Genoa: 507-1681. Vol. I. Leiden: Brill. ISBN 90-04-11325-8.
