= Antonmaria Sauli =

Roman Catholic cardinal

His Eminence Antonmaria Sauli
- Dean of the College of Cardinals
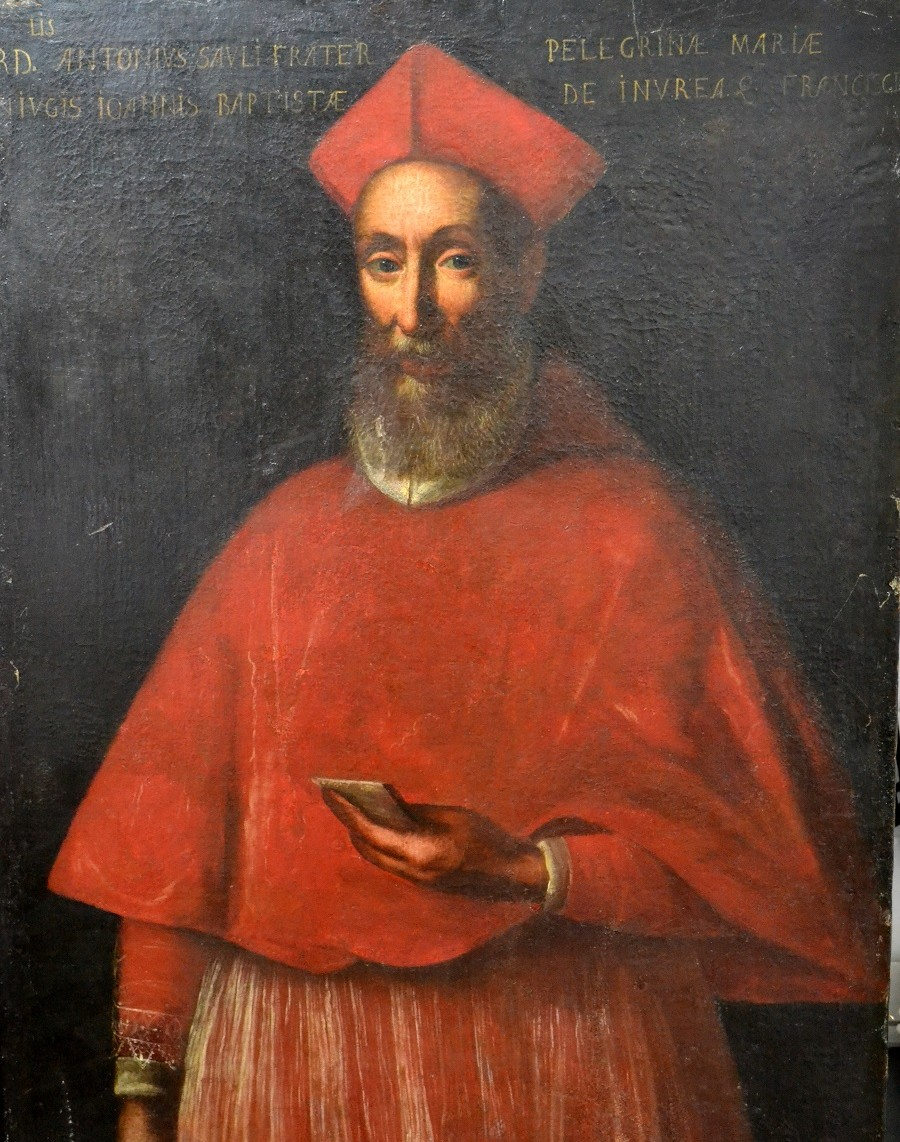
- Portrait of Cardinal Sauli, 17th century
- Church: Catholic Church
- Appointed: 6 April 1620
- Term ended: 24 August 1623
- Predecessor: Antonio Maria Gallo
- Successor: Francesco Maria del Monte
- Other posts: Cardinal-Bishop of Ostia-Velletri (1620-1623)
- Previous posts: See list: Apostolic Nuncio to Naples (1572–1577); Archbishop of Genoa (1586-1591); Cardinal-Priest of San Vitale (1588-1591); Cardinal-Priest of Santo Stefano al Monte Celio (1591-1603); Cardinal-Priest of Santa Maria in Trastevere (1603-1607); Cardinal-Bishop of Albano (1607-1611); Cardinal-Bishop of Sabina (1611-1615); Cardinal-Bishop of Porto-Santa Rufina (1615-1620)

Orders
- Consecration: 24 February 1586 by Domenico Pinelli
- Created cardinal: 18 December 1587 by Pope Sixtus V
- Rank: Cardinal-Bishop

Personal details
- Born: Antonio Maria Sauli; 1541 Genoa, Republic of Genoa
- Died: 24 August 1623 (aged 81–82) Rome, Papal States

Antonio Maria Sauli (sometimes Antonio Sauli) (1541–1623) was the Archbishop of Genoa and later a Roman Catholic Cardinal, serving as the dean of the College of Cardinals for the last three years of his life.

== Early life ==
He was born in Genoa in 1541 to Ottaviano Sauli and Giustiniana. The Sauli were a patrician family that gave the Republic of Genoa three doges and the Church eight bishops. Uncle of Cardinal Alfonso Visconti and Cardinal Giovanni Girolamo Lomellini. Another cardinal of the family was Bandinello Sauli. His name also appears as Antony and as Mark Antony.

He studied at the Universities of Bologna and Padua, where he obtained a doctorate in law.

As a young man he served the Republic in various positions, and then moved to Rome, where he was able to become referendary of the Supreme Tribunal of the Apostolic Signatura of Justice and Grace during the pontificate of Pope Pius IV (1559-1565). He was then apostolic nuncio in Naples from 9 November 1572 to 15 October 1577, and then extraordinary nuncio to Portugal from 1579 to 1580.

== Bishop ==
He was elected titular bishop of Philadelphia of Arabia and appointed coadjutor with right of succession to the archbishop of Genoa on 27 November 1585. The consecration took place on Monday, February 24, 1586 in the Sistine Chapel in Rome, by the laying on of hands by Cardinal Domenico Pinelli, co-consecrating the bishop of Lucca, Alessandro Guidiccioni, and Giovanni Francesco Mazza Canobius, bishop of Forlì. He succeeded Cipriano Pallavicino as Genoa in 1586, but resigned before 9 August 1591.

He was legate a latere for the affairs of the League in 1587.

== Cardinal ==
Pope Sixtus V elevated him to the rank of cardinal in the consistory of December 18, 1587, and he received the title of San Vitale on January 15, 1588.

He changed various cardinal titles:

- On 14 January 1591 he opted for the title of Santo Stefano al Monte Celio.
- Then for that of Santa Maria in Trastevere on February 19, 1603.
- He became cardinal bishop with the title of the suburbicarian see of Albano on 7 February 1607.
- From there it passed to the suburbicarian see of Sabina on 17 August 1611
- He then occupied the suburbicarian see of Porto and Santa Rufina from 6 September 1615. After this he became vice dean of the College of Cardinals.
- On 6 April 1620 it received the suburbicarian see of Ostia and Velletri.

He became Dean of the College of Cardinals in 1620, succeeding the late Cardinal Antonio Maria Gallo.

With Cardinal Ludovico Ludovisi he was co-prefect of the Congregation of Propaganda Fide, established by Pope Gregory XV on 22 June 1622, a position he held until 12 November of the same year.

== Death ==
He died in Rome on 24 August 1623 and was buried in the church of Santa Maria del Popolo. His remains were then transferred to Genoa and placed in the tomb of the Sauli family.

== Conclaves ==
During his period as cardinal Antonio Maria Sauli participated in the conclaves

- conclave of September 1590, which elected Pope Urban VII
- conclave of October-December 1590, which elected Pope Gregory XIV
- conclave of 1591, which elected Pope Innocent IX
- conclave of 1592, which elected Pope Clement VIII
- conclave of March 1605, which elected Pope Leo XI
- conclave of May 1605, which elected Pope Paul V
- conclave of 1621, which elected Pope Gregory XV
- conclave of 1623, which elected Pope Urban VIII

== Episcopal succession ==
Episcopal succession of Antonmaria Sauli

While bishop, he was the principal consecrator of:

- Alessandro Centurione, Archbishop of Genoa (1591);
- Antonio Maria Graziani, Bishop of Amelia (1592);
- Matteo Rivarola, Archbishop of Genoa (1596);
- Marcello Lorenzi, Bishop of Strongoli (1600);
- Jerónimo Bernardo de Quirós, Bishop of Castellammare di Stabia (1601);
- Berlinghiero Gessi, Bishop of Rimini (1606);
- Giovanni Sauli (Scali, Sacchi), Bishop of Aleria (1609); and
- Bernardo Giustiniano, Bishop of Anglona-Tursi (1609).

== External links and additional sources ==
- Cheney, David M. "Nunciature to Naples". Catholic-Hierarchy.org. (for Chronology of Bishops) ^{[self-published]}
- Cheney, David M. "Archdiocese of Genova {Genoa}". Catholic-Hierarchy.org. (for Chronology of Bishops) ^{[self-published]}
- Chow, Gabriel. "Metropolitan Archdiocese of Genova (Italy)". GCatholic.org. (for Chronology of Bishops) ^{[self-published]}

Records
Preceded by Ladislao d'Aquino	Oldest living Member of the Sacred College; 26 March 1620 - 12 February 1621	Succeeded by Domenico Ginnasi
