= Stefano Durazzo =

Italian Catholic cardinal and archbishop

His Eminence Stefano Durazzo
- Cardinal, Archbishop of Genoa
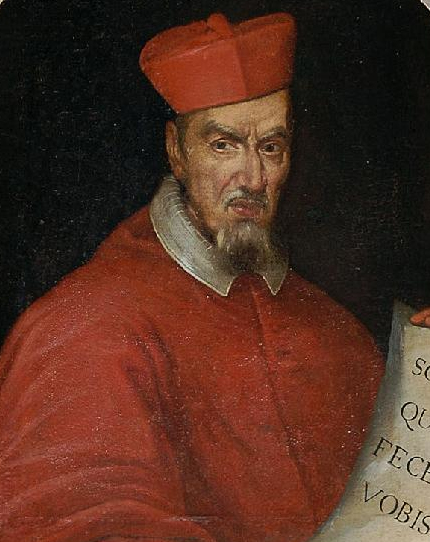
- Church: Catholic Church
- See: Archbishop of Genoa
- Appointed: March 5, 1635
- Term ended: October 1664
- Predecessor: Domenico de' Marini
- Successor: Giambattista Spinola

Orders
- Consecration: April 22, 1635 (Bishop) by Lorenzo Magalotti
- Created cardinal: November 28, 1633

Personal details
- Born: August 5, 1594 Multedo, Genoa, Republic of Genoa
- Died: July 11, 1667 (aged 72) Rome, Papal States

Stefano Durazzo (1594 – 1667) was an Italian Catholic cardinal and archbishop of Genoa.

== Early life ==
Durazzo was born 5 August 1594 in Multedo, near Genoa, the seventh son of Pietro Durazzo and Aurelia Saluzzo. He belonged to the Durazzo family, one of new emerging families of the Republic of Genoa which had entered on the corporation (albergo) of the House of Grimaldi. His grandfather Giacomo had been Doge of Genoa from 1573 to 1575. Also his father Pietro was Doge from 1619 to 1621, as well as his brother Cesare (from 1665 to 1667) and his nephew Pietro (from 1685-1687). Another of his nephews, Marcello Durazzo, became a cardinal in 1686.

Stefano Durazzo was destined to the ecclesiastic life and he was sent to Rome in 1611. In 1618, he was ordained priest and he completed his studies earning a doctorate in utroque iure on about 1620.

Durazzo took up a career in the administration of the Papal States: in 1621, he became referendary of the Tribunals of the Apostolic Signature thanks to the support of the seven cardinals of the Republic of Genoa. He purchased the title of clerk of the Apostolic Chamber in 1623, and in 1624, he became Prefect of the Annona with the responsibility for the grain supply to the city of Rome, a duty he accomplished with success during a period of famine organizing shipments of grain from Sicily.

In 1627, Durazzo became treasurer-general of the Apostolic Chamber in 1627 and held that position until 1633, before being appointed pro-secretary of the Apostolic Chamber in 1634.

== Cardinal ==
Stefano Durazzo was created cardinal Priest on 28 November 1633 with the title of San Lorenzo in Panisperna. On 11 October 1666, he gained the title of San Lorenzo in Lucina.

On May 1634, he was appointed Papal legate (governor) of Ferrara. His government of Ferrara had not particular issues: he renewed the sewage pipes of the town, built a channel and a fortification in Comacchio and used 4000 ecus of him to buy grain during a famine: such money was given for the town as a loan not as charity. He had a conflict with the bishop of the town Cardinal Lorenzo Magalotti over some rights on the church of San Lorenzo.

During his stay in Ferrara, on 5 March 1635, Durazzo was appointed Archbishop of Genoa. The Episcopal consecration followed on 22 April in the Cathedral of Ferrara by the hands of Cardinal Lorenzo Magalotti. He was requested to remain in Ferrara and he left for Genoa only on 22 October 1637.

His government of the Archdiocese of Genoa was from the very beginning marked by his conflicts with the aristocracy, represented by the Senate of the Republic, and also with a large portion of the clergy . In particular Durazzo opposed the claim of the Doge to receive regal honors, disputed with the Senate over the control of hospitals, and ordered to the clergy the mandatory use of clerical clothing.

His main achievement as archbishop was the founding of the seminary. To support such institution he ordered a particular tax on the revenues of the ecclesiastic benefices which made him unpopular among the clergy. He also ordered that the admission to the seminary was to be decided by the Church only without any interference by the Senate. Durazzo also conducted mercantile business in addition to his ecclesiastic work. Another important reason of his conflict with the ancient aristocracy of the town was his subtle pro-France attitude, which he shared with Pope Urban VIII, who made him cardinal, and with the Barberini family.

Between June 1640 and November 1642, he was appointed Legate in Bologna which he ruled with his usual authoritative way of acting. During the First War of Castro he closed the doors of Bologna and did not attack the army of Odoardo Farnese, saving the town but actually opposing the Barberini and the pope.

Returned in Genoa, he celebrated a synod in April 1643 which resulted in a turn of the screw against the laxity of the clergy. In 1645 was reached an agreement with the Senate over the main issue of etiquette, but the conflicts continued and became stronger and stronger. The Senate asked many times to the Pope to remove Durazzo, who moved to Rome from 1659 to 1661, and again from 1662. In October 1664, Stefano Durazzo finally resigned as Archbishop of Genoa.

Durazzo participated in the conclave of 1644 which elected Pope Innocent X, the conclave of 1655 which elected Pope Alexander VII and the conclave of 1667 which elected Pope Clement IX. He died in Rome on 11 July 1667 and was buried in the church of S. Maria in Monterone. His remains were later transferred to Genoa.
