= Tornioli =

Tornioli is a surname. Notable people with the surname include:

- Evangelista Tornioli (1570–1630), Italian Roman Catholic bishop
- Niccolò Tornioli, Italian painter
