= Palazzo Spada =

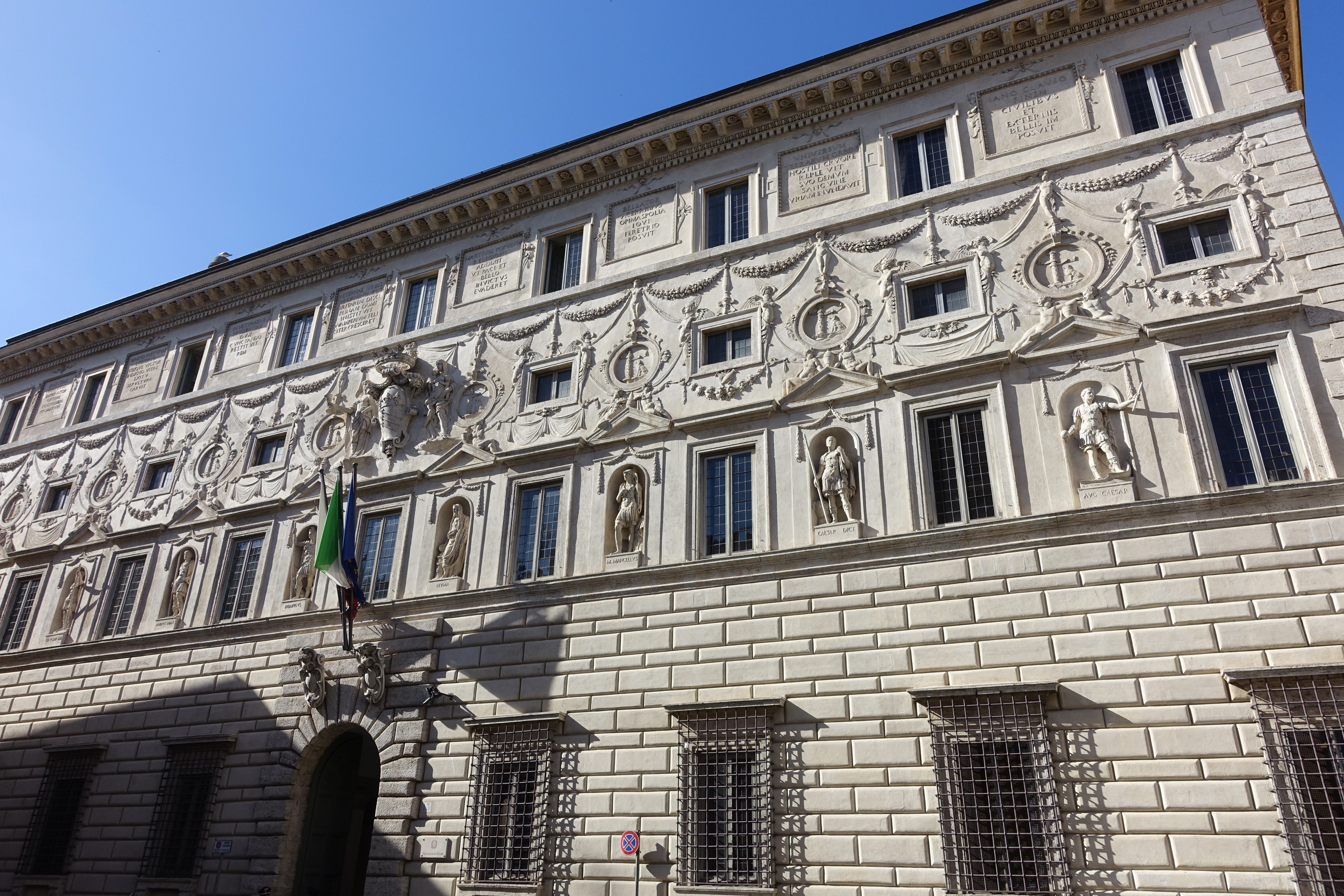
- Facade of the Palazzo Spada.
- Click on the map for a fullscreen view

General information
- Location: Piazza di Capo Ferro #13, Rome, Italy
- Coordinates: 41°53′38.5″N 12°28′18.5″E

The Palazzo Spada is a palace located on Piazza di Capo Ferro #13 in the rione Regola of Rome, Italy. Standing very close to the Palazzo Farnese, it has a garden facing towards the Tiber river.

The palace accommodates a large art collection, the Galleria Spada. The collection was originally assembled by Cardinal Bernardino Spada in the 17th century, and by his brother Virgilio Spada, and added to by his grandnephew Cardinal Fabrizio Spada,

== History ==
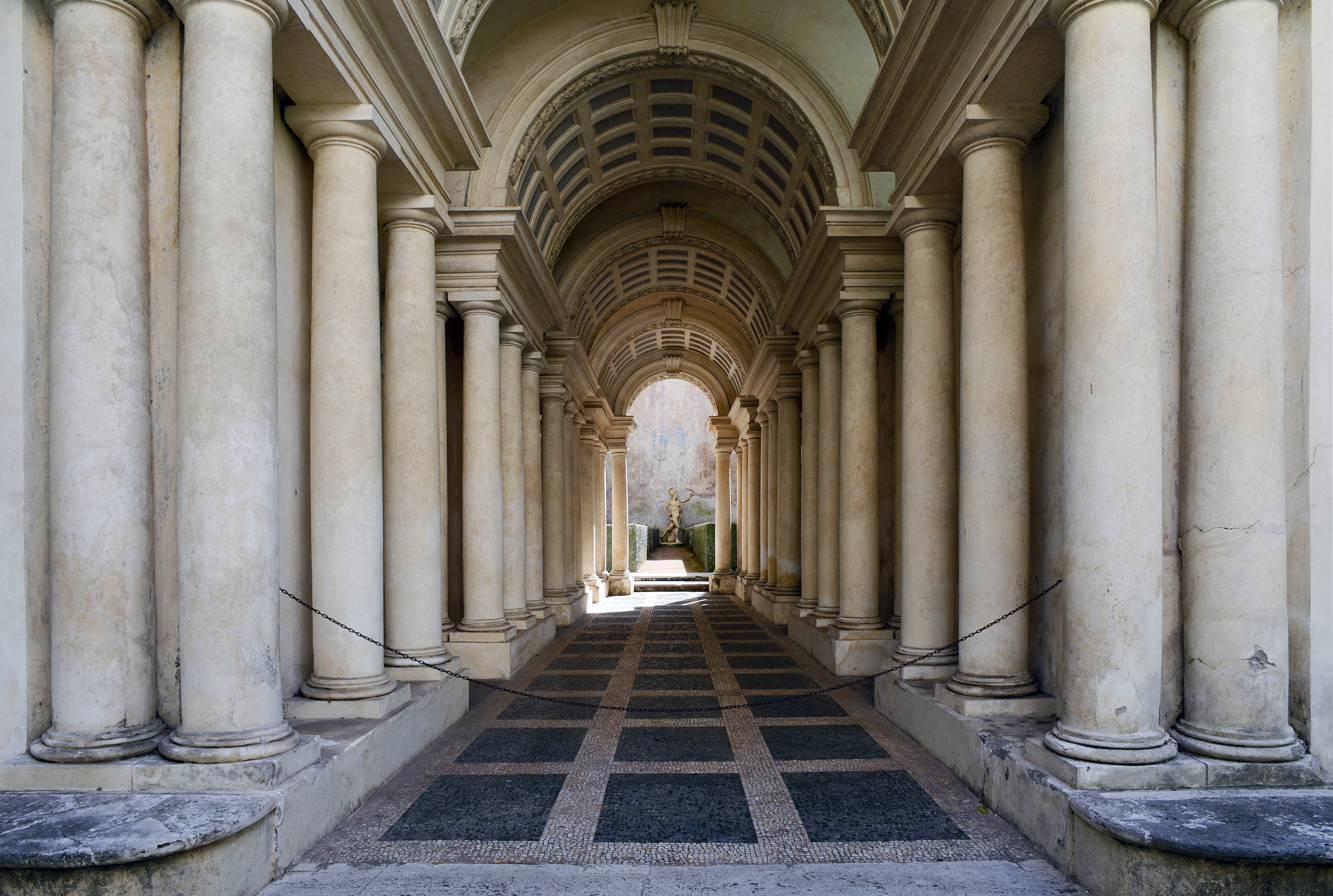
Forced perspective gallery by Francesco Borromini. The corridor is much shorter, and the sculpture much smaller, than they appear.

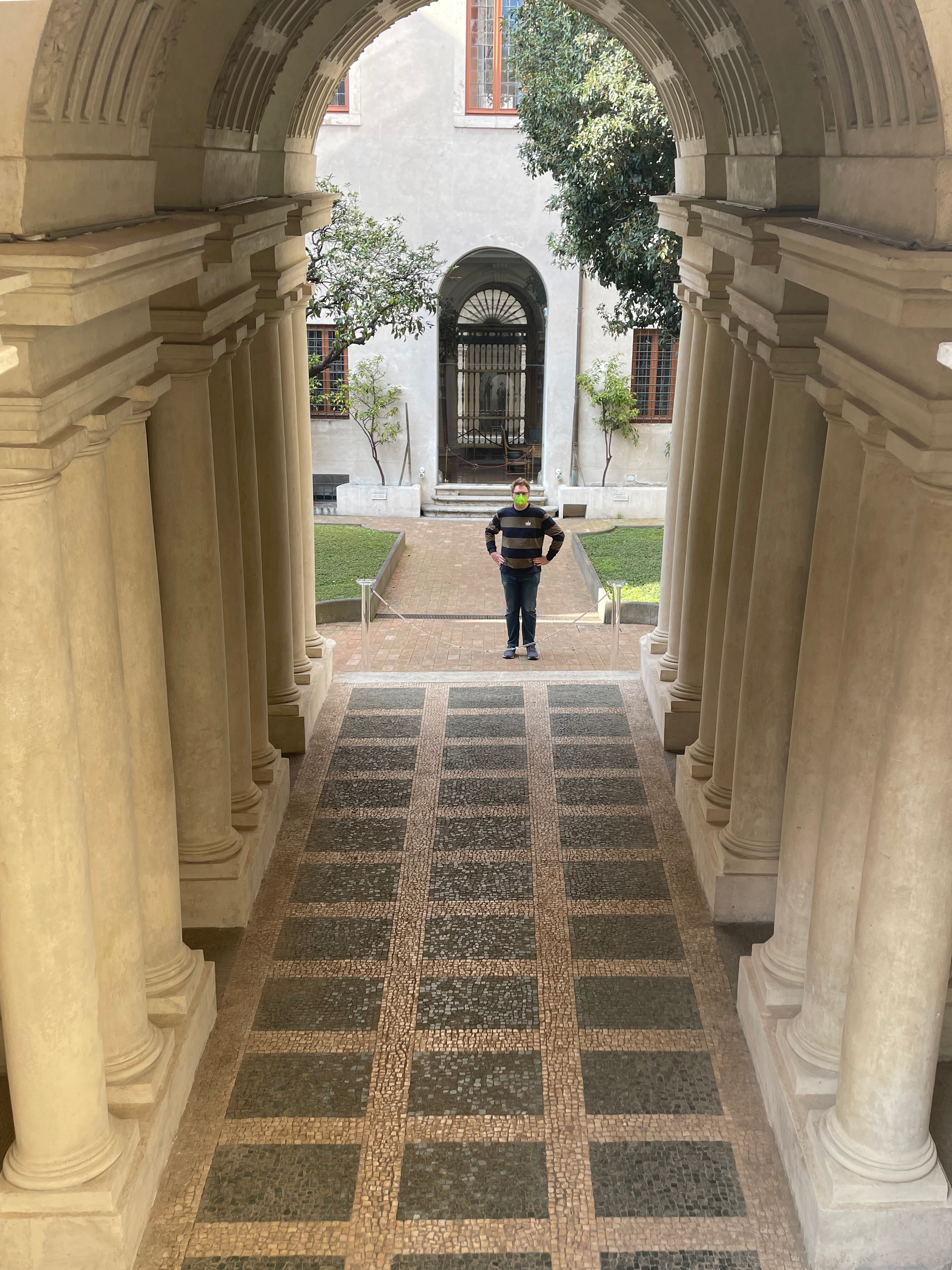
View through Borromini's gallery to the courtyard. The illusory effect is reversed, and the viewer becomes like a giant.

In 1540, the palace was commissioned by Cardinal Girolamo Capodiferro, and utilized as an architect Bartolomeo Baronino of Casale Monferrato, while Giulio Mazzoni and a team provided lavish external and internal stucco-work.

The palace was briefly owned by the Mignanelli family, until in 1632, the palace was purchased by Cardinal Spada, who commissioned modifications from Francesco Borromini. The Baroque architect Borromini who created a masterpiece of forced perspective optical illusion in the arcaded courtyard, in which diminishing rows of columns and a rising floor create the visual illusion of a gallery 37 meters long (it is 8 meters) with a life-size sculpture at the end of the vista, in daylight beyond: the sculpture is 60 cm high. Borromini was aided in his perspective trick by a mathematician.

The Mannerist stucco sculptural decor of the palazzo's front and its courtyard façades feature sculptures crowded into niches and fruit and flower swags, grotesques and vignettes of symbolic devices (impresi) in bas-relief among the small framed windows of a mezzanine, the richest Cinquecento façades in Rome.

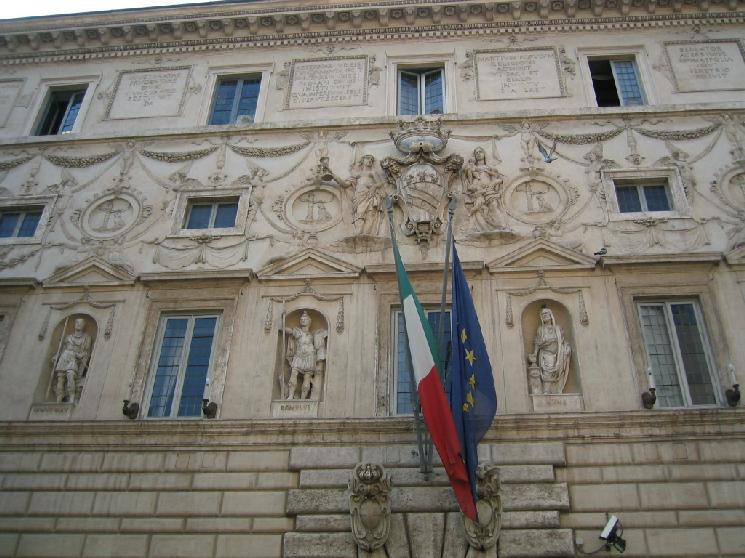
Facade details.

The colossal sculpture of Pompey the Great, erroneously believed to be the very one at whose feet Julius Caesar fell, was discovered under the party wall of two Roman houses in 1552: it was to be decapitated to satisfy the claims of both parties, which appalled Cardinal Capodiferro so, that he interceded on the sculpture's behalf with Pope Julius III, who purchased it and then gave it to the Cardinal.

== Gallery ==
The palazzo hosts the Galleria Spada, the Cardinal Spada's collection, which includes four galleries of 16th and 17th-century paintings by Andrea del Sarto, Niccolò Tornioli, Guido Reni, Titian, Jan Brueghel the Elder, Guercino, Rubens, Dürer, Caravaggio, Domenichino, the Carracci, Salvator Rosa, Parmigianino, Francesco Solimena, Michelangelo Cerquozzi, Pietro Testa, Giambattista Gaulli, and Orazio and Artemisia Gentileschi, and has the additional interest of being hung in the 17th-century manner, frame-to-frame, with smaller pictures "skied" above larger ones.

== Public authority ==
Palazzo Spada was purchased by the Italian State in 1927 and today houses the Italian Council of State, which meets in its richly frescoed and stuccoed rooms.

Preceded by Palazzo Ruspoli, Rome	Landmarks of Rome; Palazzo Spada	Succeeded by Palazzo Valentini
