= Galleria Spada =

Museum in Rome, Italy

Galleria Spada Museum
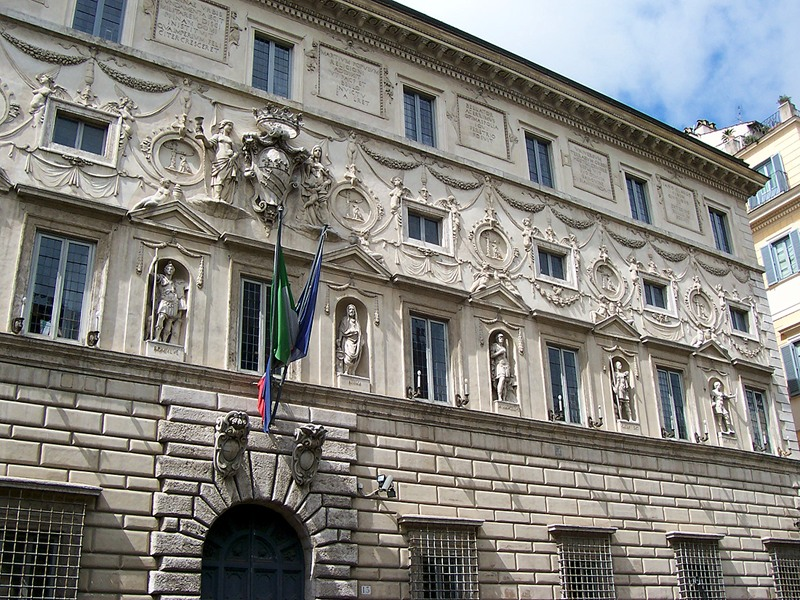
- Click on the map for a fullscreen view
- Established: 1927
- Location: Piazza Capo di Ferro, 13, Rome
- Website: www.galleriaspada.beniculturali.it

The Galleria Spada is a museum in Rome, which is housed in the Palazzo Spada on Piazza Capo di Ferro. The palazzo is also famous for its façade and for the forced perspective gallery by Francesco Borromini.

The gallery exhibits paintings from the 16th and 17th centuries. A state museum, it is managed by the Polo Museale del Lazio.

== History ==
The building now housing the Galleria Spada was originally built in 1540 for Cardinal Girolamo Capodiferro. Bartolomeo Baronino, of Casale Monferrato, was the architect, while Giulio Mazzoni and a team provided lavish stuccowork inside and out. The palazzo was purchased by Cardinal Spada in 1632. He commissioned the Baroque architect Francesco Borromini to modify it for him, and it was Borromini who created the masterpiece of forced perspective optical illusion in the arcaded courtyard, in which diminishing rows of columns and a rising floor create the visual illusion of a gallery 37 meters long (it is 8 meters) with a lifesize sculpture at the end of the vista, in daylight beyond; the sculpture is 60 cm high. Borromini was aided in his perspective trick by a mathematician.

The building was purchased in November 1926 by the Italian State to house the gallery and the State Council. The Galleria was opened in 1927 in the Palazzo Spada. It closed during the 1940s, but reopened in 1951 thanks to the efforts of the Conservator of the Galleries of Rome, Achille Bertini Calosso and the Director, Federico Zeri. Zeri was committed to locating the remaining artwork that had been scattered during the war, as he intended to recreate the original layout of the 16th–17th version of the gallery, including the placement of the pictures, the furniture and the sculptures. Most of the exhibited artwork comes predominantly from the private collection of Bernardino Spada, supplemented by smaller collections such as that of Virgilio Spada.

== Description ==
The museum is located on the first floor of Palazzo Spada, in the wing that used to belong to Cardinal Girolamo Capodiferro. The Cardinal had built the museum over the historical remains of his family's former home that had been established in 1548.

Room I

The room is called the Room of the Popes because of its fifty inscriptions describing the lives of select pontiffs, as commissioned by Cardinal Bernardino. It is also known as the Room with the Azure Ceiling because the ceiling is covered with a turquoise canvas divided into many little compartments marked "camerini da verno" (the local dialect camerini da verno is translated in Italian as camerini di inverno, 'winter cabins' in English). The ceiling coffers' decorations date back to 1777.

Among the paintings in this room are:

- Portrait of Cardinal Bernardino Spada (1631) by Guido Reni
- Portrait of Cardinal Bernardino Spada (1631) by Guercino
- Portrait of Cardinal Fabrizio Spada (1643–1717) (1754) by Sebastiano Ceccarini
- Two Still Lifes (1714) by Onofrio Loth
- Four Ovidian mythological scenes by Giuseppe Bartolomeo Chiari
  - Apollo and Daphne
  - Latona curses the Lycians transforming them into Frogs
  - Mercury entrusts Bacchus to the Nymphs
  - Bacchus and Ariadne
- Four vedute (landscapes) by Hendrik van Lint
- Four battle scenes by Jacques Courtois

Room II
This room was created along with Room III. The upper part of the walls were decorated with friezes in tempera on canvas by Perino del Vaga. The other parts of the walls that were originally painted with paneling are now missing.

Among the works in this room are:

- Fresco frieze (1542) by Perino del Vaga, now replaced by friezes (1635) by Andrea Gennaroli and (1636) by François Perrier
- Road to Calvary (c. 1500) by Marco Palmezzano
- Portrait of a Botanist, Nobleman, and King David (1570) by Bartolomeo Passerotti
- Portrait of a Violinist (c. 1515) by Titian
- Four Stories of the Old Testament by Andrea Donducci
- Some Madonnas (16th century) by the Umbrian School
- The Visitation by Andrea del Sarto
- Portrait of Pope Julius III (c. 1550) by Girolamo Siciolante da Sermoneta
- Saint Cristopher and Saint Luke (c. 1510) by Amico Aspertini

Room III
This room is called the "Gallery of the Cardinal". It was designed by Paolo Maruscelli in 1636 and 1637, together with Room II, to house the art collection of Bernardino Spada. The ceiling is beamed and French windows lead into galleries, one of which has an iron railing overlooking the large garden.

Among the paintings here are:

- Frescoes depicting Allegories of the Four Continents, Elements, and Seasons; Trophies and Armor; scenes from Ovid's Metamorphoses in Frieze (1698–1699) by Michelangelo Ricciolini
- Allegory of Architecture, Sculpture and Painting offering gifts to Minerva, protector of Arts also by Ricciolini
- Landscape with Deer-hunt (1550–1560) by Niccolò dell'Abate
- Vestals (1670) by Ciro Ferri
- Landscapes with Windmills (1607) by Jan Brueghel the Elder
- The Kidnapping of Helen copy of original by Guido Reni, painted by Giacinto Campana
- The Meeting of Mark Antony and Cleopatra (1702) by Francesco Trevisani
- The Massacre of the Innocents and The Sacrifice of Iphiginea (circa 1640) by Pietro Testa
- The Astronomers (1645) by Niccolò Tornioli
- Triumph of the Name of Jesus (c. 1679), a sketch for the ceiling of the Gesù by Giovanni Battista Gaulli
- The Death of Dido (1631) by Guercino

Room IV
This final room was built over a wooden gallery overlooking the large garden. It houses paintings by the Caravaggisti.

== Artworks ==
The most important artworks are:

- Michelangelo Cerquozzi: The Revolt of Masaniello
- Giovan Battista Gaulli (Baciccia): Christ and the Samaritan
- Artemisia Gentileschi: Saint Cecilia; The Virgin and Child
- Orazio Gentileschi: David with the Head of Goliath
- Guercino: Portrait of Cardinal Bernardino Spada
- Giovanni Lanfranco: Cain and Abel
- Giovanni Andrea Donducci (Mastelletta): Tales
- Parmigianino (school): Three Heads
- Mattia Preti: Christ Tempted by Satan; Christ and the Woman Taken in Adultery
- Guido Reni: Portrait of Cardinal Bernardino Spada; Saint Jerome
- Pieter van Laer (il Bamboccio): Storm; Nocturne

Furthermore, work by:

- Peter Paul Rubens
- Albrecht Dürer
- Caravaggio
- Domenichino
- Annibale Carracci
- Salvator Rosa
- Francesco Solimena

The Heaven Globe and the Earth Globe, dating back to the first decades of 18th century, made by the Dutch cartographer Willem Blaeu, are also interesting highlights of the museum.

== Gallery ==
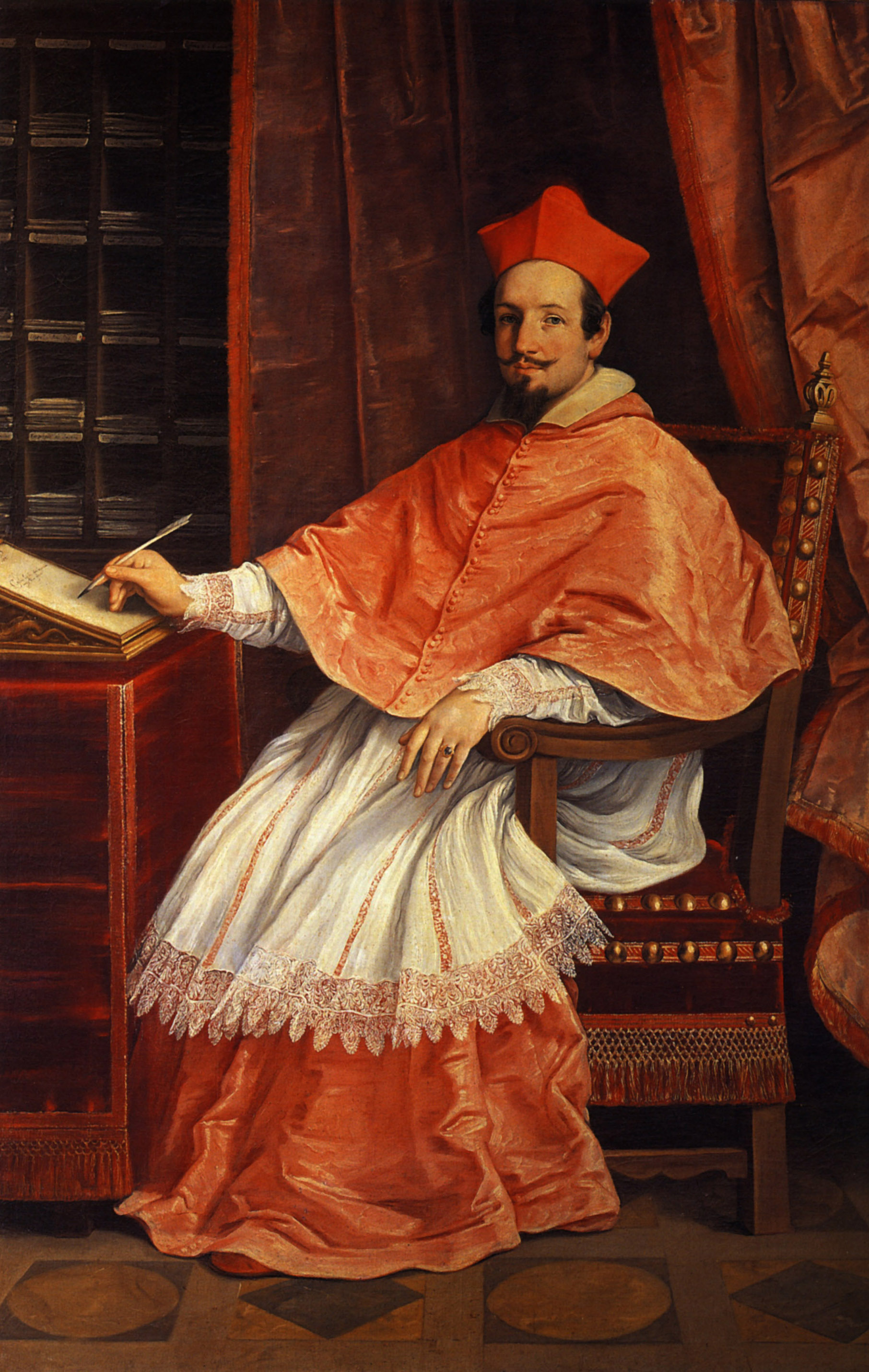
Guido Reni, Portrait of Cardinal Bernardino Spada

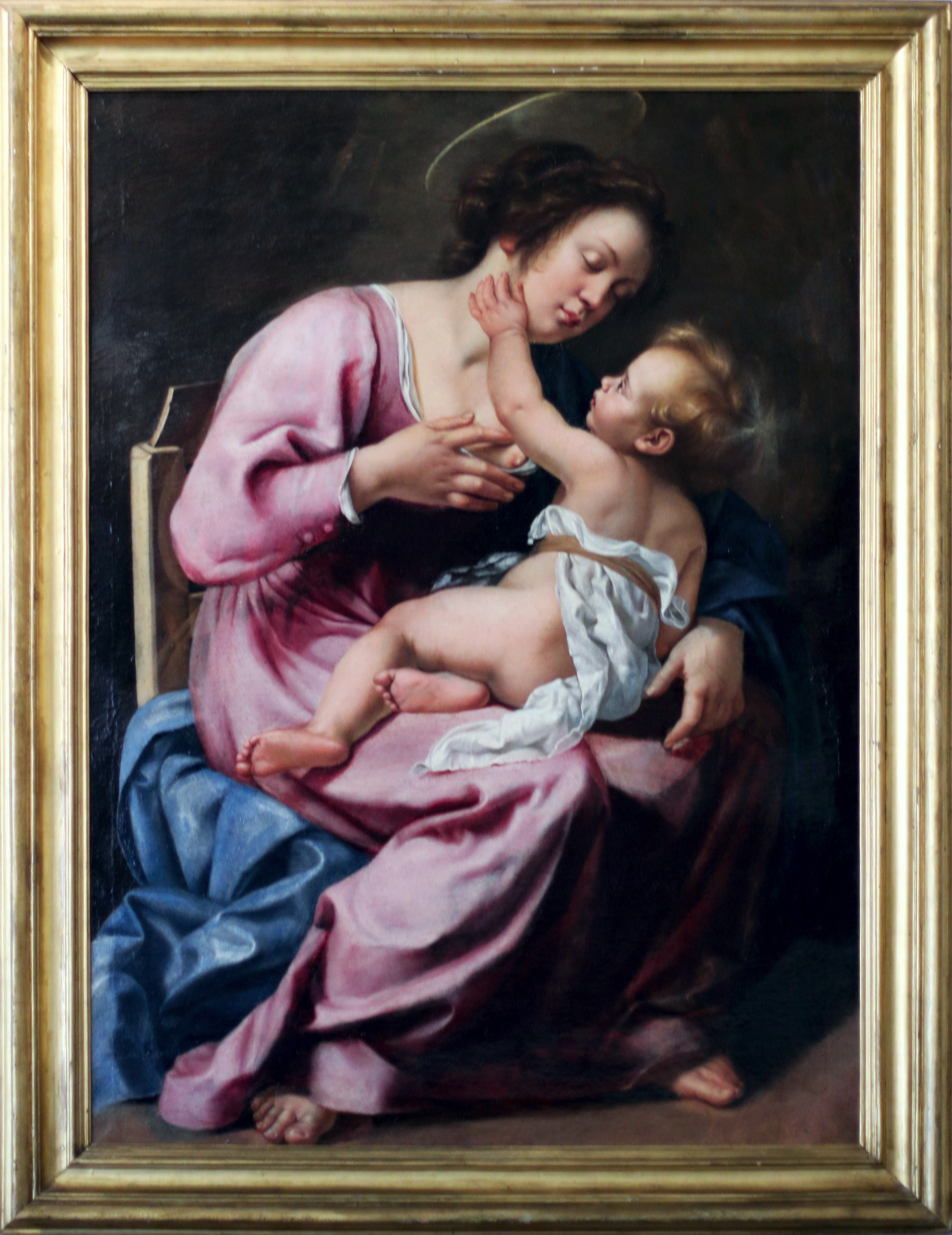
Artemisia Gentileschi, The Virgin and Child

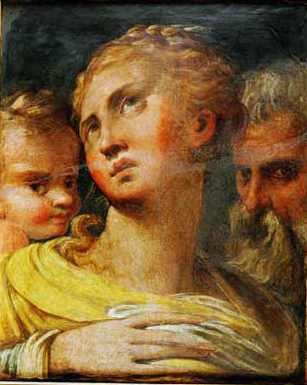
Parmigianino, Three Heads

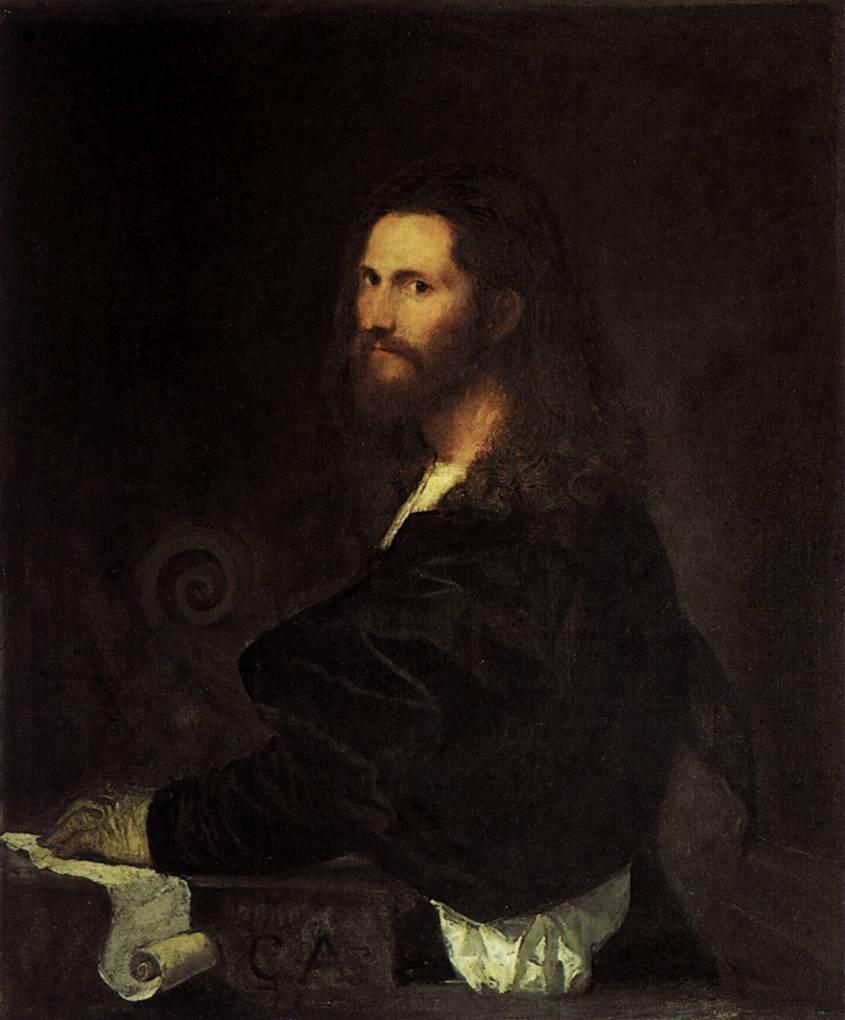
Titian, Portrait of a Musician

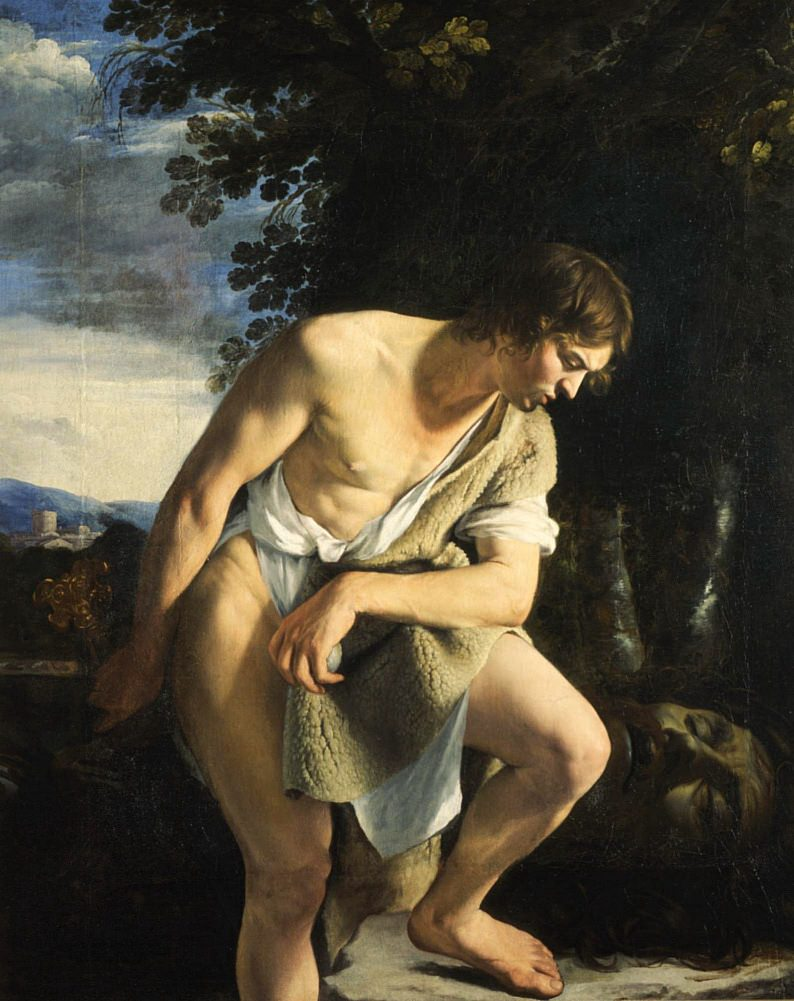
Orazio Gentileschi, David Contemplating the Head of Goliath

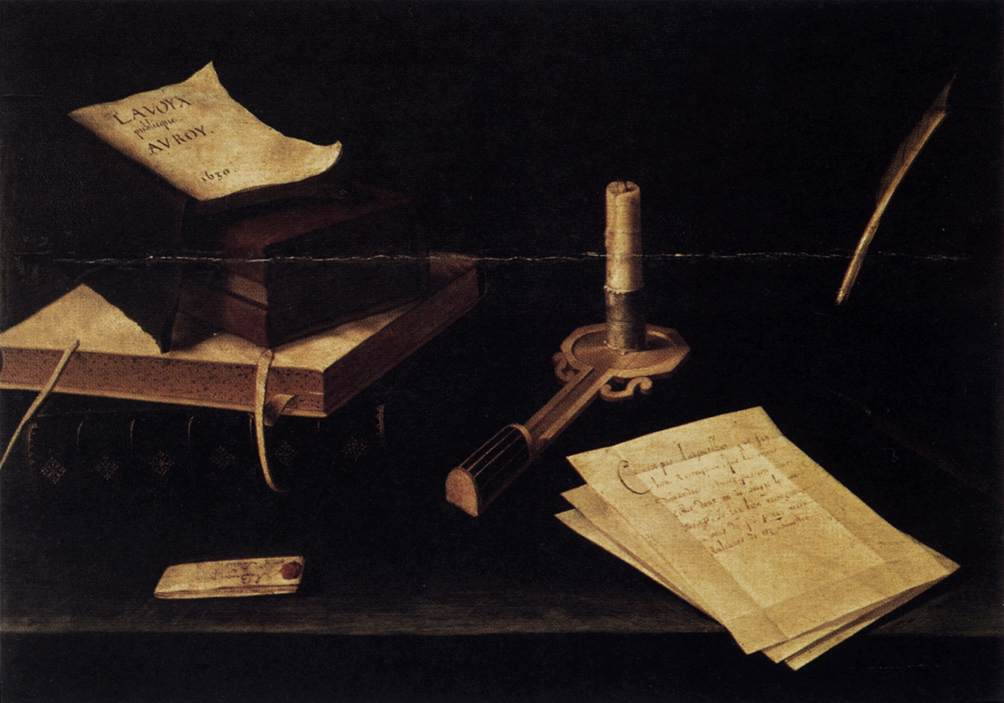
Lubin Baugin, Still-Life with Candle

== See also ==
- List of museums in Italy
- Palazzo Spada

Preceded by Giorgio de Chirico House Museum	Landmarks of Rome; Galleria Spada	Succeeded by Jewish Museum of Rome
