= Giorgio de Chirico House Museum =

House museum in Rome, Italy

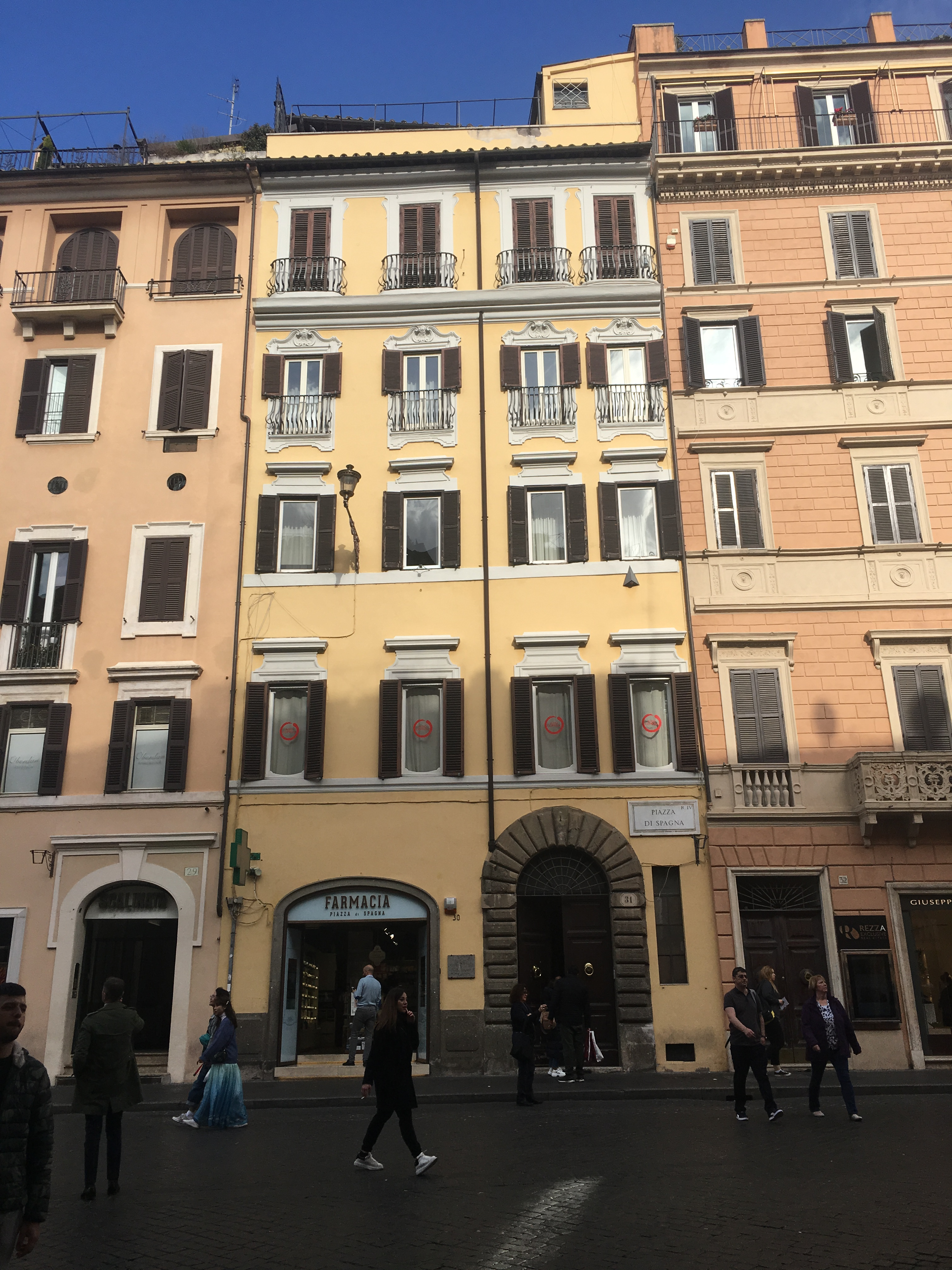
- Giorgio de Chirico House Museum, exterior view, March 2019
- Click on the map for a fullscreen view
- Coordinates: 41°54′20″N 12°28′57″E

The Giorgio de Chirico House Museum (Casa Museo Giorgio de Chirico) is a house museum in the 16th century Palazzetto del Borgognoni at Piazza di Spagna 31 in Rome. The house was acquired by Giorgio de Chirico in 1948. It was left to the state by his widow and opened as an art museum dedicated to his work in 1998. Only open by appointment, it is open on Mondays, Thursdays, Fridays, Saturdays, and the last Sunday of the month. The nearest Metro stop is Spagna.

== Exhibits ==
It houses numerous works belonging to the Giorgio e Isa de Chirico Foundation, mostly executed by the artist during the last 30 years of his life, including:

- Donna in riposo, 1936
- Ritratto di Isa con testa di Minerva, 1944
- Bagnanti, 1945
- Autoritratto di De Chirico, 1953
- Naiadi al bagno, 1955
- Triangolo metafisico, 1958
- Due cavalli in riva al mare, 1964
- Interno metafisico con nudo anatomico, 1968
- Riposo del Gladiatore, 1968
- Interno metafisico con biscotti, 1968
- Il rimorso di Oreste, 1969
- Orfeo trovatore stanco, 1970
- Il meditatore, 1971
- Sole su cavalletto, 1972
- Frutta con busto di Apollo, 1973
- Bagni misteriosi, 1973
- L'anniversario del principe, 1973
- Le maschere, 1973
- Pianto d'amore (Ettore e Andromaca), 1974

== See also ==
- List of single-artist museums

== Notes ==
Preceded by Galleria Nazionale d'Arte Moderna	Landmarks of Rome; Giorgio de Chirico House Museum	Succeeded by Galleria Spada
