= Pietro Testa =

Italian artist (1611–1650)

- Self-portrait, c. 1647-48, Amsterdam, Rijksmuseum
- Born: 1612; Lucca, Republic of Lucca
- Died: 1 March 1650 (aged 37–38); Rome, Papal States
- Education: Domenichino; Pietro da Cortona
- Known for: Painting; Printmaking
- Movement: Baroque

Pietro Testa (1612 – 1 March 1650) was an Italian High Baroque artist active in Rome. He is best known as a printmaker and draftsman. Most of his relatively brief career was spent in Rome in the circle of artists and scholars interested in Classical ideals, who grouped around Cassiano dal Pozzo. Although his public paintings were largely unsuccessful, he was among the finest and most renowned Italian printmakers and draughtsmen of the 17th century.

== Early career: Lucca and Rome, to 1637 ==
The son of a dealer in secondhand goods in Lucca, by the mid- to late 1620s Testa was in Rome, where he was known as ‘il Lucchesino’. The German painter and artists’ biographer Joachim von Sandrart, who was then in Rome supervising the project to engrave the ancient statues in the collection of Vincenzo Giustiniani (published c. 1631 as Galleria Giustiniani), claimed to have discovered Testa drawing among the ancient ruins of the city and put him to work making preparatory drawings for the Giustiniani engravings. An inventory of 1638 also indicates that Giustiniani owned two paintings by Testa: Moses Striking the Rock and Laban Searching for the Idols Concealed by Rachel (both Potsdam, Sanssouci Picture Gallery).

By 1630 Testa was working in the studio of Domenichino. At this time he also made drawings of antiquities – filling five large volumes, according to Baldinucci – for dal Pozzo’s Museum Chartaceum (Paper Museum; hundreds preserved at Windsor Castle, Royal Library), and it was from the abilities he displayed in this commission that Testa earned a reputation and the appellation ‘il Lucchesino esquesito disegnatore’ (‘little Lucchese, the exquisite draughtsman’).

The many surviving drawings for his own inventions attest both to his skill and to the laborious mode of production learnt from Domenichino. Both the Giustiniani and dal Pozzo projects gave Testa an important early grounding in the works of Classical antiquity. His earliest prints (techniques for which he would have learnt from the excellent printmakers on the Giustiniani project) date from this period, including an engraved Elephant (1630, possibly recalling a lost painting by Testa owned by dal Pozzo) and the etched Three Lucchese Saints Interceding with the Virgin for the Victims of the Plague (c. 1630–31).

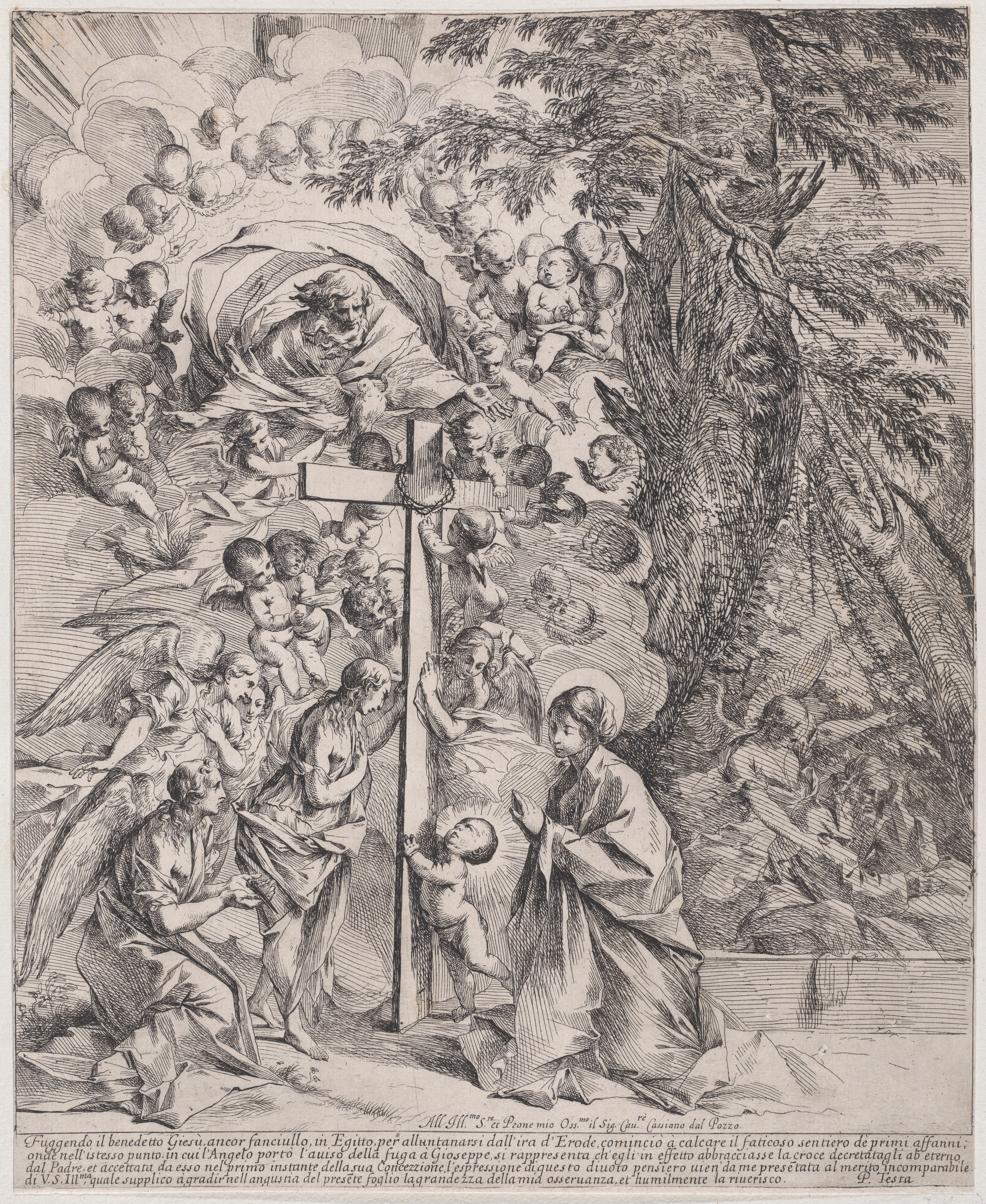
Dream of Joseph or Flight into Egypt with the Adoration of the Cross (c. 1635–7), Metropolitan Museum of Art, New York

Testa’s friendship with dal Pozzo, to whom Testa dedicated his allegorical etching of the Dream of Joseph or Flight into Egypt with the Adoration of the Cross (c. 1635–7), continued for some years, although the fact that dal Pozzo had Testa jailed in 1637 on the suspicion that he was about to leave Rome without delivering two promised paintings suggests that the relationship had cooled. Through Sandrart, dal Pozzo and Domenichino, Testa gained entry into a group of artists that included Nicolas Poussin, François Duquesnoy, Claude Lorrain and Gaspard Dughet, as well as the critic Giovanni Pietro Bellori; they shared and stimulated his interest in the Classical tradition, a thoughtful union of artistic practice and theory, and landscape. The notion advanced by several scholars that Testa’s theoretical classicism, acquired under the tutelage of dal Pozzo and others, was at odds with and suppressed a naturally romantic temperament to the disadvantage of his art and career has been justly rejected.

When Domenichino moved to Naples in mid- 1631, Testa entered Pietro da Cortona’s studio, probably with an introduction from dal Pozzo, as Passeri stated, and possibly enamoured of Cortona’s colourism, as suggested by Baldinucci. Testa’s difficult personality – noted by all his biographers – caused a rupture with Cortona, who threw him out of the studio. Testa subsequently returned to Lucca (before August 1632), invited to paint a fresco of Liberty in the Palazzo degli Anziani (Palazzo Pubblico), but he had no experience in the medium, and the work was not well received. He did, however, secure the patronage of the Lucchese collector Girolamo Buonvisi, cleric of the Apostolic Camera and a member of the circle around the family of the Barberini pope Urban VIII in Rome. Testa dedicated several prints to Buonvisi, including the Lyceum of Painting (c. 1638).

He returned to Rome (probably by the end of 1632), vowing, according to Passeri, to study and excel in colouring as he had in drawing so that his work might be properly appreciated by his compatriots. There he spent the rest of his life, apart from a brief sojourn in Lucca in 1637. In addition to the two Giustiniani paintings, several canvases can be dated to the mid-1630s, including the altarpiece of the Vision of St. Dominic of Soriano (c. 1636–7) in the church of San Romano, Lucca. The influence of Poussin, significant throughout Testa’s career, is evident in works from the 1630s such as the Venus and Adonis (c. 1631–7), of which there is both an etched and a painted version (Vienna, Gemäldegalerie der Akademie der bildenden Künste). The image recalls Poussin’s own treatment of the subject from the late 1620s, in both style and iconography. Its mood is gentle and lyrical; the emphasis on landscape and the dozens of putti surrounding the amorous protagonists have led some to see it as part of a general ‘neo-Venetianism’ of the 1630s, although this concept remains problematic. The reversal of life and death in the figures of Adonis and the boar carries cosmological overtones (as discovered by Cropper) and is symptomatic of Testa’s tendency, throughout his career, to embellish narratives or inventively rework conventional subjects, for which he was criticized by some of his contemporaries.

In late 1637 Testa returned to Lucca, where his friend Pier Francesco Mola drew a dated portrait of him (Montpellier, Musée Fabre). Testa probably hoped to gain the patronage of the new bishop, Cardinal Marco Antonio Franciotti, whose arrival he celebrated in an allegorical etching and to whom he dedicated one other etching as well, the Allegory of Painting (c. 1637–8). However, Franciotti’s appointment proved disastrous; he was removed as bishop in 1639, and Testa’s renewed hopes for a powerful Lucchese patron were dashed.

== Final Roman period, 1637–50 ==
Testa returned to Rome after a very brief sojourn in Lucca, and his imagery underwent a gradual transformation. Perhaps following the path of Poussin, with a renewed look at the style of Domenichino and of Annibale Carracci’s Roman works, Testa in his later etchings and paintings employed a more severe, monumental style, anticipating the Neoclassical style, with themes from ancient history generally replacing the poetic mythologies, as in the etched Suicide of Cato (1648).

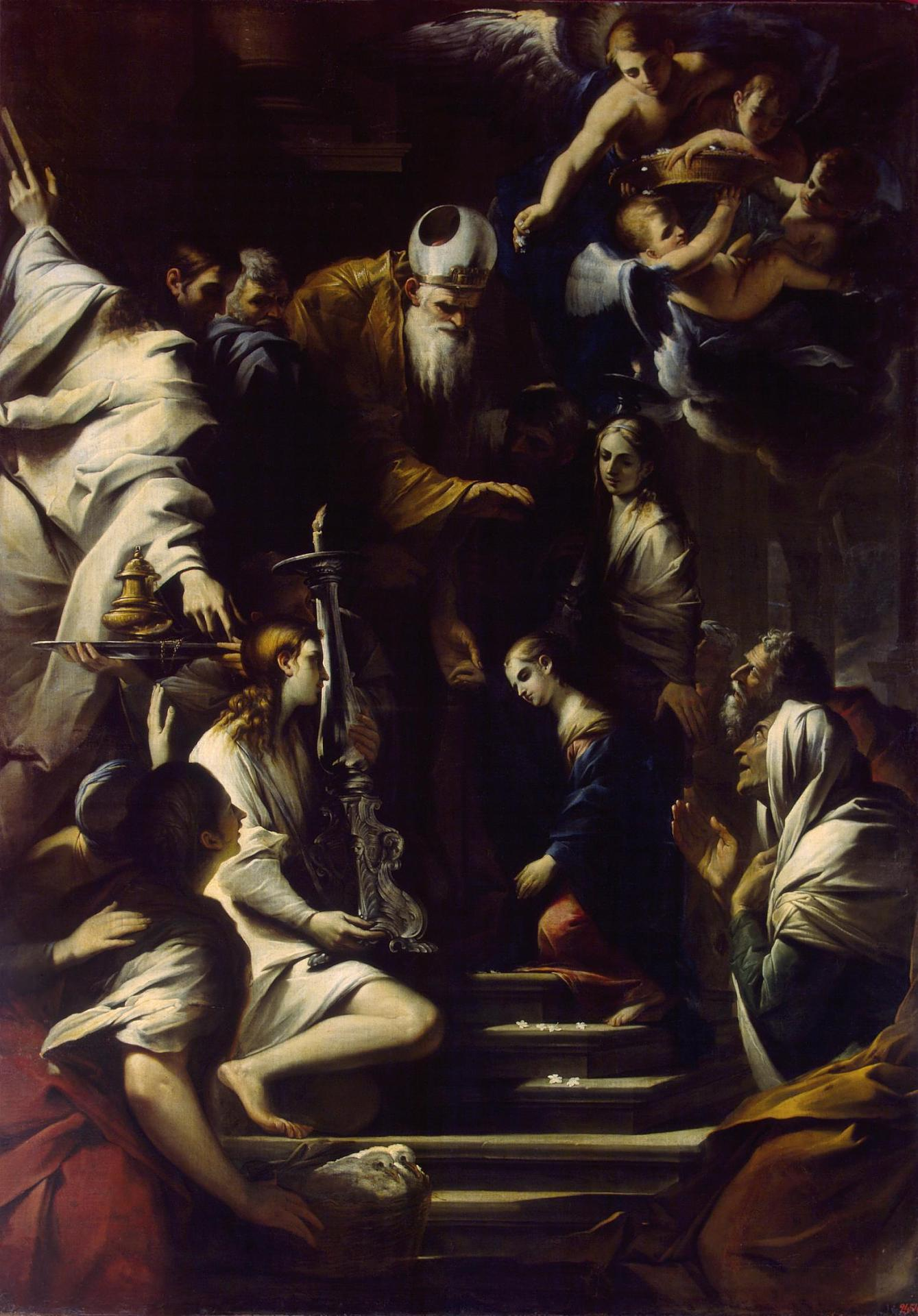
Presentation of the Virgin in the Temple, Saint Petersburg, Hermitage Museum

Several paintings are datable to the 1640s, for patrons both in Lucca and in Rome, including the Adoration of the Shepherds (Edinburgh, Scottish National Gallery) and the Presentation of the Virgin in the Temple, painted for Santa Croce e San Bonaventura alla Pilotta in Rome (now Saint Petersburg, Hermitage Museum), frescoes in Santa Maria dell’Anima, Rome (c. 1642), and the Miracle of St. Theodore (c. 1644–5), an altarpiece in Santi Paolino e Donato, Lucca. Testa’s only securely documented painting from the last five years of his life is also his most ambitious one: the Vision of St. Angelus of Jerusalem (c. 1645–6) in San Martino ai Monti, Rome. This altarpiece was commissioned by the Carmelite prior of the church, Giovanni Antonio Filippini, who also engaged Testa to decorate the apse in time for the Holy Year celebrations in 1650. Testa worked too slowly to satisfy Filippini, who by 1647 or 1648 withdrew the commission.

At about the same time it was determined that Testa’s frescoes in Santa Maria dell’Anima would be replaced with work by Jan Miel, a northern artist with little training in fresco painting, further frustrating Testa’s ambitions as a painter. According to both Passeri and Baldinucci, Testa was much more skilled in drawing, etching and in invention than in painting, leading him to devote himself more fully to printmaking, clearly evident from the late 1630s onwards. As early as the mid-1630s, many of Testa’s inventions appeared in both painted and etched versions.

Throughout the 1630s and 1640s Testa produced etchings of religious, historical, mythological and allegorical subjects, of which the more complex in meaning and ambitious in scale (five of the horizontal etchings are over 700 mm wide) generally date from the later 1630s and 1640s. It was through the sale of these etchings, as well as through work for dal Pozzo, that Testa supported himself. Between 1638 and 1644, Testa completed what is perhaps his most important work, a set of complex and highly detailed etchings on the theme of The Seasons, which served as an expression of his interest in Platonic philosophy. Sympathetic contemporaries considered these his "finest and most important works." His later etchings include three series of the four etchings of the Prodigal Son (c. 1645) and the incomplete Life of Achilles (begun shortly before his death).

Testa was influenced by Leonardo da Vinci to favor direct observation of natural phenomena, a fact that may have limited his productivity as an artist and might even have caused his death. Accounts of Testa's death are confused and contradictory, some suggesting murder or suicide. Testa was described as melancholic in temperament; his difficult personality caused problematic dealings with his patrons such as Niccolò Simonelli, and a series of projects had ended in frustration. Yet his earliest biographer, the 17th-century author Filippo Baldinucci, indicates that the death was accidental. Commenting on Testa's habit of "depicting night scenes and changes in the atmosphere and in the sky," Baldinucci states that Testa was standing on a Tiber riverbank, "drawing and observing some reflections of the rainbow in the water," when he fell in and drowned.

== Theoretical work ==
Testa was sophisticated in his artistic theory, in which he remained true to the principles of Domenichino and the Carracci tradition, rejecting, on one hand, the verism of, in Testa’s words, such ‘dirty and ridiculous apes of nature’ as the Dutch Italianates and, on the other, the Baroque illusionism of Lanfranco. (His dislike of the latter can be inferred from Passeri’s statement that in his unexecuted Paradise for the apse of San Martino ai Monti Testa intended to depart from the ‘stupid’, if common, practice initiated by Correggio of showing the serenity of the heavens disturbed by clouds.) As Passeri noted, although Testa may have been inadequately educated for the role, he was greatly given to philosophy, which contributed both to his retiring and independent nature – Sandrart called him a ‘shy Stoic’ – and to his profoundly conceptual approach to his work.

Probably after his final return to Rome from Lucca in 1637, Testa began writing a treatise on painting, provisionally entitled Trattato della pittura ideale (‘Treatise on ideal painting’), to be dedicated to Buonvisi, but it was never completed and exists only as a collection of notes, gathered after his death with a group of his drawings (Düsseldorf, Museum Kunstpalast). Some of the notes record Testa’s reflections on writers on art such as Leon Battista Alberti, Giovanni Battista Armenini, Gian Paolo Lomazzo and Vitruvius, as well as ancient authors such as Aristotle, Euclid, Plato and Xenophon. The ideas on artistic practice and theory that are evident in fragmentary form in the notes (analysed most extensively by Cropper 1984) also found expression in his etchings of the late 1630s and 1640s, especially the Lyceum of Painting, the Triumph of the Virtuous Artist on Parnassus (c. 1642) and the series of the Four Seasons (c. 1642–4).

== Critical assessment and legacy ==
Testa's etchings, which often include work in drypoint, have a fantastic quality reminiscent of Jacques Callot, or embellishments of his Genoese contemporary Giovanni Benedetto Castiglione and even presciently suggest William Blake. His Sacrifice of Iphigenia appears to have influenced Tiepolo's rendition at Villa Valmarana ai Nani in Vicenza. His early prints, from the 1630s, were often religious and were influenced by Federico Barocci. These achieve very delicate effects of light; his later ones became harder and more austere in style, as he attempted a personal version of Neoclassicism, under the influence of the Carracci. Many of his later subjects were original classical subjects, the most ambitious reflecting his personal struggles. His prints were successful and frequently copied.

== Gallery ==
Paintings

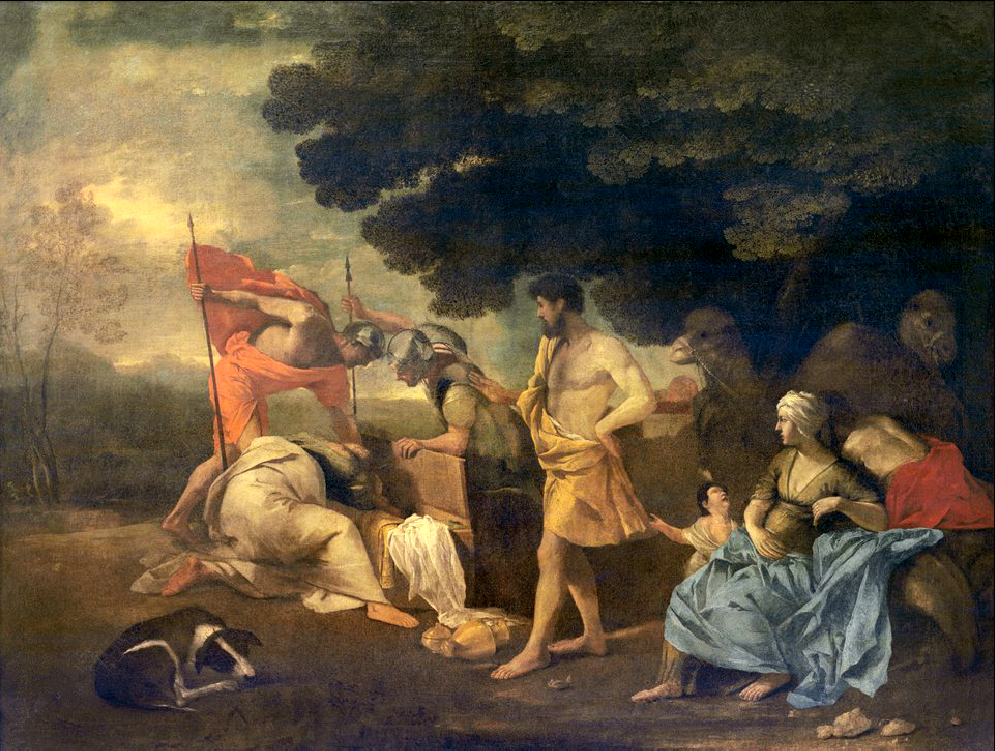
Rachel hides the idols from Laban, c. 1630, oil on canvas, Sanssouci Picture Gallery, Potsdam

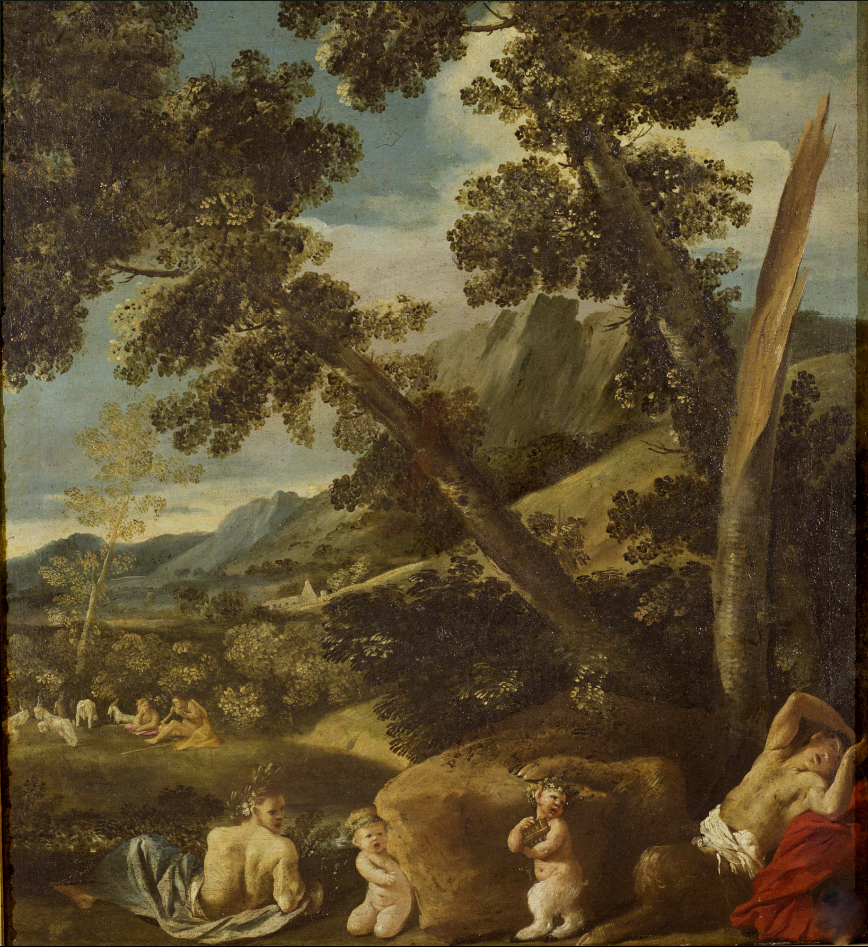
Landscape with Satyrs, c. 1630, oil on canvas, Galleria Corsini, Rome

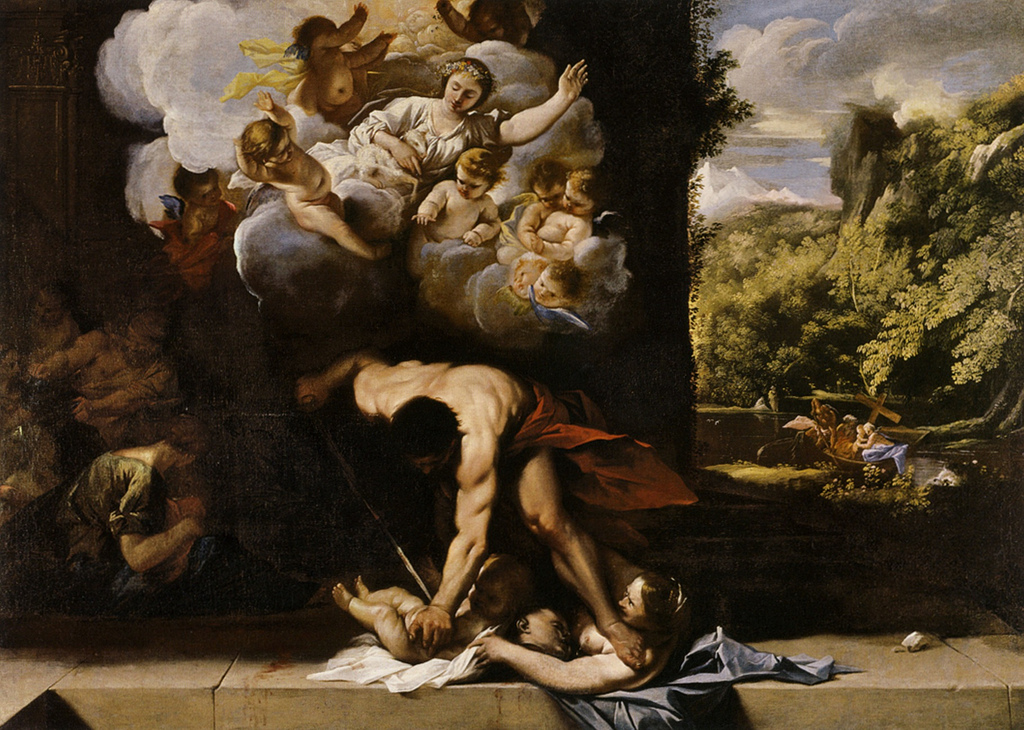
Allegory of the Massacre of the Innocents, oil on canvas, Galleria Spada, Rome

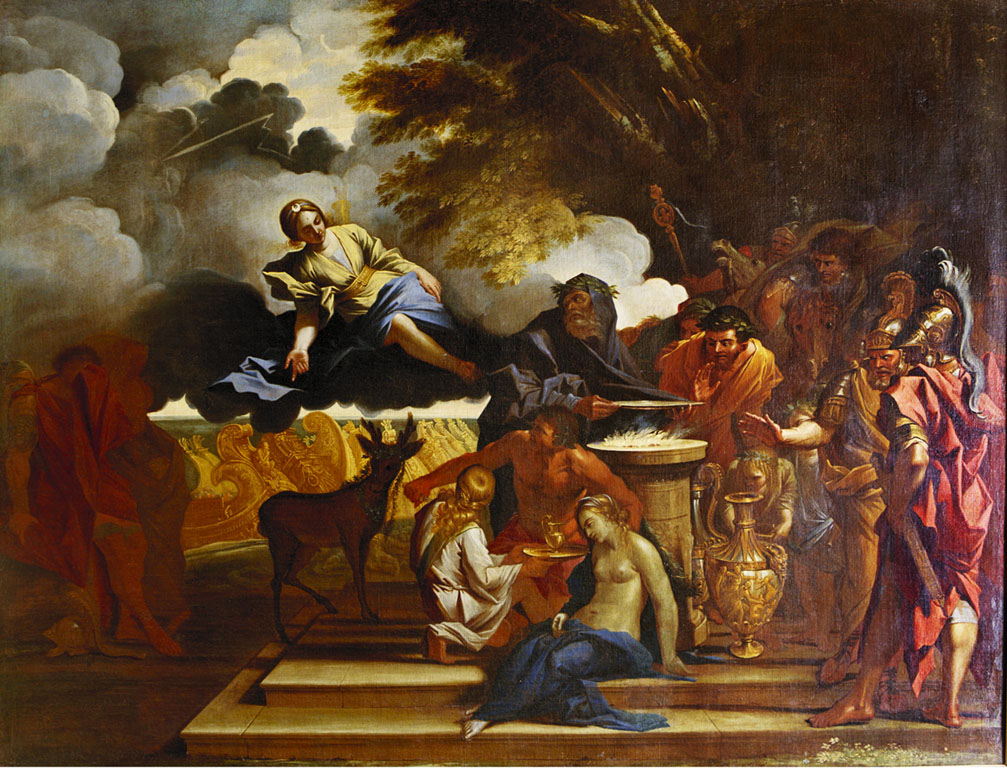
Sacrifice of Iphigenia, c. 1640, Galleria Spada, Rome

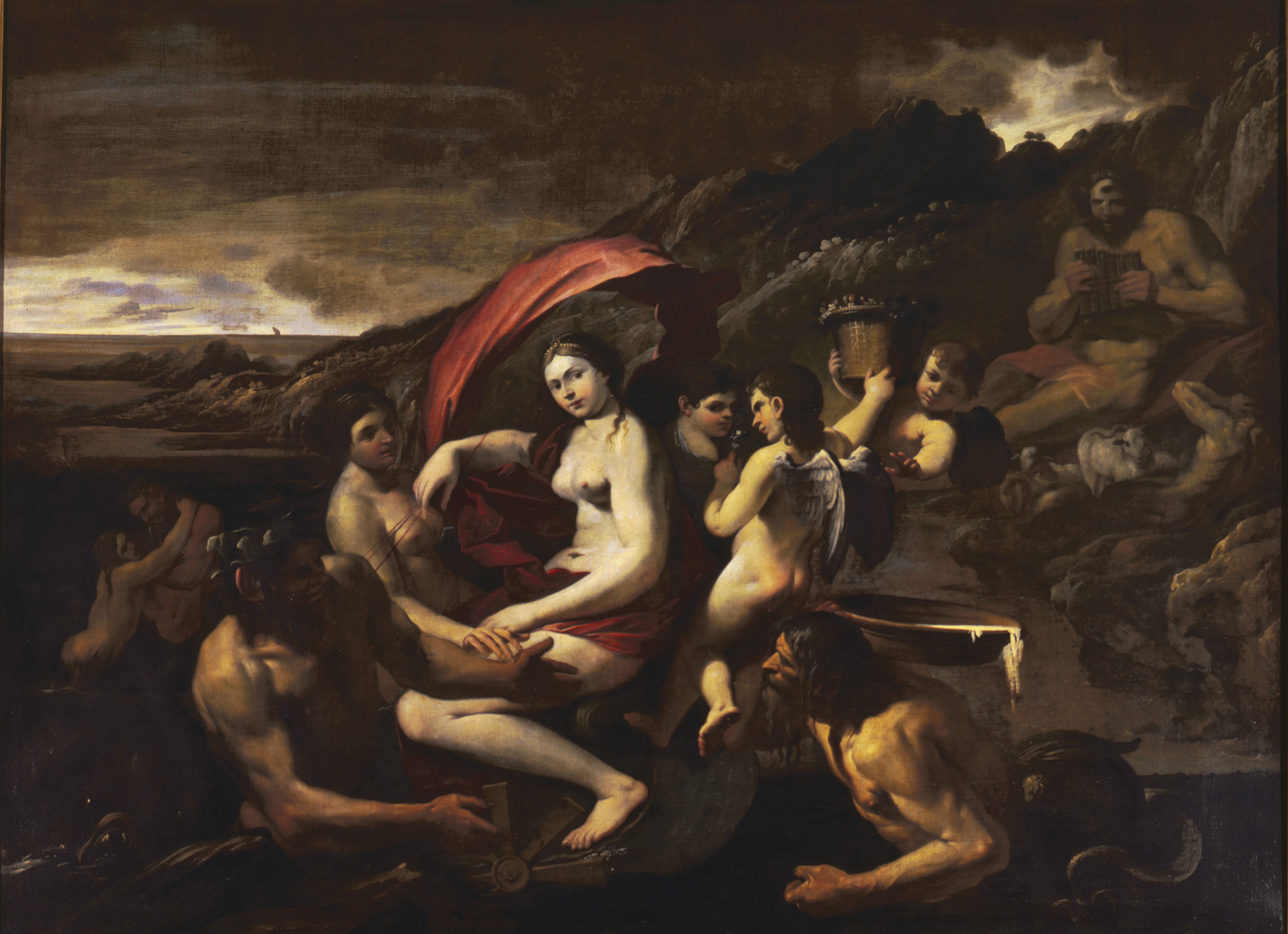
Triumph of Galatea, c. 1637, oil on canvas, Museo Nazionale di Palazzo Mansi, Lucca

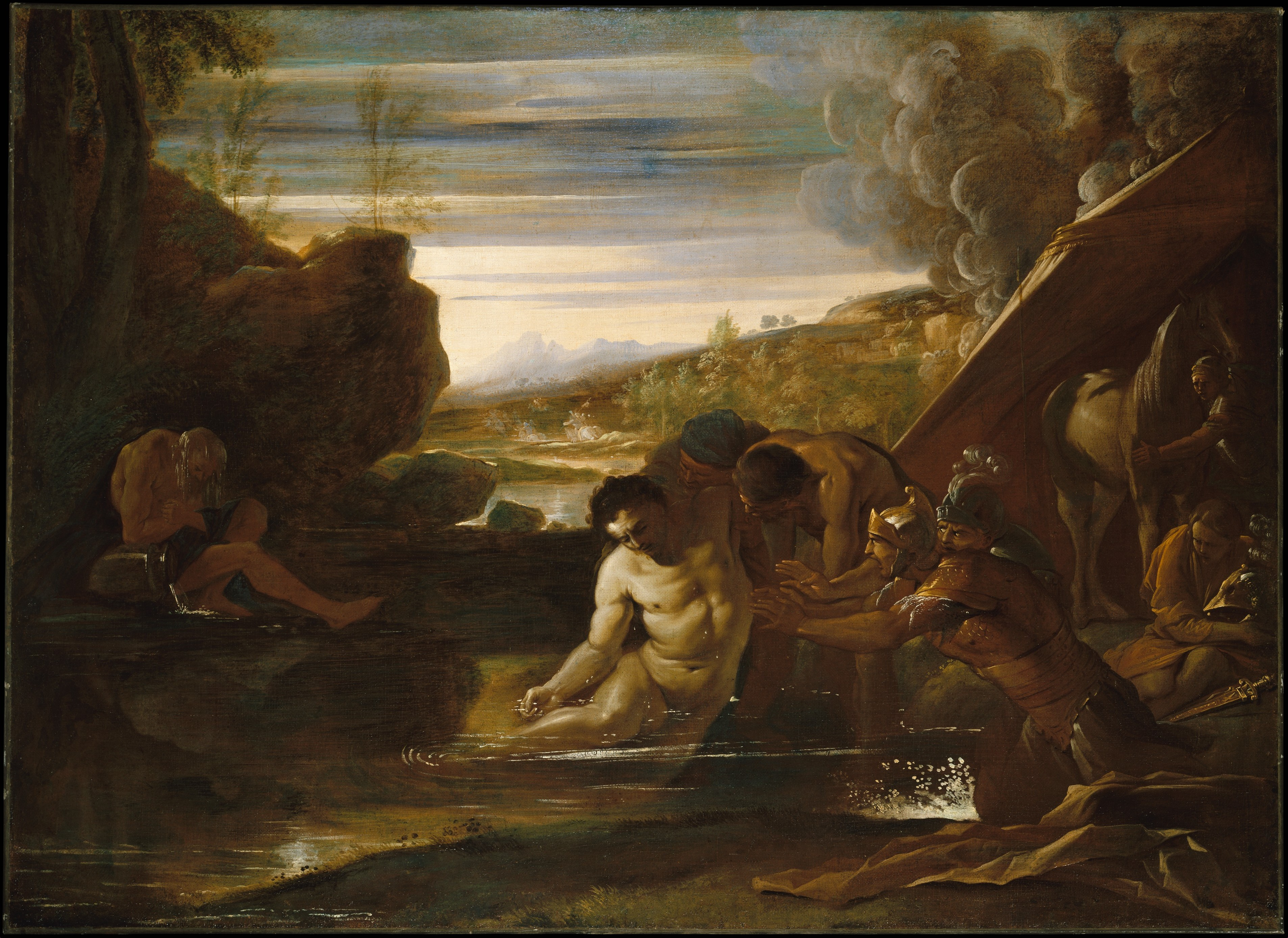
Alexander the Great Rescued from the River Cydnus, c. 1650, oil on canvas, Metropolitan Museum of Art, New York

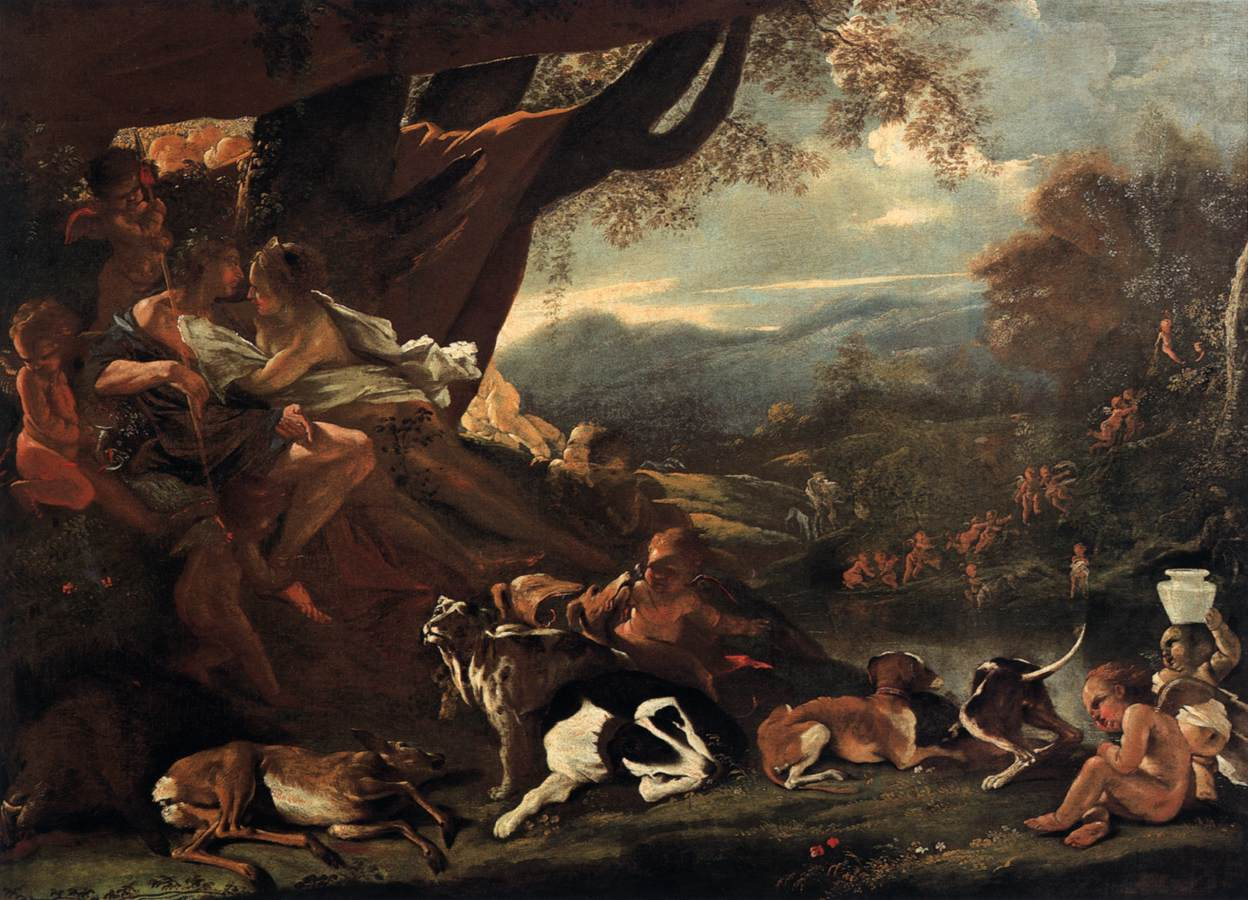
Venus and Adonis, Gemäldegalerie der Akademie der bildenden Künste, Vienna

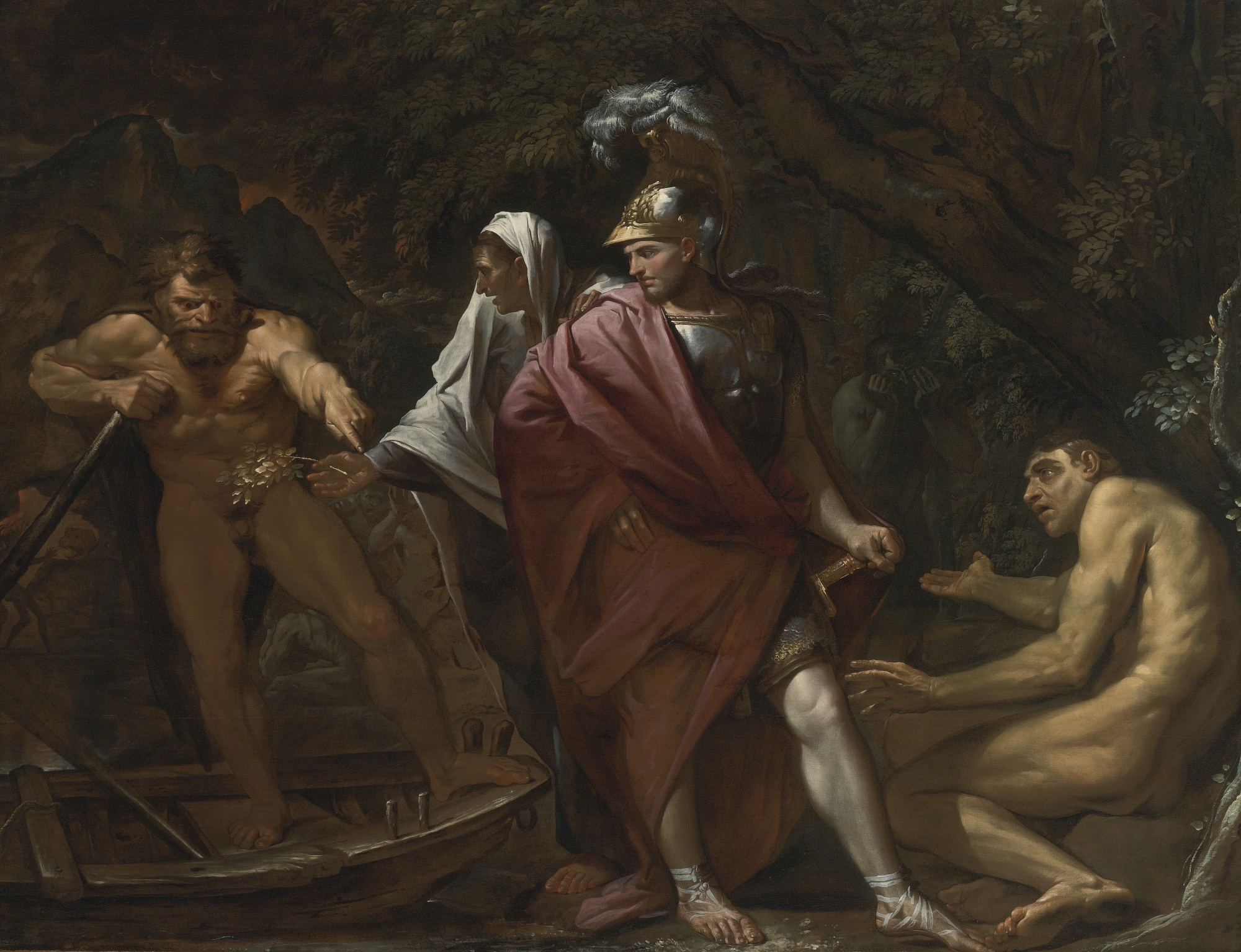
Aeneas on the bank of the River Styx, priv. col.
Etchings

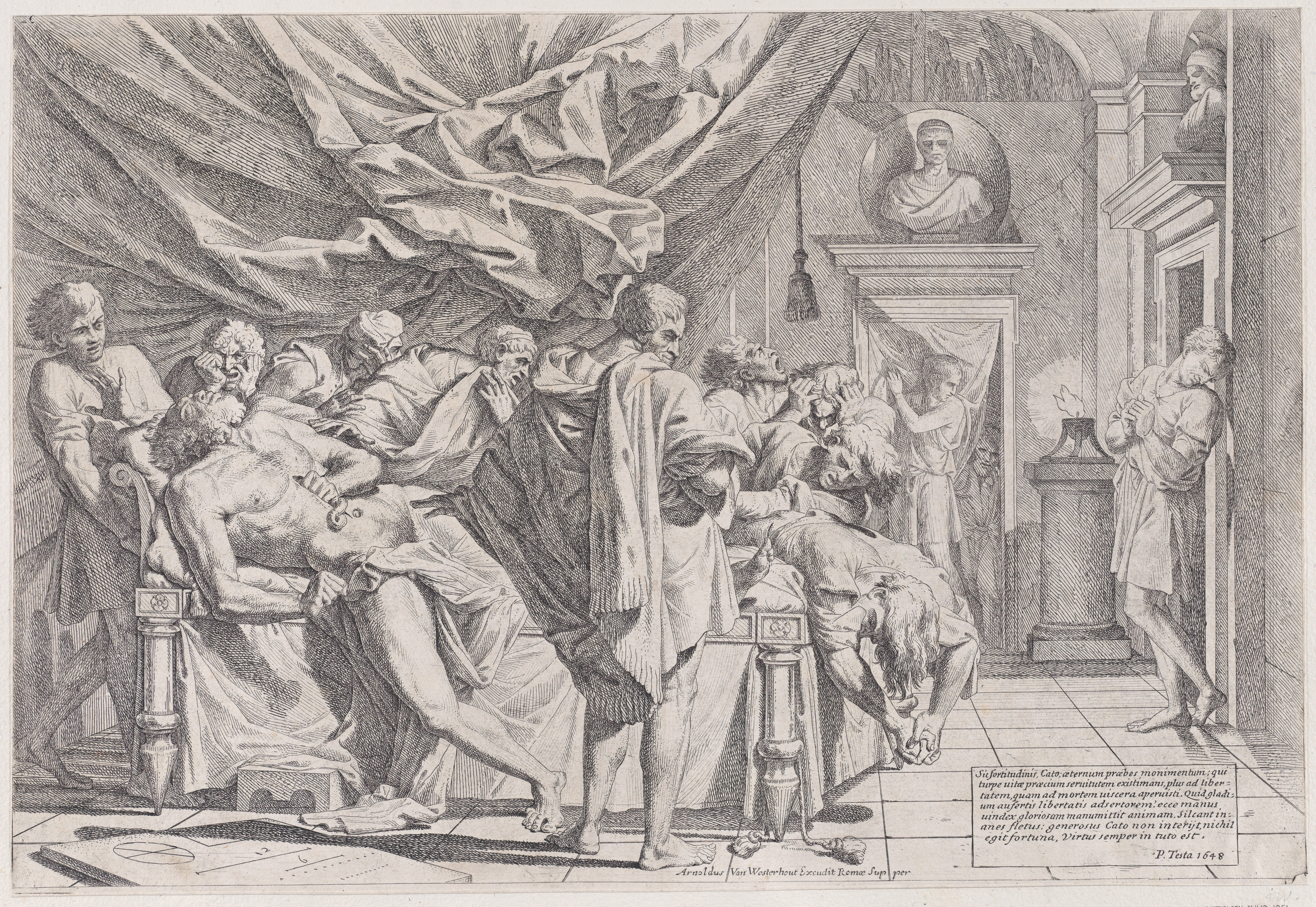
The suicide of the philosopher Cato, 1648, Metropolitan Museum of Art, New York

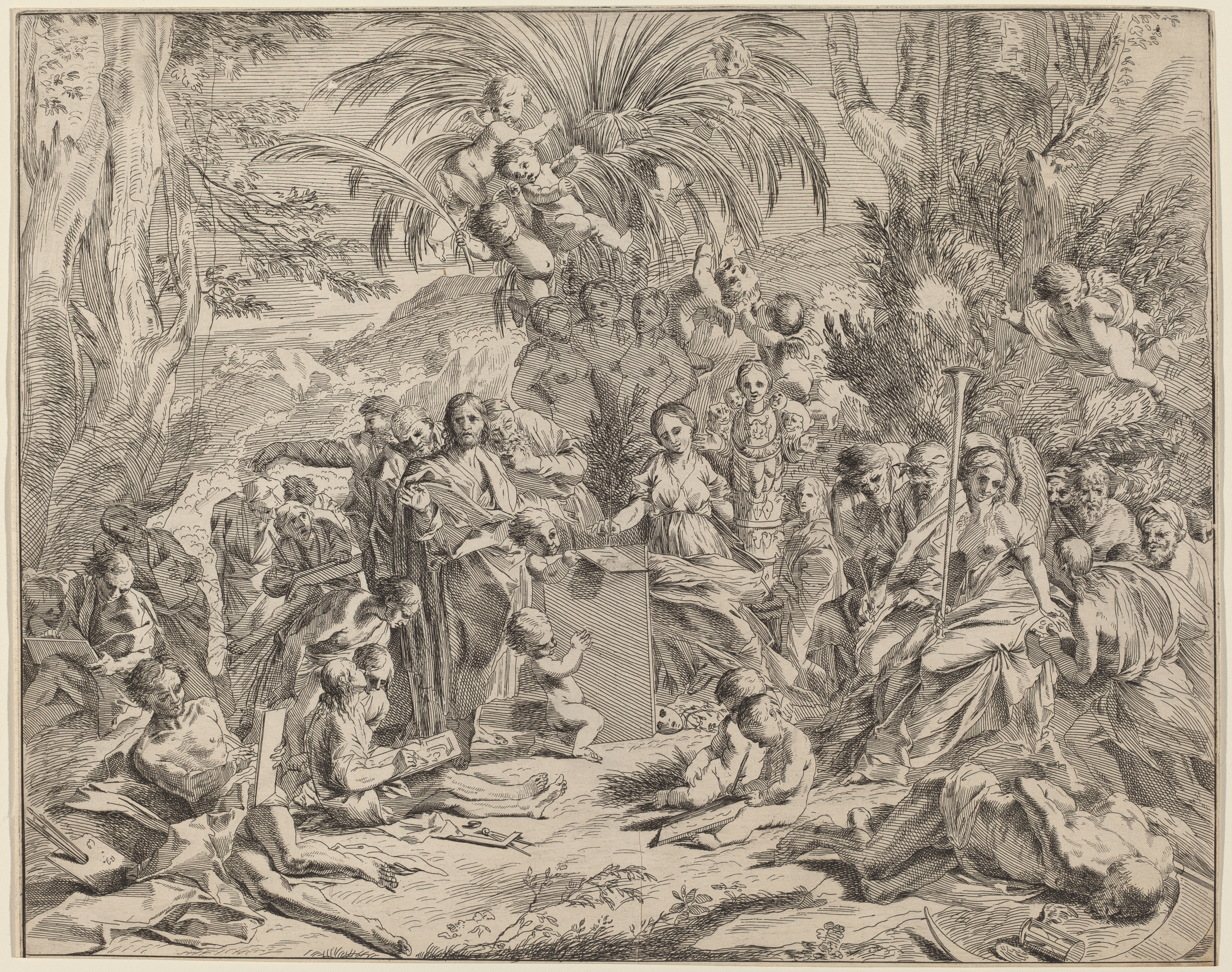
Allegory of Painting, 1648, National Gallery of Art, Washington, D.C.

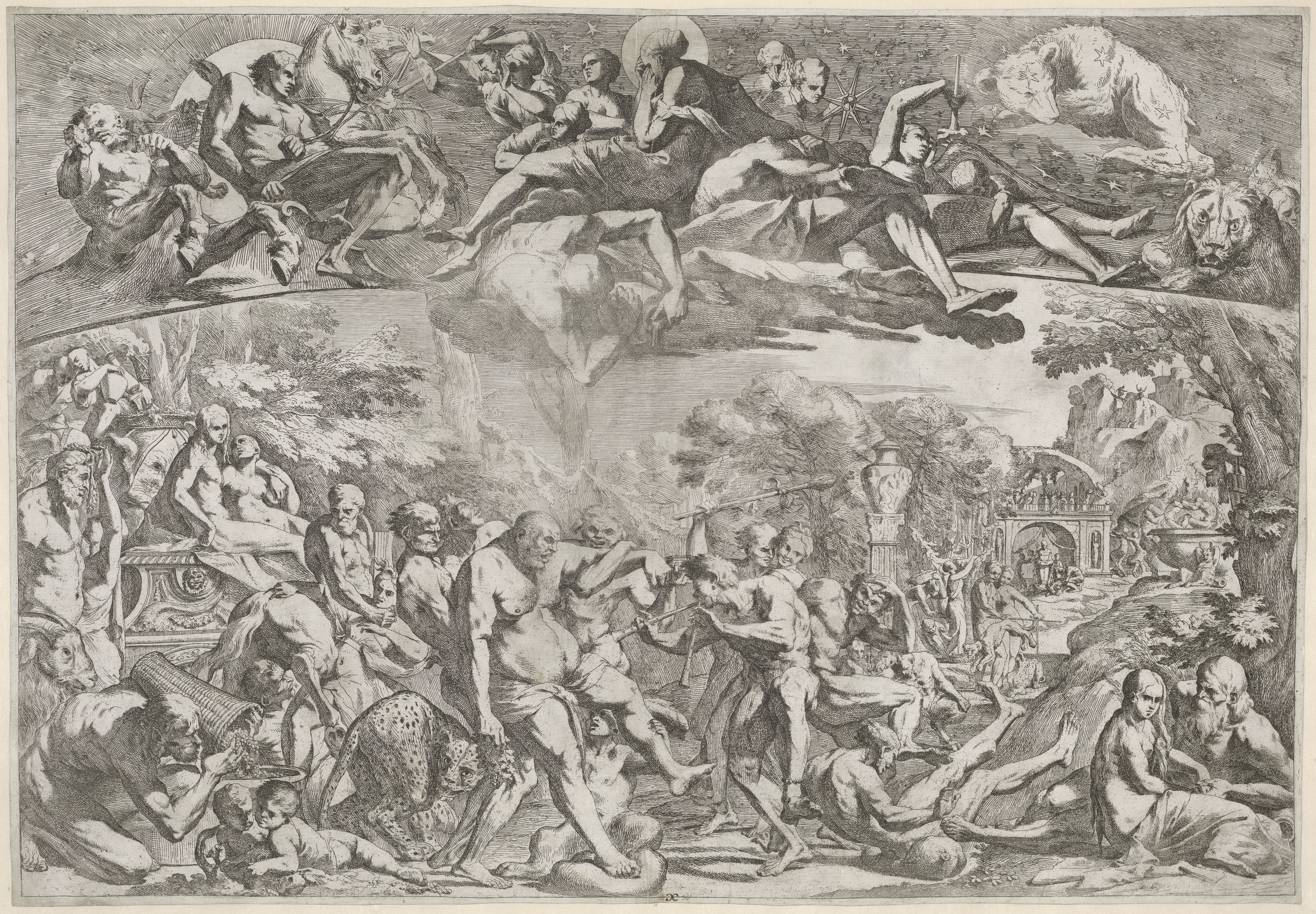
The Seasons, 1638–1644, Rijksmuseum, Amsterdam

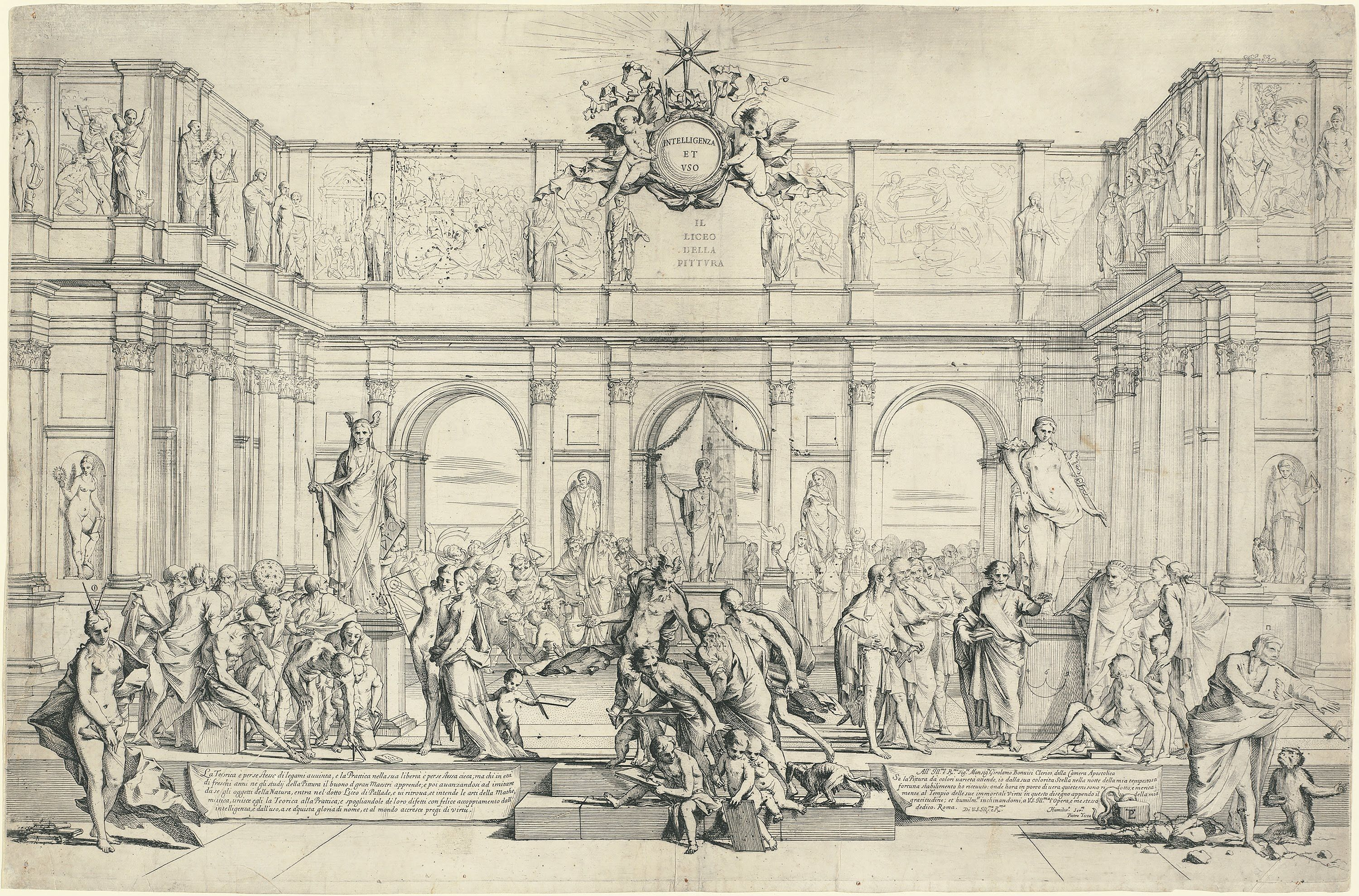
Lyceum of Painting, c. 1638, National Gallery of Art, Washington, D.C.

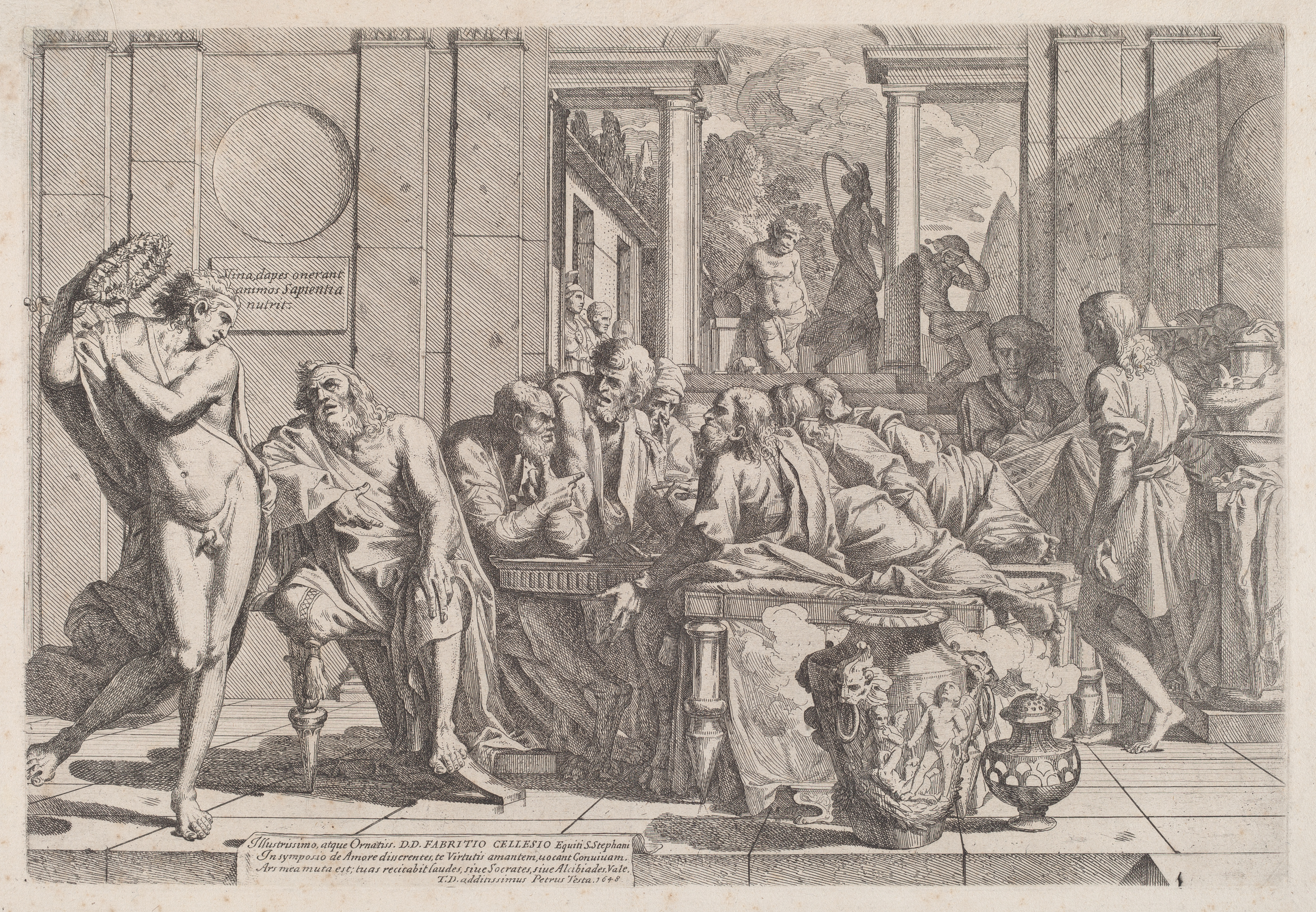
The Symposium, 1648, National Gallery of Art, Washington, D.C.

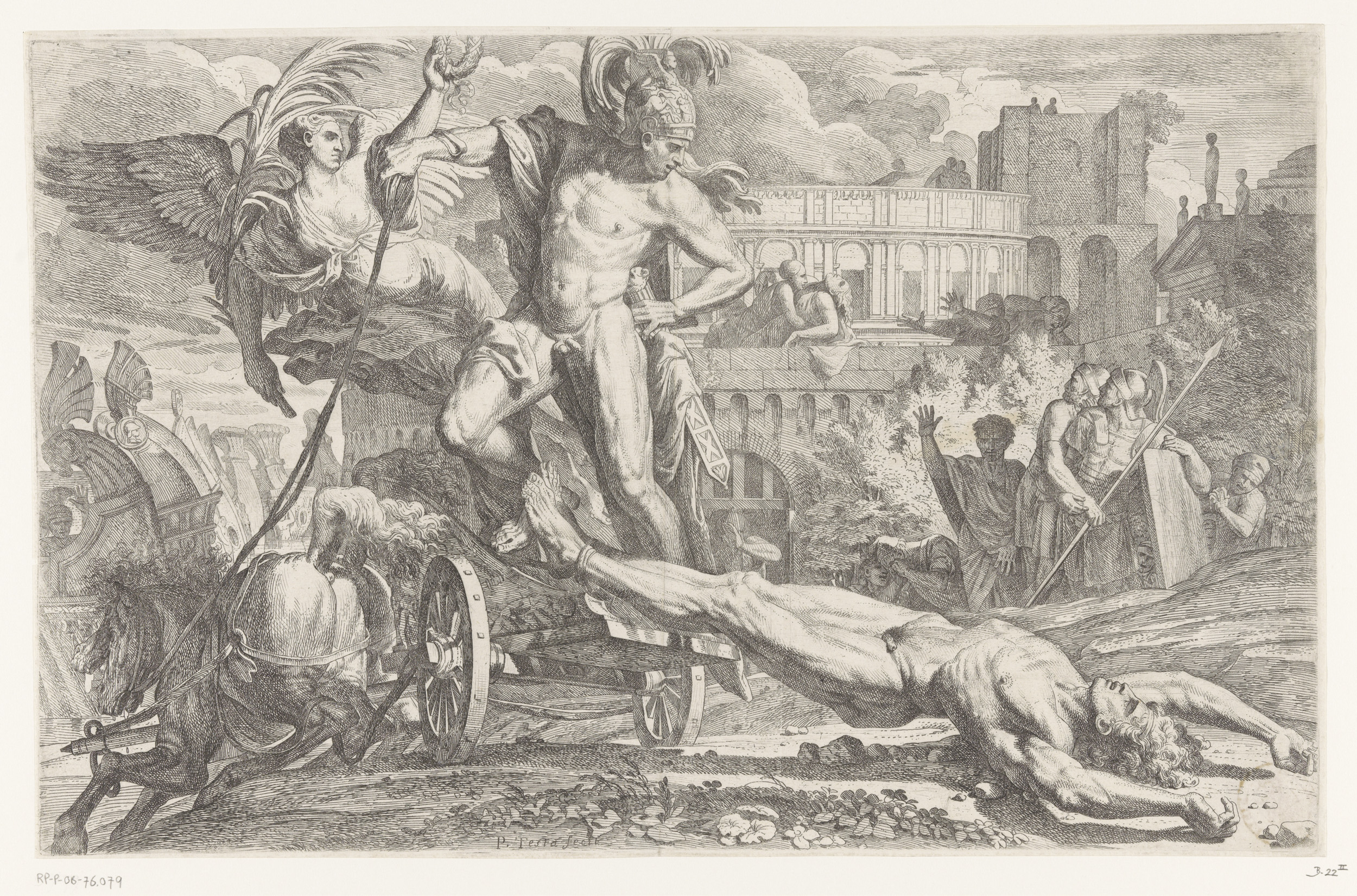
Achilles Dragging the Body of Hector, c. 1648, Rijksmuseum, Amsterdam

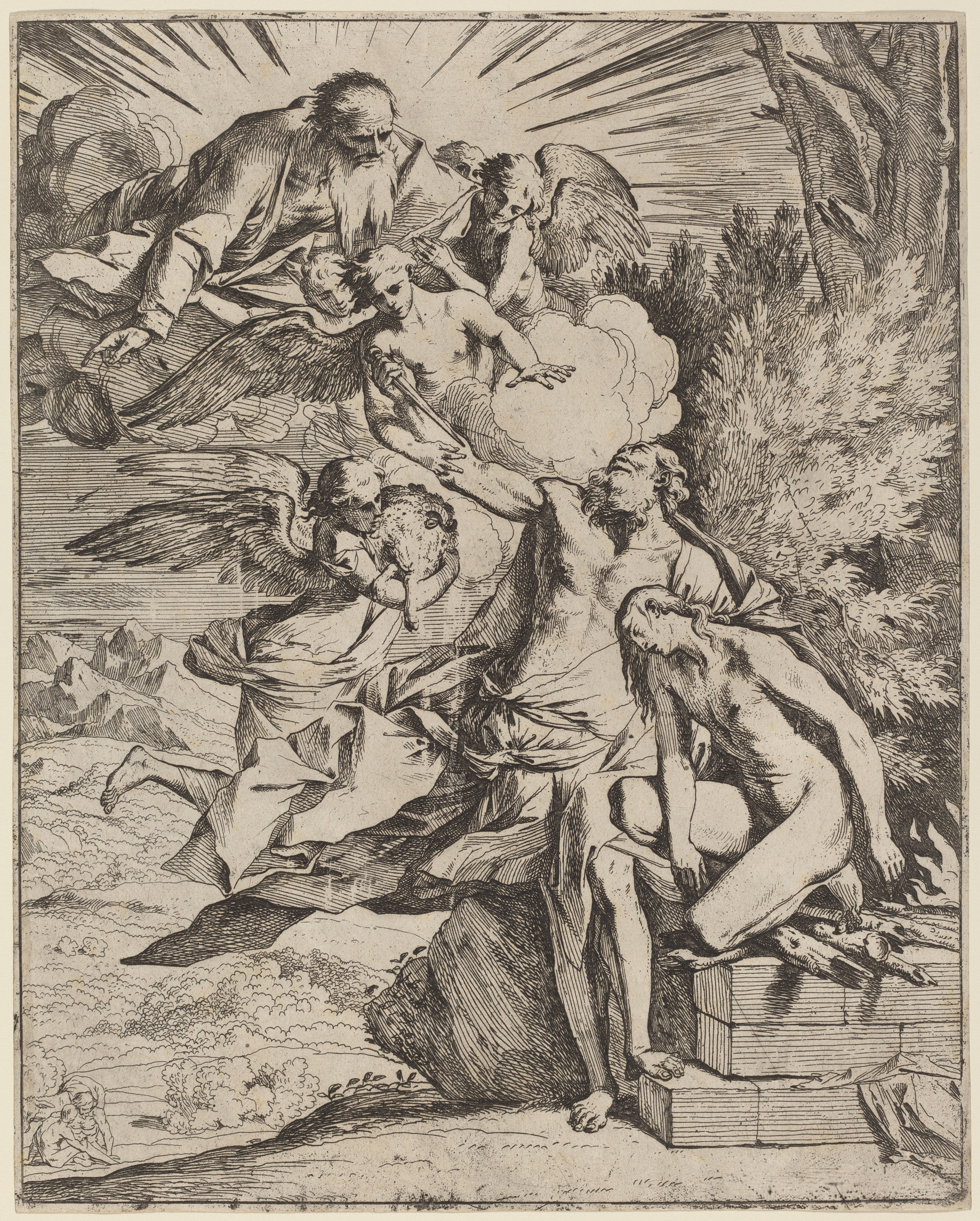
The Sacrifice of Abraham, 1650, National Gallery of Art, Washington, D.C.

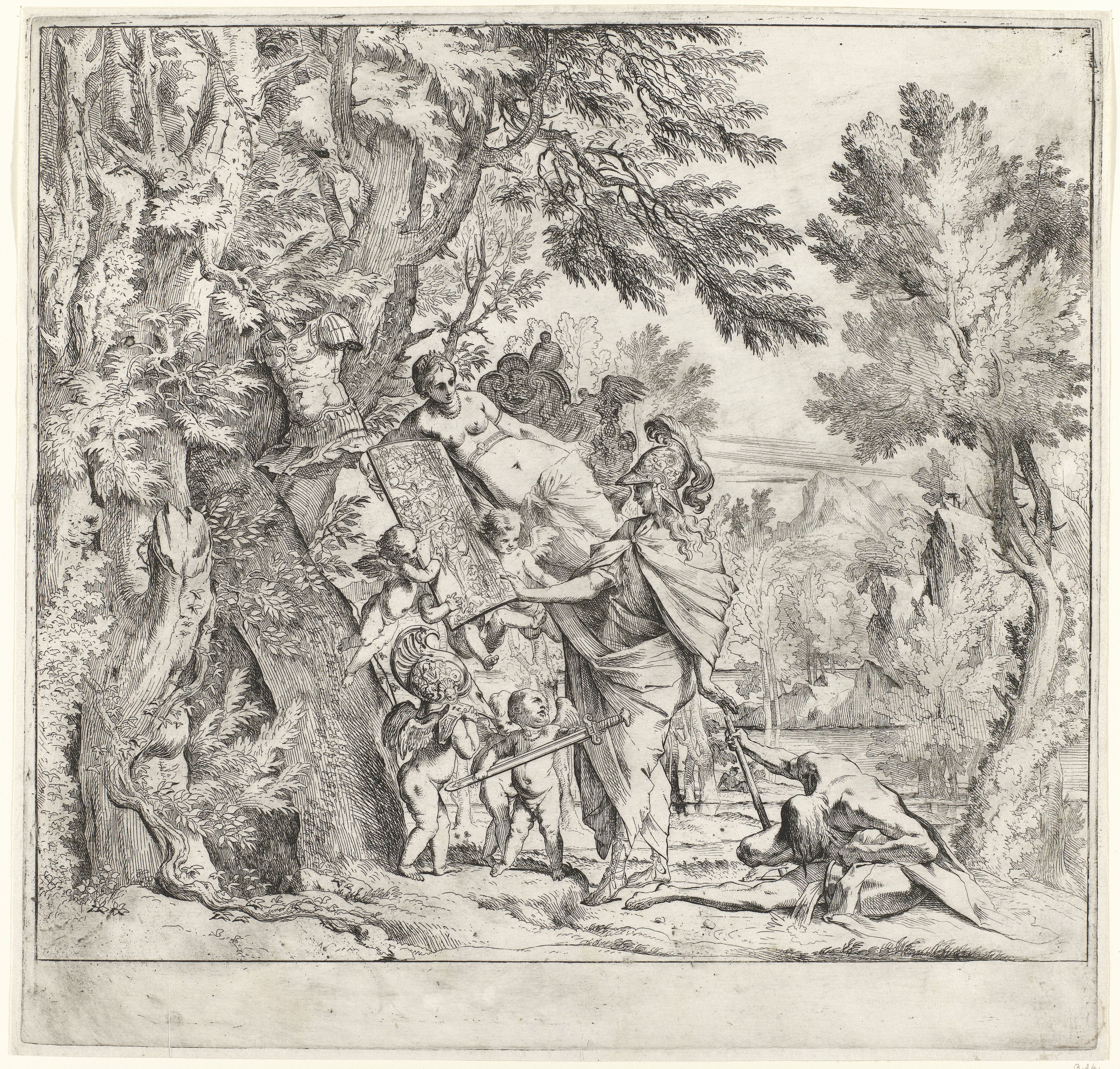
Venus gives Aeneas his armor, c. 1640, Rijksmuseum, Amsterdam

== Sources ==
- Baldinucci, Filippo (1847). F. Ranalli (ed.). Notizie de' professori del disegno da Cimabue in qua. Vol. 5. Florence: V. Batelli & Co. pp. 310–21.
- Sandrart, Joachim von (1925) [1675–9]. A. R. Peltzer (ed.). Teutsche Academie der Edlen Bau-, Bild- und Mahlerey-Künste. Munich: G. Hirth's Verlag.
- Passeri, Giovanni Battista (1934). J. Hess (ed.). Vite de' Pittori, Scultori ed Architetti che anno lavorato in Roma, morti dal 1641 fino al 1673. Leipzig–Vienna. pp. 182–8.
- Cropper, Elizabeth (1984). The Ideal of Painting: Pietro Testa's Düsseldorf Notebook. Princeton, NJ: Princeton University Press.
- Cropper, Elizabeth, ed. (1988). Pietro Testa, 1612-1650: Prints and Drawings (PDF). Philadelphia: Philadelphia Museum of Art.
- Freedberg, Sydney J. (1979). Painting in Italy: 1500 to 1600. The Pelican History of Art. New York: Penguin.
- Gage, John (1993). Color and Culture: Practice and Meaning From Antiquity to Abstraction. Boston: Little, Brown & Co.
- Kammen, Michael G. (2004). Time to Every Purpose: The Four Seasons in American Culture. Chapel Hill, NC: University of North Carolina Press.
- Wittkower, Rudolf (1973). Art and Architecture in Italy: 1600 to 1750. The Pelican History of Art. New York: Viking.
