= Niccolò Tornioli =

Italian painter

Niccolò Tornioli was an Italian painter. He was born in Rome in 1598 and still lived in Rome from 1633.

In the 1640s he worked for Cardinal Bernardino Spada and his brother Virgilio Spada. Most of his preserved paintings are today in Galleria Spada in Rome.

He painted for the Spada Chapel in the church of San Paolo in Bologna a Cain Slaying Abel and a Jacob Wrestling with the Angel.
