= Diocese of Carpi =

Roman Catholic diocese in Italy

Coordinates: 44.7833°N 10.8850°E

Diocese of Carpi Dioecesis Carpensis Diocesi di Carpi

Catholic
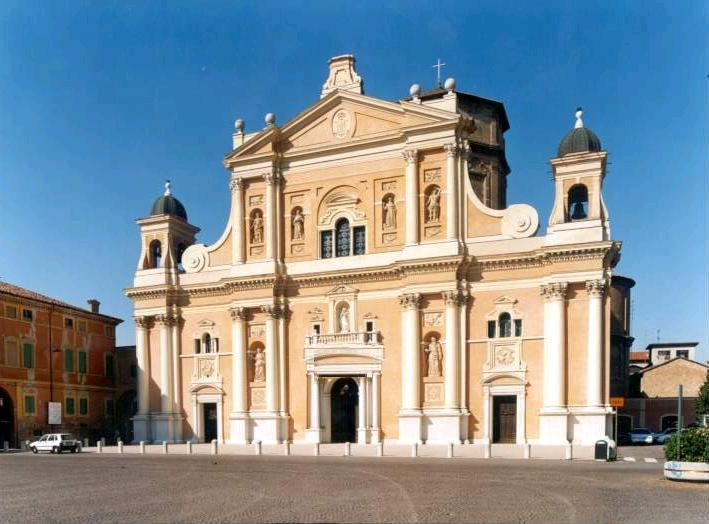
- Carpi Cathedral

Location
- Country: Italy
- Ecclesiastical province: Modena-Nonantola
- Headquarters: Carpi, Emilia-Romagna, Italy

Statistics
- Area: 415 km^{2} (160 sq mi)
- Population: Total; Catholics: (as of 2023); 135,279 ▲; 119,444 ▲ (88.3%)
- Parishes: 39

Information
- Denomination: Catholic Church
- Sui iuris church: Latin Church
- Rite: Roman Rite
- Established: 1 December 1779; 246 years ago
- Cathedral: Basilica Cattedrale di S. Maria Assunta
- Patron saint: Bernardino of Siena; Bernardino Realino
- Secular priests: 47 (diocesan) ▼14 (Religious Orders) ▲16 Permanent Deacons

Current leadership
- Pope: Leo XIV
- Bishop: Erio Castellucci
- Bishops emeritus: Francesco Cavina

Website
- www.carpi.chiesacattolica.it

The Diocese of Carpi (Latin: Dioecesis Carpensis) is a Latin diocese of the Catholic Church in Emilia-Romagna, Italy. It is a suffragan of the Archdiocese of Modena-Nonantola.

== History ==
The city and territory of Carpi belonged originally to the Countess Matilda (1046–1115), from whom it passed in 1115 to the Holy See. From 1215 to 1319 it was subject to Modena and from then until 1525 was ruled by the Pio family, vassals of the Holy See.

Under Pope Julius II (1512) and Pope Leo X (1515) the Archpriesthood of the Collegiate Church of Carpi, and its territory, became immediately dependent on the Holy See, nullius dioecesis, having previously been under the jurisdiction of the diocese of Modena.

Carpi was created a see only in 1779, by Pope Pius VI, in the Bull Inter plurimas and assigned as a suffragan to the diocese of Bologna. The right of nomination of a bishop during a vacancy was granted to the Duke of Modena, provided that a nomination was made within a time fixed by the pope. The new Cathedral was assigned a Chapter, which was to consist of four dignities (the Archpriest, the Archdeacon, the Provost, and the Dean) and seventeen Canons. The town (oppidum) of Carpi was raised to the status of a city (civitas).

The first bishop was the former Jesuit, Francesco Benincasa, whose Religious Order had been dissolved by Pope Clement XIV in 1773. Benincasa protested so loudly and publicly that he was arrested on 25 December 1773, and was jailed until 12 September 1775. Benincasa was consecrated a bishop on 9 April 1780 by the Bishop of Modena, Giuseppe Maria Fogliani. He was assigned a part of the ducal residence as his episcopal palace.

In 1855 the diocese of Carpi was made a suffragan of the diocese of Modena by Pope Pius IX.

In 1922, the diocese had a Catholic population of c. 78,000, with 31 parishes; there were 78 diocesan priests, 4 priests of Religious Orders, 18 seminarians, 4 brothers and 54 sisters. The diocese in 2018 has thirty-nine parishes, including the cathedral parish.

== Bishops ==
- Francesco Benincasa, S.J. (13 December 1779 – 13 December 1793)
- Carlo Belloni (12 September 1794 – 22 July 1800)
- Giacomo Boschi (18 September 1807 – 21 March 1815)
- Filippo Cattani (19 April 1822 – 3 July 1826), appointed Bishop of Reggio Emilia
- Adeodato Antonio Giovanni Luigi Caleffi, O.S.B. (2 October 1826 – 5 July 1830)
- Clemente Maria Bassetti (28 February7 1831 – 13 May 1839)
- Pietro Raffaelli (23 December 1839 – 20 April 1849)
- Gaetano Maria Cattani (7 January 1850 – 28 January 1863)
- Gherardo Araldi (27 October 1871 – 11 December 1891), resigned
- Andrea Righetti (14 December 1891 – 6 June 1924)
- Giovanni Pranzini (18 November 1924 – 22 June 1935)
- Carlo De Ferrari, C.S.S. (16 December 1935 – 12 April 1941), appointed Archbishop of Trento
- Vigilio Federico Dalla Zuanna, O.F.M. Cap. (12 May 1941 – 24 November 1952), resigned
- Artemio Prati (31 December 1952 – 7 April 1983), retired
- Alessandro Maggiolini (7 April 1983 – 31 January 1989), appointed Bishop of Como
- Bassano Staffieri (11 July 1989 – 10 July 1999), appointed Bishop of La Spezia-Sarzana-Brugnato
- Elio Tinti (17 June 2000 – 14 November 2011), retired
- Francesco Cavina (14 November 2011 – 26 June 2019), resigned
- Erio Castellucci (7 December 2020 – Present)

== Books ==
- Cappelletti, Giuseppe (1859). Le chiese d'Italia: dalla loro origine sino ai nostri giorni (in Italian). Vol. Tomo decimoquinto (15). Venezia: G. Antonelli. pp. 401–409.
- Gams, Pius Bonifatius (1873). Series episcoporum Ecclesiae catholicae: quotquot innotuerunt a beato Petro apostolo. Ratisbon: Typis et Sumptibus Georgii Josephi Manz. p. 759.
- Ritzler, Remigius; Sefrin, Pirminus (1958). Hierarchia catholica medii et recentis aevi. Vol. VI (1730-1799). Patavii: Messagero di S. Antonio. pp. 175–176.
- Ritzler, Remigius; Sefrin, Pirminus (1968). Hierarchia Catholica medii et recentioris aevi (in Latin). Vol. VII (1800–1846). Monasterii: Libr. Regensburgiana.
- Remigius Ritzler; Pirminus Sefrin (1978). Hierarchia catholica Medii et recentioris aevi (in Latin). Vol. VIII (1846–1903). Il Messaggero di S. Antonio.
- Pięta, Zenon (2002). Hierarchia catholica medii et recentioris aevi (in Latin). Vol. IX. Padua: Messagero di San Antonio. ISBN 978-88-250-1000-8.
