= Francesco Moraglia =

Italian prelate of the Catholic Church (born 1953)

His Beatitude The Most Reverend Francesco Moraglia
- Patriarch of Venice
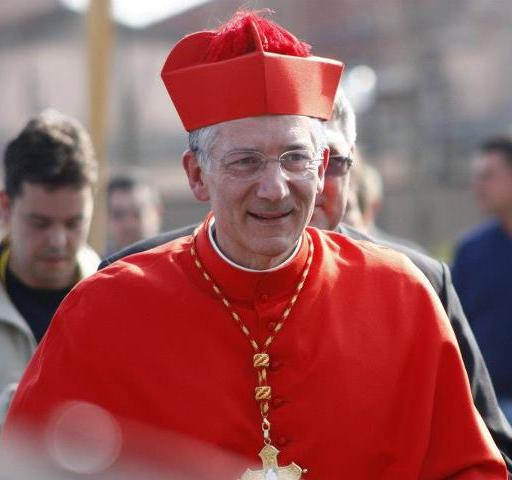
- Church: Roman Catholic Church
- Metropolis: Venice
- Appointed: 31 January 2012
- Installed: 25 March 2012
- Predecessor: Angelo Scola
- Previous post: Bishop of La Spezia-Sarzana-Brugnato (2007‍–‍2012)

Orders
- Ordination: 29 June 1977 by Giuseppe Siri
- Consecration: 3 February 2008 by Angelo Bagnasco

Personal details
- Born: 25 May 1953 (age 73) Genova, Italy
- Education: Pontifical Urban University
- Motto: Cum Maria Matre Iesu (Latin for 'With Mary the Mother of Jesus')
- Coat of arms

Francesco Moraglia (born 25 May 1953) is an Italian prelate of the Catholic Church. He has been Patriarch of Venice since March 2012; he is the first native of Genoa to hold that position. He was bishop of La Spezia-Sarzana-Brugnato from 2008 to 2012.

== Early life and career ==
Francesco Moraglia was born to a wealthy family in Genoa on 25 May 1953. His father Enrico was a lawyer. (Note: He died on 19 February 2012.) His mother Elena Cazzaniga, originally from Villasanta in Brianza, earned a degree in literature at the Catholic University of Milan and taught high school before leaving to raise their four children, two boys and two girls. (Note: She died on 19 January 2021.)

He attended public high school and then studied for the priesthood at the seminary in Genoa. Cardinal Giuseppe Siri ordained him a priest of the Archdiocese of Genoa on 29 June 1977.

In 1977‍–1979, he worked as educator and accompanist of theologians (III-IV-V theology) at the Major Archiepiscopal Seminary. From 1979 to 1988, he was assistant pastor in a parish in the city center.

After obtaining a licentiate at the Pontifical Urban University in Rome, since 1979 he has been teaching dogmatic theology at the Genoa section of the Theological Faculty of Northern Italy. In 1981, he obtained a doctorate in dogmatic theology at the Pontifical Urban University. Since 1986, he has been teaching Fundamental Dogmatic Theology and Sacramental Theology at the Ligurian Higher Institute of Religious Sciences, an institute of which he was dean from 1 December 1994 to 2007. In 1989, he also took up the position of professor of Christology, Anthropology and Sacramentary at the Genoa section of the Theological Faculty of Northern Italy. In 1995, he was elected president of the diocesan commission for the pastoral problems of alternative religious movements and sects, while in 1996 he was appointed director of the diocesan office for culture and university.

Since 2003, he has been a consultant to the Congregation for the Clergy. From 2004 to 2007, he was a canon of the chapter of the cathedral of San Lorenzo.

== Bishop of La Spezia-Sarzana-Brugnato ==
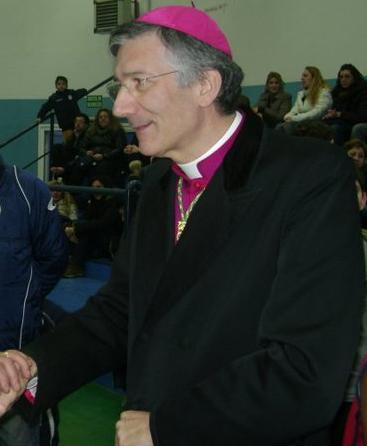
Francesco Moraglia, bishop of La Spezia-Sarzana-Brugnato, at a meeting

On 6 December 2007, Pope Benedict XVI appointed him to succeed Bassano Staffieri as bishop of La Spezia-Sarzana-Brugnato.

He received his episcopal ordination on 3 February 2008 in the cathedral of Genoa from Cardinal Angelo Bagnasco, archbishop of Genoa, assisted by Archbishop Mauro Piacenza, secretary of the Congregation for the Clergy and Bishop Staffieri, his predecessor in La Spezia. On 1 March, he took possession of the diocese.

In 2008, he inaugurated the practice of diocesan Marian pilgrimages on the first Saturday of the month. The tradition was explicitly referred by him to the prescription of the first of the Secrets of Fátima, to dedicate the first Saturday to the Reparatory Communion. On 10 January 2010 he announced his pastoral visit, while between 23 and 24 April of the same year he presided over the two diocesan days on the educational challenge.

From 23 April 2010 to 2013, he was Chairman of the Board of Directors of the Communication and Culture Foundation of the Italian Episcopal Conference, which manages its media initiatives.

When La Spezia and Lunigiana suffered catastrophic flooding in October 2011, he visited the affected areas and sent his seminarians to assist relief efforts. He said: "These events are a school of life.... They will learn something true and real." As bishop of La Spezia, he took positions in support of unemployed workers at the former San Giorgio appliance factory and participated in several trade union demonstrations to make it clear he shared the workers' concerns.

== Patriarch of Venice ==
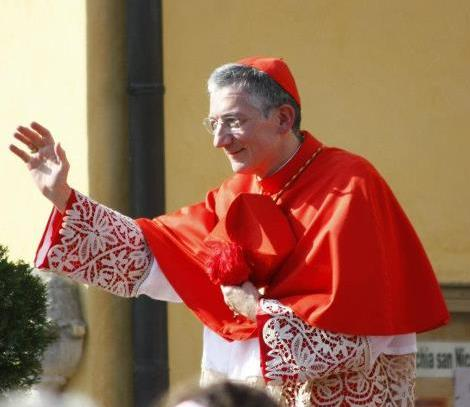
On the day of entry into the patriarchate (25 March 2012)

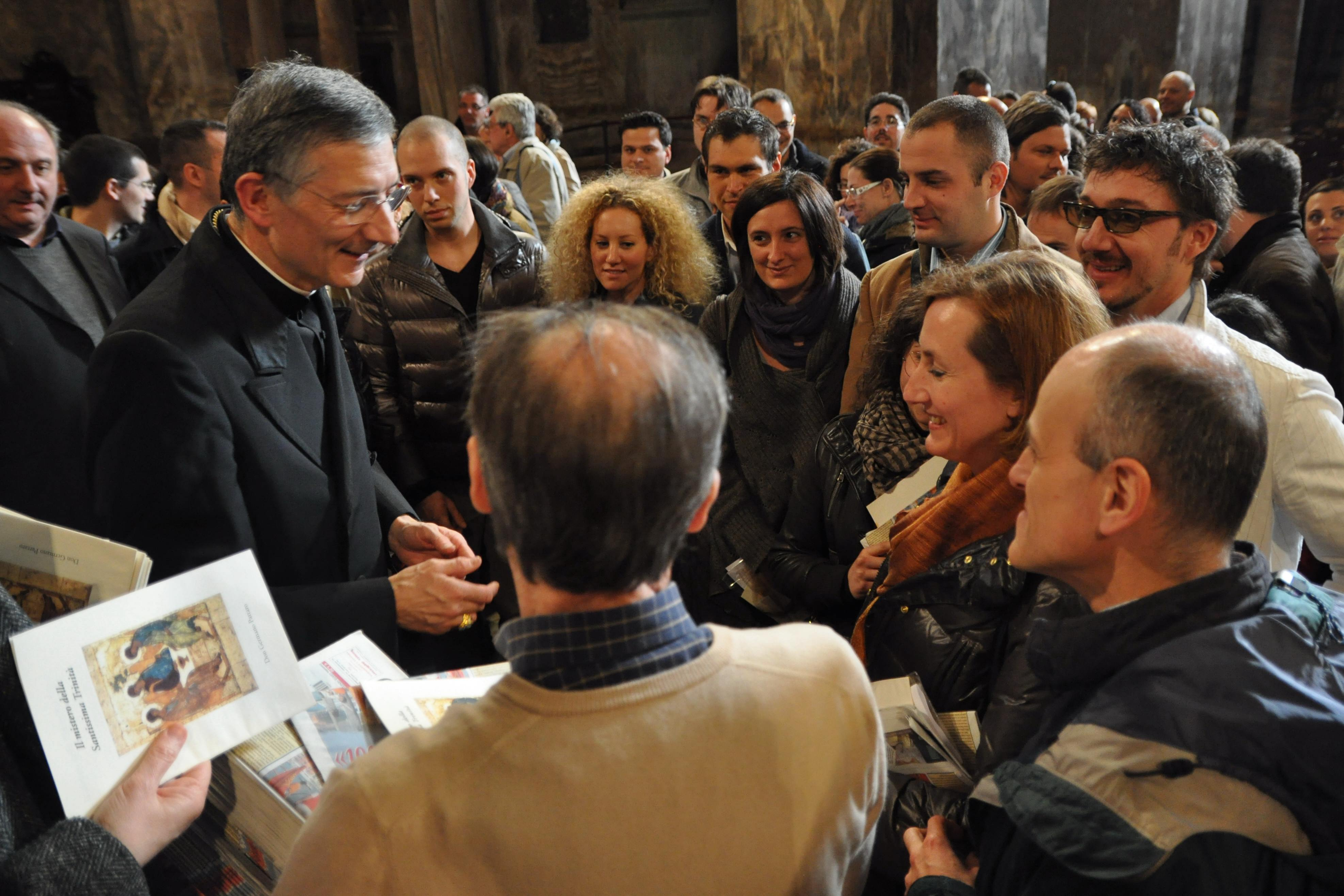
Meeting with engaged couples and young spouses

On 31 January 2012, Pope Benedict XVI appointed him Patriarch of Venice. (Note: On 11 March 2012, he said his farewells to the diocese of La Spezia-Sarzana-Brugnato.) (Note: The patriarch of Venice is ex officio grand chancellor of the Faculty of Canon Law "San Pio X" of Venice and holds the honorary title of primate of Dalmatia.) He was the first Genoese ever appointed patriarch of Venice. He was installed in Venice on 25 March. He received his pallium, the symbol of his role as a metropolitan, in St. Peter's Basilica on 29 June. Upon his appointment to Venice, his elevation to cardinal at the next consistory was predicted. When Pope Francis instead demonstrated a preference for sees not traditionally headed by a cardinal, the absence of Venice was noted, though it was also pointed out that "the current archbishops of both Venice and Turin are generally seen as members of the conservative wing of the Italian church". Another analysis finds him squarely in the model of Pope Francis' cardinals, especially in his concern for migrants and relations with Islam.

He has been president of the Triveneto Episcopal Conference since he was elected to his first five-year term on 29 May 2012; consequently, he is grand chancellor of the Theological Faculty of Triveneto, which is based in Padua. He was re-elected president of that Conference on 16 May 2017 and 10 May 2022.

On 18 September 2012, Pope Benedict included him on his list of papal appointees to participate in the Synod of Bishops on the New Evangelization in October.

In Venice, he continued to maintain a simple lifestyle, announcing that any furniture he needed could be found at IKEA and using only a Volkswagen Golf for transportation on the mainland as needed. He acted quickly to reduce administrative costs of the archdiocese, closing offices in the Calle degli Albanesi in the spring of 2013 and closing a high school.

In July 2014, he radically downsized the Studium Generale Marcianum, an education and research institute, established by his predecessor Angelo Scola. Since its founding in 2004, the Marcianum required financial support from private entities, and this produced a crisis when, in June 2014, a widespread scandal involving financial irregularities and bribery related to the MOSE hydraulic project involved one of the Marcianum's principal sponsors. Moraglia used the occasion to review the Marcianum anew in light of the pressures it placed on Church finances and the way corporate support placed inevitable restraints on its freedom. In July he announced the entire complex would be dismantled, with provision made for students who needed to complete their degree programs and for the needs of displaced employees. He took this action after Scola declined to provide financial support and having coordinated his decision with officials of the Roman Curia and informed Pope Francis.

He established the practice of weekday visits to each of the 128 parishes of the lagoon diocese, which begins the week after its entry and completes in December 2014, celebrating Mass and meeting the faithful in the daily life of the weekdays It establishes, as already in La Spezia, the practice of diocesan Marian pilgrimages on the first Saturday of the month. On 26 October 2013, he started the mission of street evangelizers giving eighty boys the mandate to reach the pockets of greatest degradation of the diocese. It dedicates particular pastoral care to those in conditions of greater fragility, both personal (young people, prisoners, women victims of violence) and linked to the economic crisis that marks the diocesan territory and strengthens the structures of Caritas.

In 2016, he reorganized the patriarchate, organizing its 128 parishes into 40 groupings or "pastoral alliances" based on geographic access that supports collaboration. He initiated a series of pastoral visits to provoke these collaborations to action.

He has dedicated his four pastoral letters to social issues: "I know in whom I have placed my faith" (14 October 2012); "The Christian faith in a context of widespread secularization" (2 February 2013); "Invitation to the Social Doctrine of the Church" (1 May 2013); and "Family and city of men. Society, work and the common good" (15 October 2013).

Venice suffered a series of record floods in 2018–2019, which prompted Moraglia to use his annual sermon on the feast of the Madonna della Salute and a series of interviews to rouse the government and public opinion to action. He called for "a different model of development" designed for its citizens: "It cannot remain a Disneyland that has been sold off to tourists." He demanded "effective action plans" from officials he found disconnected from the city's shrinking population who "suffer not because they are losing everything, but because of the feeling of being abandoned". He said saving the exhausted residents needed to take priority over the city's artistic treasures. He called for banning visits by transatlantic liners and an end to "the suffocating onslaught of tourists", an end to corruption that leaves the city at risk of destruction. He hoped for urgent recognition that Venice "can no longer be entrusted to occasional funding and distracted policies". And underpinning his views was a call for respect for nature and "the alarms of the disturbed climate".

In June 2019, he attacked the Salvini government's immigration policies, called welcoming refugees "a duty", and characterized the construction of physical barriers as "illusory" and "out of touch with reality". He has also cooperated with the Muslim community of Venice in welcoming refugees from the former concentration camp in Cornetta.

In 2020, he appointed women to two positions previously reserved to men. In July 2020, he appointed Sister Simone Pereira de Araújo, FGC diocesan treasurer. (Note: Born in 1972 in Porto Feliz in Brazil, Pereira joined the Daughters of San Giuseppe del Caburlotto in 1995. She earned degrees in pedagogy and religious sciences in São Paulo and then studied at the Faculty of Canon Law "San Pio X" in Venice from 2006 to 2012, obtaining a licentiate and a doctorate in canon law. She then held positions within her order in Brazil and in July 2016 became vicar to the provincial superior. From 2017 to 2020, she lived in Venice, working as councilor and general secretary of her order and lecturing on canon law.) In October 2020, he appointed Laura Friselle, an attorney, president of the Board of Directors of the Opera Santa Maria della Carità, a foundation that operates a public health agency that supports people with disabilities and a variety of addiction health issues.

== Notes ==
Catholic Church titles
Preceded by Bassano Staffieri	Bishop of La Spezia-Sarzana-Brugnato; 6 December 2007 – 31 January 2012	Succeeded by Luigi Palletti
Preceded by Angelo Scola	Patriarch of Venice; 31 January 2012 – present	Incumbent
