= Elio Tinti =

Italian Roman Catholic bishop (1936–2024)

His Excellency Elio Tinti
- Bishop Emeritus of Carpi
- Archdiocese: Modena–Nonantola
- Appointed: 17 June 2000
- Term ended: 14 November 2011
- Predecessor: Bassano Staffieri
- Successor: Francesco Cavina

Orders
- Ordination: 25 July 1960 by Giacomo Lercaro
- Consecration: 26 August 2000 by Giacomo Biffi

Personal details
- Born: 14 August 1936 Bologna, Italy
- Died: 24 September 2024 (aged 88) Bologna, Italy
- Motto: Omnia In Christo
- Coat of arms

Styles of Elio Tinti
- Reference style: His Excellency; The Most Reverend
- Spoken style: Your Excellency
- Religious style: Bishop

Elio Tinti (14 August 1936 – 24 September 2024) was an Italian Roman Catholic prelate. He was bishop of Carpi from 2000 to 2011. Tinti died in Bologna on 24 September 2024, at the age of 88.

Catholic Church titles
Preceded by Bassano Staffieri	Bishop of Carpi; 2000–2011	Succeeded by Francesco Cavina
