= Ceccardus of Luni =

9th-century Italian bishop

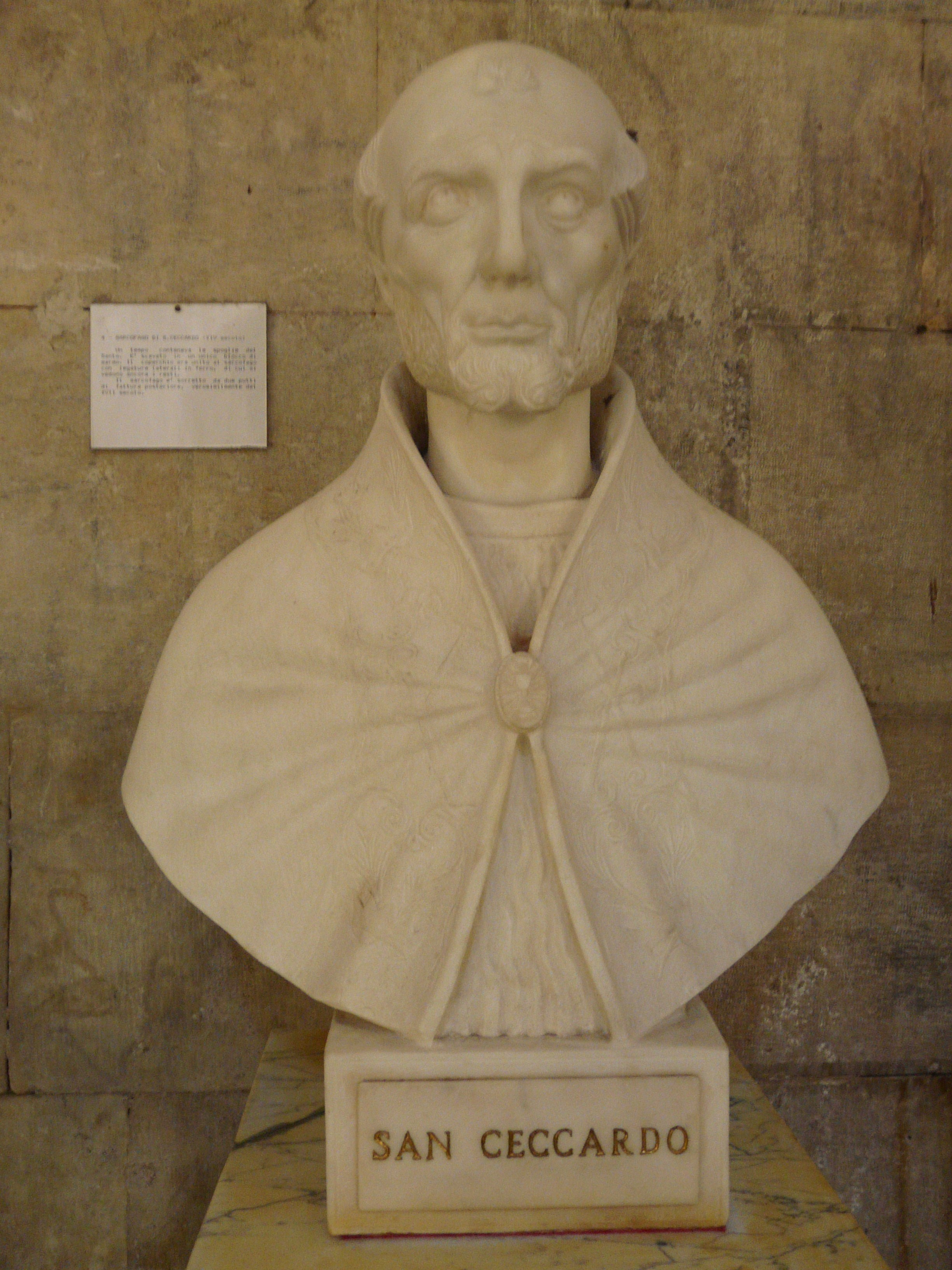
- Bust of Saint Ceccardus in Carrara Cathedral

Bishop
- Died: 860 AD
- Venerated in: Roman Catholic Church
- Canonized: 9 April 1832
- Major shrine: Carrara Cathedral
- Feast: June 16
- Patronage: Carrara

Saint Ceccardus of Luni (died 860), otherwise San Ceccardo, was a bishop of Luni in Liguria, Italy, who was believed to have been killed by Vikings (Bjorn Ironside and Hastein, probably in 860 when they sacked the city of Luni.

He was declared a martyr and later became the patron saint of Carrara. His feast day is 16 June.

== Life ==
He drew up a brief commemoration of the episcopate of Petroaldo (816?-826?); in this document, as a cleric, he signs himself as Sicheradus Silitraldi. The name indicates his probable origin from a Byzantine family.

Ceccardo suffered martyrdom as a bishop when the Vikings of Hastein conquered Luni in 860. Hastein was a Viking chieftain, who, around 860, joined with Björn Ironside to lead an expedition to raid countries in the Mediterranean. After sacking Nîmes and Arles, they turned to Italy where they attacked the city of Luna. Believing it to be Rome, Hastein had his men carry him to the gate and tell the guards he was dying and wished to convert to Christianity. Once inside, he was taken to the town's church where he received the sacraments, before jumping from his stretcher and leading his men in a sack of the town.

== Veneration ==
In the place indicated by the legends, the church of San Ceccardo ad Acquas was built, at least as early as the 14th century, containing a small spring that sprang up where the first stream of blood of the martyr would have touched the ground (a similar legend is at the base of the Tre Fontane monastery in Rome).

His body is kept in the Cathedral of Carrara and has undergone at least five recognitions: in 1599 during the episcopate of Giovanni Battista Salvago, in 1625, in 1782 and in 1949, during the episcopate of Carlo Boiardi, bishop of Apuania. The last survey was carried out at the end of the 90s of the twentieth century.

The cult of San Ceccardo, bishop and martyr, was strongly promoted by the Canons Regular of San Frediano of Lucca, who took care of the cathedral until the late eighteenth century, when the Duchess of Modena had the church transferred to the diocesan clergy. This propaganda activity was part of a targeted action of pressure by the above-mentioned canons, aimed at the recognition of the jurisdiction nullius dioeceseos of the church itself.

However, this doesn't take anything away from the strong devotion of the citizenship since the most remote times to San Ceccardo - to whom tradition attributes many miraculous interventions.

=== Feast day ===
The solemnity of St. Ceccardo, patron of the town, of the municipality and of the vicariate of Carrara, is June 16.
