= Giovanni Francesco Pogliasca =

Italian Roman Catholic prelate

Most Reverend Giovanni Francesco Pogliasca
- Bishop of Luni e Sarzana
- Church: Catholic Church
- Diocese: Diocese of Luni e Sarzana
- In office: 1537–1561
- Predecessor: Silvestro Benedetti
- Successor: Simone Pasqua

Orders
- Consecration: 22 Feb 1538 by Alfonso Oliva

Personal details
- Died: 1561

Giovanni Francesco Pogliasca or Giovanni Francesco Polascha (died 1561) was a Roman Catholic prelate who served as Bishop of Luni e Sarzana (1537–1561).

== Biography ==
On 28 Nov 1537, he was appointed during the papacy of Pope Paul III as Bishop of Luni e Sarzana. On 22 Feb 1538, he was consecrated bishop by Alfonso Oliva, Bishop of Bovino, with Uberto Gambara, Bishop of Tortona, and Pietro Lamberti, Bishop of Caserta, serving as co-consecrators. He served as Bishop of Luni e Sarzana until his death in 1561.

== External links and additional sources ==
- Cheney, David M. "Diocese of La Spezia-Sarzana-Brugnato". Catholic-Hierarchy.org. (for Chronology of Bishops) ^{[self-published]}
- Chow, Gabriel. "Titular Episcopal See of Luni (Italy)". GCatholic.org. (for Chronology of Bishops) ^{[self-published]}

Catholic Church titles
Preceded by Silvestro Benedetti	Bishop of Luni e Sarzana; 1537–1561	Succeeded by Simone Pasqua
