= Carrara Cathedral =

Roman Catholic church in Tuscany, Italy

Coordinates: 44.0800°N 10.0994°E

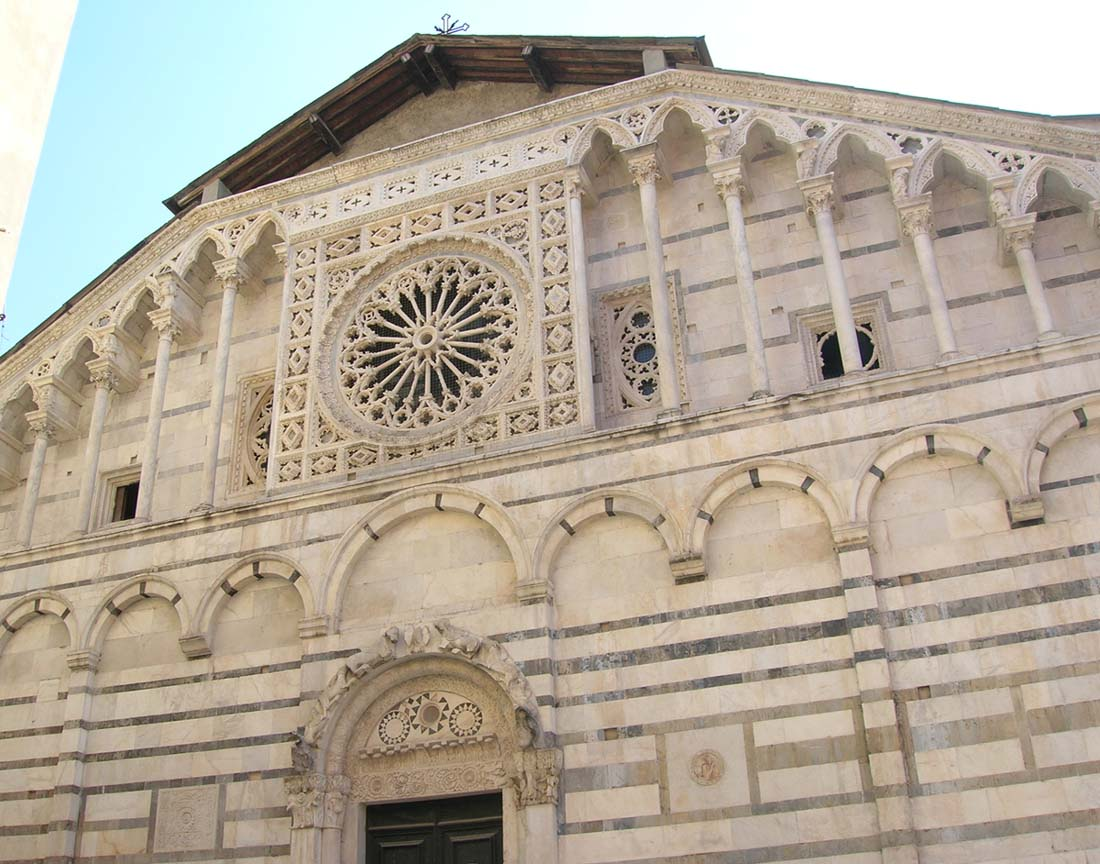
Façade of the Cathedral

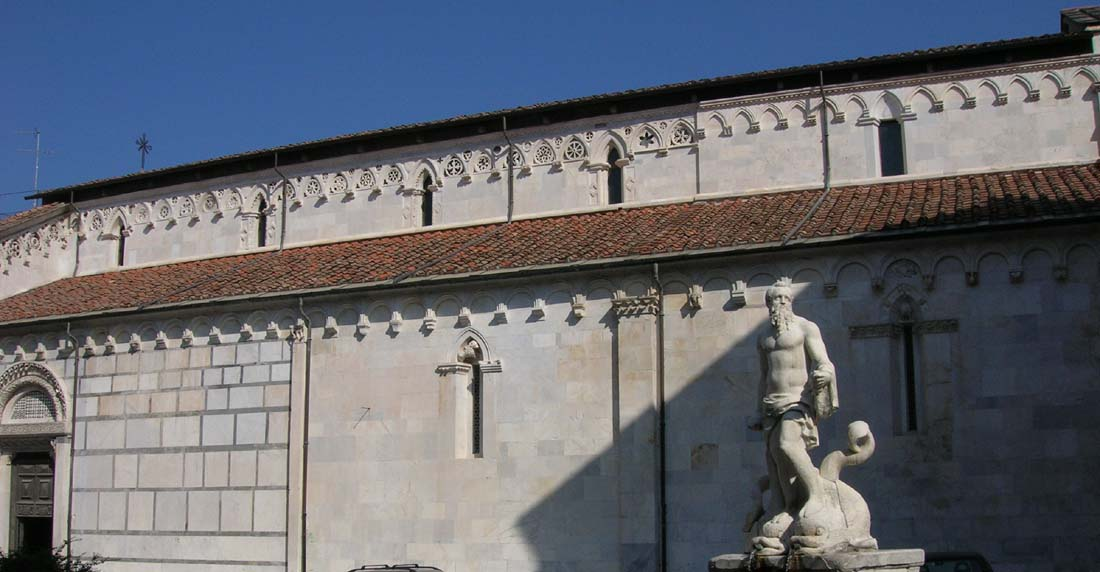
Side view

Carrara Cathedral (Italian: Duomo di Carrara) is a Roman Catholic church, dedicated to Saint Andrew, in the town of Carrara, located in central Italy. Most of the exterior, and much of the interior, is covered in the local Carrara marble.

== History ==
An older church, Ecclesia Sancti Andree de Carraria, is mentioned as existing on this site as early as 1035, but of it, only a bas-relief remains. The first written documentation of the Carrara Cathedral dates to 1099. The church was first enlarged in 1099, when it received the status of pieve. It is the first Medieval church to be constructed entirely of marble. The marble used for its construction is Apuan marble, more commonly known as Carrara marble.

The lower section of the façade and the side area near the St. John Portal are characterized by a bichrome decoration with geometrical marble tarsias. This part of the building can be dated to the early 12th century by the influences of the Pisan Gothic style on the capitals and the architrave as well as the similarities in the alternating black and white marble patterning with the Tuscan churches of Pisa and Lucca. This style was also widespread in Liguria at the time, as shown by the similarity of the cathedral's portal with that of Genoa Cathedral, finished before 1142. The sculptors of the main portal and of the capitals of the first three spans in the interior belonged to the school of Maestor Wiligelmo.

In 1151 the church came under the jurisdiction of the Lateranense Canons of San Frediano of Lucca and the second building phase began, lasting until about 1235 when the apse is known to have existed. The presbytery was added around this time as well, which lengthened the building from its original floor plan. There are similarities of style to contemporary Lucchese architecture. The lateral walls continued without the bichrome decoration. In the interior, the capitals are in the Corinthian and Composite orders, and the mullioned windows have leaves, human and animal motifs, which are perhaps influenced by ancient Roman structures still existing in Lucca at the time.

== Overview ==
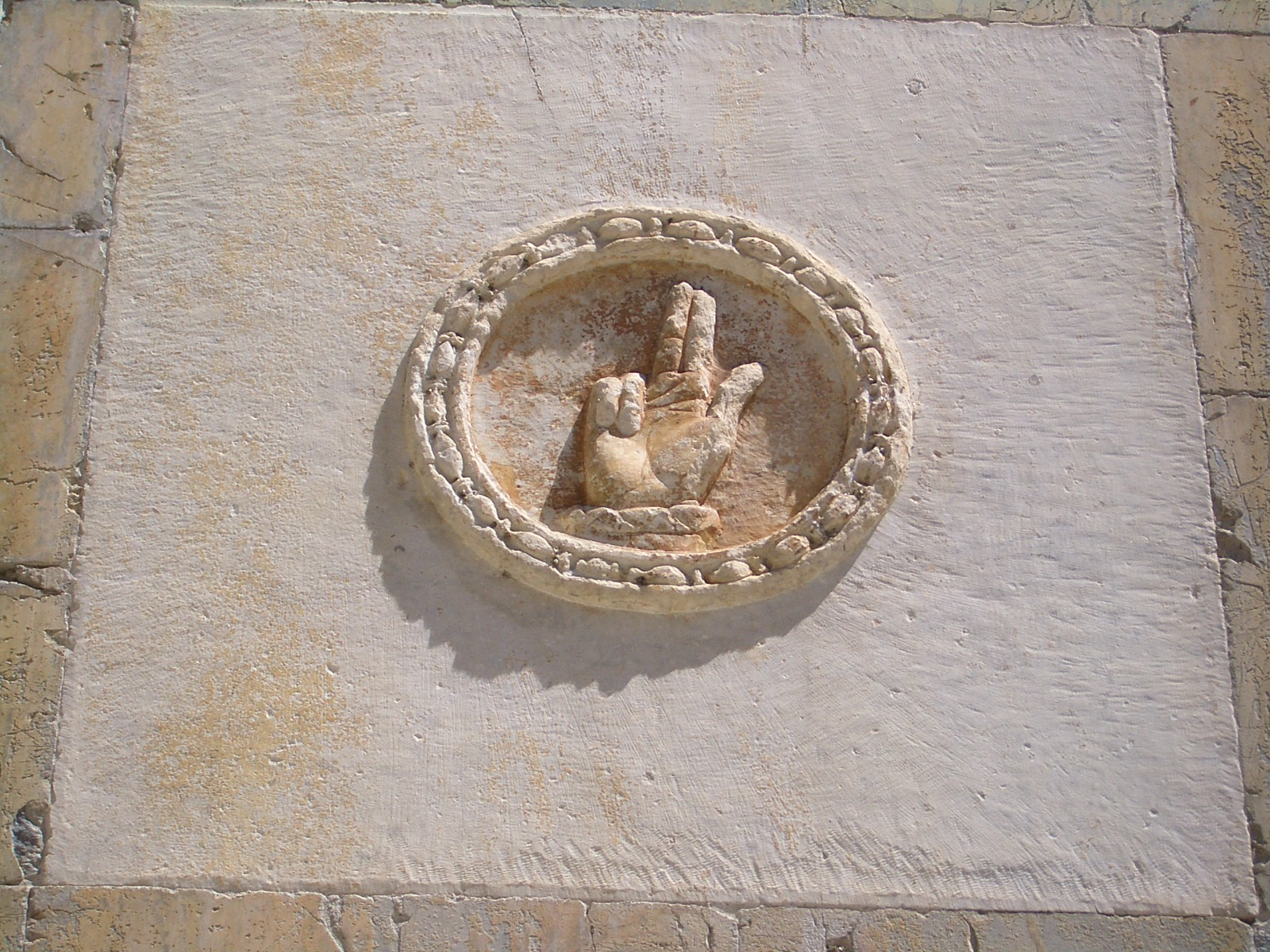
A design detail

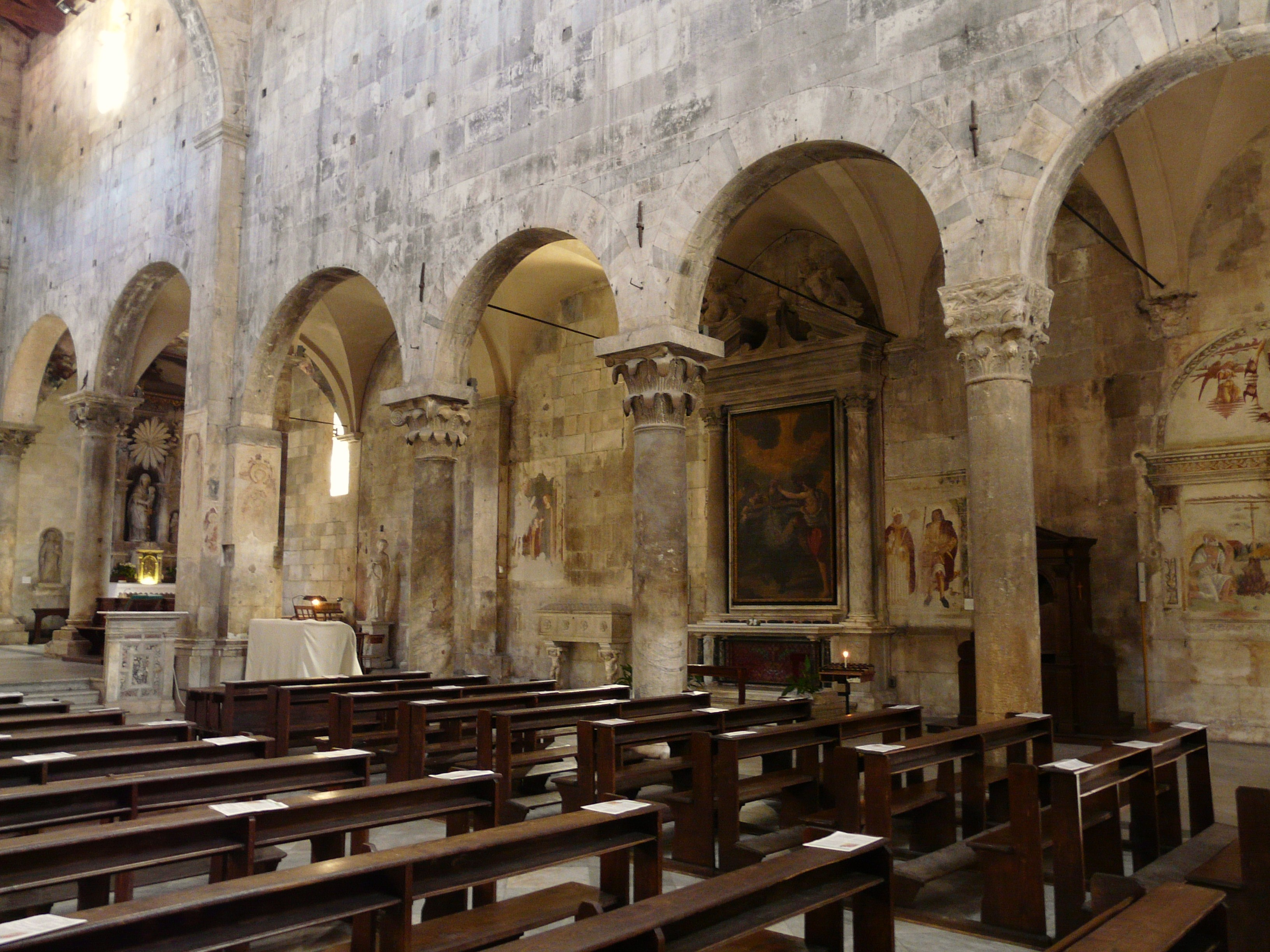
Right side aisle

The church has a rectangular plan, consisting of three naves, a presbytery and a semi-circular apse.

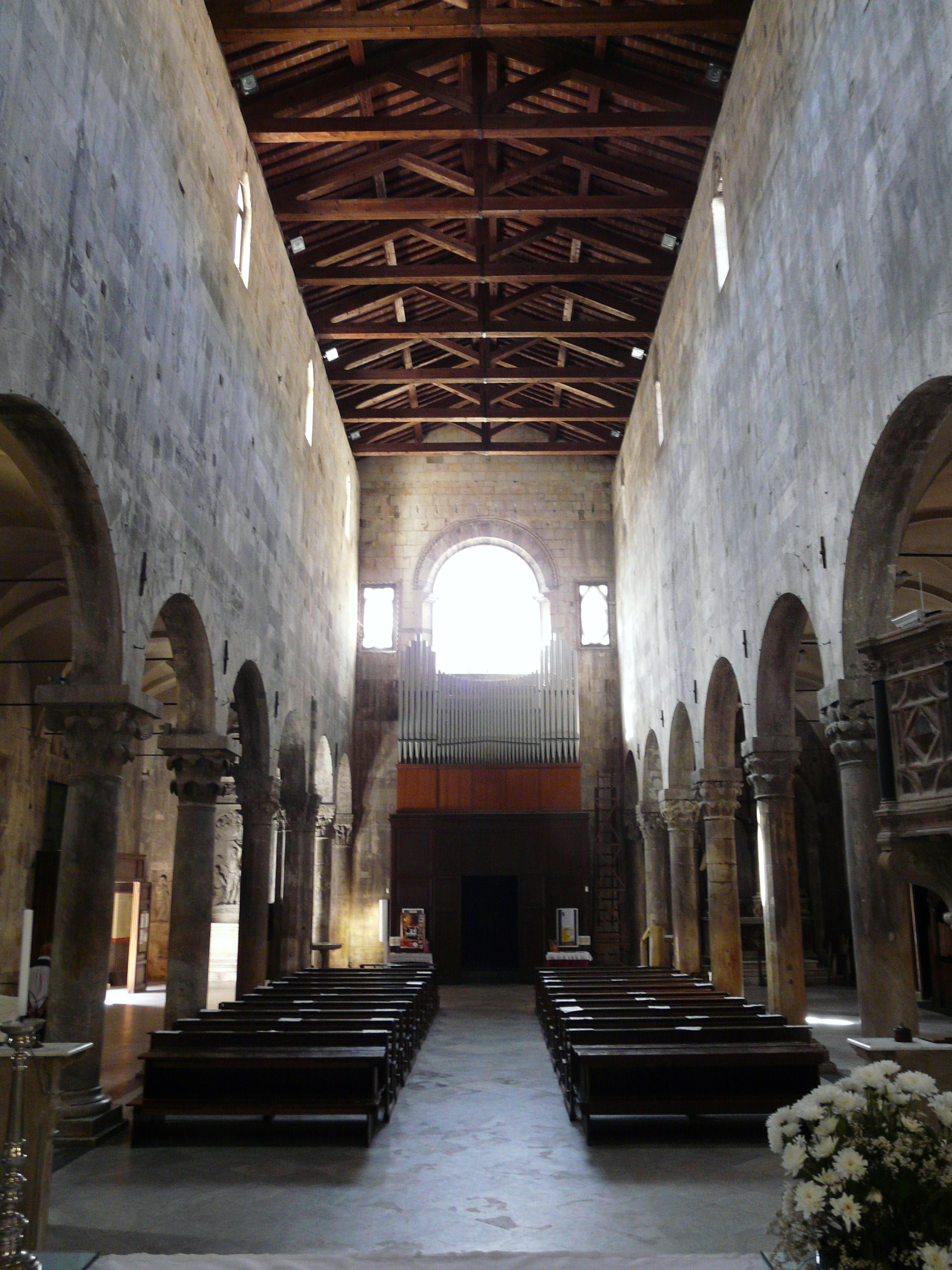
Center aisle

The façade is made up of a combination of Romanesque and Gothic styles. The façade, which was finished in the second half of the 14th century, is made up of a bichrome pattern of light and dark marble stone. The bottom part of the façade and the side elevations are Romanesque, while the portal, crowned by sculptures inspired by medieval bestiaries, and surmounted by a Gothic rose window with twisted columns, each different from the others, is consistent with the Gothic style of architecture in the 14th century. The bell tower, standing at 33 m (108 ft), was also built in the 14th century.

The interior of the cathedral consists of a taller nave with exposed wooden trusses, and two smaller cross-vaulted aisles. It houses the sarcophagus of St. Ceccardus, patron saint of Carrara, a 14th-century "Annunciation" (example of Pisan sculpture), and a 14th-century wooden crucifix by Angelo Puccinelli. There is also a white marble pulpit in the presbytery that was installed in the 16th century.

Outside the church is the "Statua del Gigante" (Statue of the Giant), by Baccio Bandinelli.
