= Luigi Palletti =

Bishop of La Spezia-Sarzana-Brugnato since 2012

The Most Reverend Luigi Palletti
- Bishop of La Spezia-Sarzana-Brugnato
- Church: Roman Catholic Church
- Diocese: La Spezia-Sarzana-Brugnato
- See: La Spezia-Sarzana-Brugnato
- Appointed: 20 October 2012
- Installed: 2 December 2012
- Predecessor: Francesco Moraglia
- Previous posts: Titular Bishop of Fondi (2004-12); Auxiliary Bishop of Genoa (2004-12)

Orders
- Ordination: 29 June 1983 by Giuseppe Siri
- Consecration: 16 January 2005 by Tarcisio Bertone

Personal details
- Born: Luigi Ernesto Palletti; 29 October 1956 (age 69) Genoa, Italy
- Motto: In verbo Tuo
- Coat of arms

Luigi Ernesto Palletti (born 29 October 1956) is an Italian prelate of the Catholic Church who has been the bishop of La Spezia-Sarzana-Brugnato since 2012.

Luigi Palletti was born in Genoa on 29 October 1956. After secondary school he enrolled at the "Nicolò Paganini" Conservatory in Genoa where he attended musical courses, graduating in piano in 1978. He entered the Major Seminary of Genoa at the age of 20 and later studied theology at the Theological Faculty of Northern Italy (Genoa Section). He was ordained a priest of the Archdiocese of Genoa on 29 June 1983.

From 1983 to 1989 he was parish vicar of San Giacomo Maggiore in Genoa Pontedecimo and he taught religion. From 1989 to 1996 he served the parish of San Giovanni Battista in Genoa Sestri Pontoise. In 1994 he became a member of the Commission for the Permanent Diaconate and in 1995 he became a spiritual guide at the minor seminary. In 1996 he was appointed Chancellor General and a member of the Diocesan Presbyteral Council, Secretary of the Episcopal Council, and a member of the commission for the borders of the Archdiocese of Genoa. From 1998 to 2004 he was a regular canon of the Cathedral Chapter and from 2001 to 2004 he was spiritual director of the Archiepiscopal Seminary. He was assistant to the lay Oblates of the archdiocese for the central area and a member of the boards of directors of several foundations, including the Opera Pia "Albergo dei Fanciulli".

Pope John Paul II named him titular bishop of Fondi and auxiliary bishop of the archdiocese of Genoa on 18 December 2004. He received episcopal consecration on 16 January 2005 from Cardinal Tarcisio Bertone.

On 20 October 2012, Pope Benedict XVI named him bishop of La Spezia-Sarzana-Brugnato.
