= Silvestro Benedetti =

Italian Roman Catholic prelate

Most Reverend Silvestro Benedetti
- Bishop of Luni e Sarzana
- Church: Catholic Church
- Diocese: Diocese of Luni e Sarzana
- In office: 1497–1537
- Predecessor: Tommaso Benedetti (bishop)
- Successor: Giovanni Francesco Pogliasca

Personal details
- Died: 1537

Silvestro Benedetti (died 1537) was a Roman Catholic prelate who served as Bishop of Luni e Sarzana (1497–1537).

== Biography ==
On 28 Apr 1497, Silvestro Benedetti was appointed during the papacy of Pope Alexander VI as Bishop of Luni e Sarzana. He served as Bishop of Luni e Sarzana until his death in 1537.

== See also ==
- Catholic Church in Italy

== External links and additional sources ==
- Cheney, David M. "Diocese of La Spezia-Sarzana-Brugnato". Catholic-Hierarchy.org. (for Chronology of Bishops) ^{[self-published]}
- Chow, Gabriel. "Titular Episcopal See of Luni (Italy)". GCatholic.org. (for Chronology of Bishops) ^{[self-published]}

Catholic Church titles
Preceded by Tommaso Benedetti (bishop)	Bishop of Luni e Sarzana; 1497–1537	Succeeded by Giovanni Francesco Pogliasca
