= Simone Pasqua =

Italian Roman Catholic bishop and cardinal

Simone Pasqua (1492–1565) was an Italian Roman Catholic bishop and cardinal. He was first appointed Bishop of Luni e Sarzana in Italy in 1561 and then Cardinal-Priest of Santa Sabina in 1565. He became Cardinal-Priest of San Pancrazio in 1565.

== Early life ==
Pasqua was born in Taggia on 17 November 1492. He studied medicine, Christian theology, and earned a doctorate in Latin and Greek.

== Career ==
Early in his ecclesiastical career, he was a cleric in Genoa. The pope made him papal ambassador to the Republic of Genoa. The pope then despatched him as the pope's ambassador to congratulate Philip II of Spain on his marriage to Mary I of England. Pope Pius IV, who had known Pasqua since childhood, made Pasqua the pope's personal physician.

On 14 February 1561 he was elected to be Bishop of Luni-Sarzana and he was subsequently consecrated as a bishop. He attended the Council of Trent 1562–63, having arrived in Trento on 1 December 1561.

Pope Pius IV made him a cardinal priest in the consistory of 12 March 1565. He received the red hat and the titular church of Santa Sabina on 15 May 1565 On 4 September 1565 he opted for the titular church of San Pancrazio.

== Death ==
He died in the Apostolic Palace on 4 September 1565. He was buried in San Pancrazio; his remains were later transferred to Santa Maria della Pace.

Catholic Church titles
Preceded by Giovanni Francesco Pogliasca	Bishop of Luni e Sarzana; 1561–1565	Succeeded by Benedetto Lomellini
Preceded by Antonio Ghislieri	Cardinal-Priest of Santa Sabina; 1565	Succeeded by Stanislaw Hosius
Preceded by Stanislaw Hosius	Cardinal-Priest of San Pancrazio; 1565	Succeeded by Tolomeo Gallio
