= Diocese of La Spezia-Sarzana-Brugnato =

Catholic diocese in Italy

Diocese of La Spezia-Sarzana-Brugnato Dioecesis Spediensis-Sarzanensis-Brugnatensis

Catholic
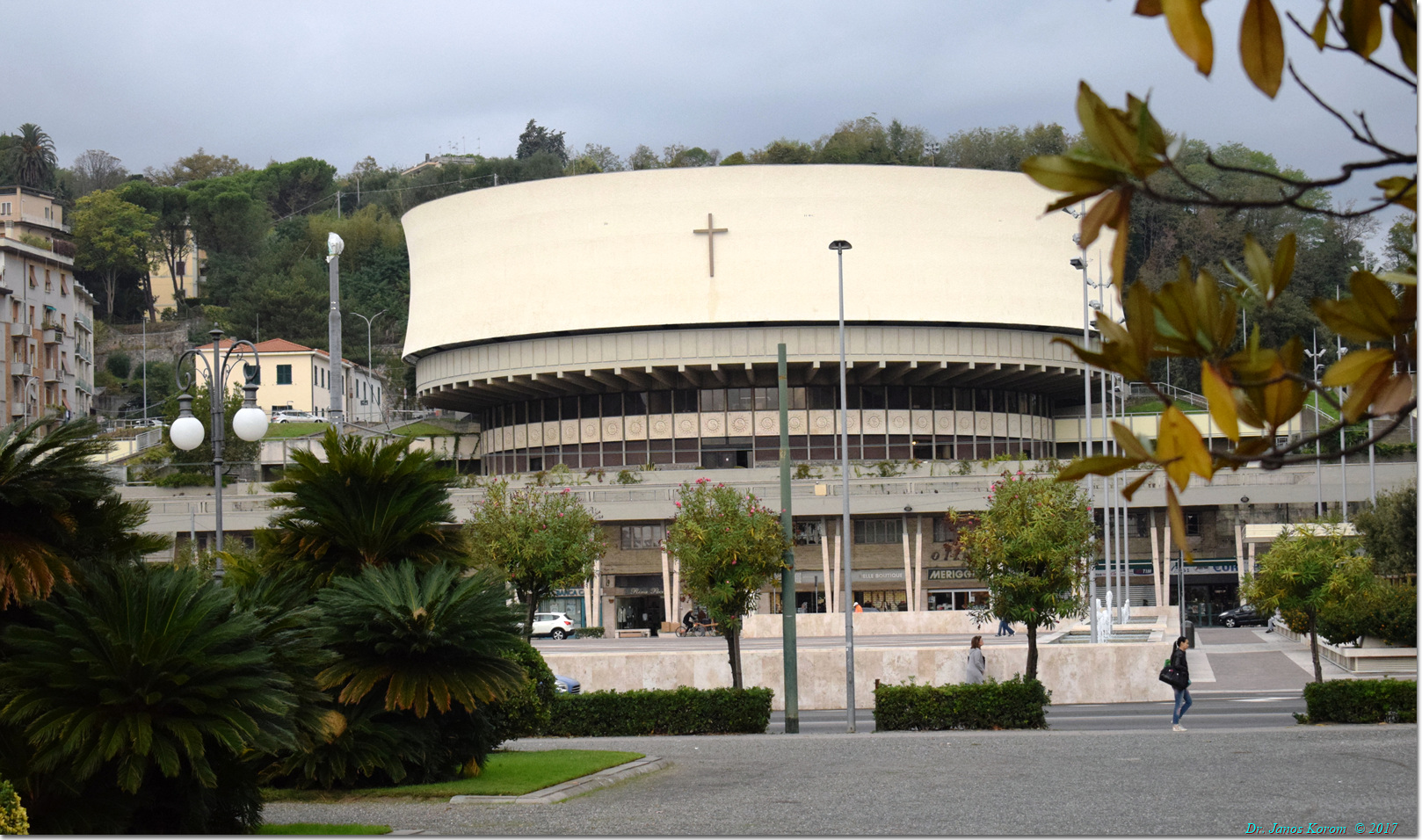
- La Spezia Cathedral

Location
- Country: Italy
- Ecclesiastical province: Genoa

Statistics
- Area: 881 km^{2} (340 sq mi)
- Population: Total; Catholics: (as of 2016); 221,263; 219,024 (98.8%)
- Parishes: 186

Information
- Denomination: Catholic Church
- Sui iuris church: Latin Church
- Rite: Roman Rite
- Established: 5th century
- Cathedral: Cattedrale di Cristo Re (La Spezia)
- Co-cathedral: Concattedrale Basilica di S. Maria Assunta (Sarzana); Cattedrale di S. Pietro, S. Lorenzo e S. Colombano (Brugnato)
- Secular priests: 103 (diocesan); 30 (Religious Orders); 19 Permanent Deacons

Current leadership
- Pope: Leo XIV
- Bishop: Luigi Palletti

Map
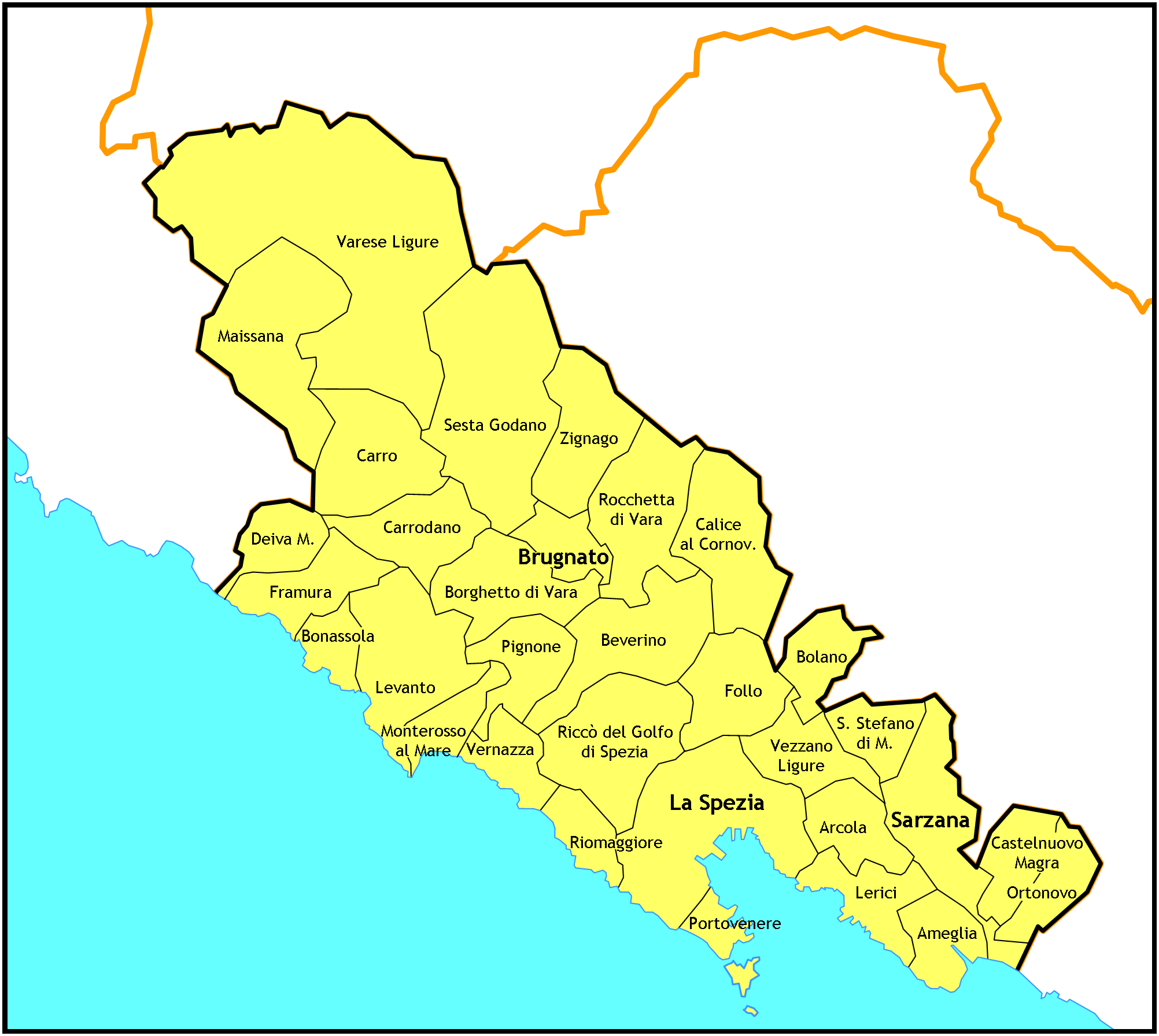

Website
- Diocesi della Spezia-Sarzana-Brugnato

The Diocese of La Spezia-Sarzana-Brugnato (Latin: Dioecesis Spediensis-Sarzanensis-Brugnatensis) is a Latin Church diocese of the Catholic Church in Liguria, northern Italy, created in 1929. It is a suffragan of the Archdiocese of Genoa.

The historic diocese of Luni (earlier Luna) was united to the Diocese of Sarzana in 1465, and then to the Diocese of Brugnato in 1820, to form the current diocese; its name has been changed more than once. The diocese of La Spezia was created on 12 January 1929 by Pope Pius XI, with which he joined the diocese of Luni-Sarzana and Brugnato aeque personaliter.

The title of Luni was dropped from the name of the diocese on 12 August 1975, which became La Spezia, Sarzana and Brugnato. The dioceses were amalgamated into one diocese in 1986.

The name Luni has been reserved since 1975 as the title of a titular diocese.

The current bishop is Luigi Palletti, who was appointed by Pope Benedict XVI on October 20, 2012.

== History ==
The Luni (Lunae) of the Ligurian coast is sometimes confused. It was the Luni (Luna) in Tuscany near Magra (Etruria annonaria), and another Luni (Luna) was located near Blera (Tuscania suburbicaria). An alleged early bishop of the 4th century (or the 7th) named Basilius has no documentary support. The same may be said of a Salorius (or Salarius). A real Bishop Felix, who attended the Roman synod of Pope Hilarius belongs to c. 465.

The episcopal see of Luni dates at least from the fifth century. In the late sixth century are found Bishop Terentius and Bishop Venantius, the recipient of a number of mandates of Gregory the Great. Under Bishop Felerandus, in the 8th century, the purported relic of the Blood of Christ is said to have been brought to Luni.

In 641 the town of Luni was attacked by the Lombard king Rothari, who had the houses, walls, and towers destroyed. The inhabitants fled. When Rothari departed, the survivors returned and rebuilt, but in 849 the Saracens attacked and destroyed virtually everything. Recovery was assisted by the Carolingians and then the Ottonians. Bishop Ceccardus (860 or 892) was murdered by barbarians. The Saracens returned in 1016 and again wrought complete devastation. On 26 May 1133 Pope Innocent II removed the territory of Brugnato from the diocese of Luni and erected it into a separate diocese.

=== Move to Sarzana ===
On 30 June 1183, the Emperor Frederick Barbarossa granted Bishop Pietro the county of Luni, the shoreline, and the port of Amelia (Ameglia).

Bishop Walterius (1193–1212) and the magistrates of Sarzana engaged in extensive consultations to make explicit all of their mutual rights and obligations as the Bishop moved his official seat to Sarzana, where in fact the bishops had been living for some time. The pact was signed on 24 June 1201. Bishop Walterius and the Canons of the Cathedral also negotiated a pact, which was approved by Pope Innocent III on 7 March 1202 in the bull In eminenti sedis.

On 25 March 1204, Pope Innocent III confirmed the transfer of the seat of the diocese of Luni to the town of Sarzana. In 1217, Pope Honorius III removed the territory of Porto Venere from the diocese of Luni and assigned it to Genoa.

When Luni was abandoned, the episcopal see was fixed at Sarzana, then at Sarzanello, and finally at Castelnuovo.

In October 1254, Bishop Guglielmo approved the transfer to Nicolò Fieschi the castles of Tivegna and Castiglione, and the woods of Padivarmo; the grants were confirmed in the same month by Pope Innocent IV. In June 1257, Pope Alexander IV authorized Cardinal Ottobono Fieschi of Genoa, the nephew of Pope Innocent IV (Fieschi), to act as judge in all pending and future cases involving litigation between the bishop of Luni and the commune of Sarzana. On 4 June 1259, the Podestà and councilors of Sarzana to represent them in litigation with the Bishop of Luni before Cardinal Ottobono. On 30 July 1260, Cardinal Ottobono found in favor of Bishop Marsucco (1213–1221).

In 1306 Dante went to Sarzana, and succeeded in settling a dispute between Bishop Antonio Camulla and the Marchese Franceschino Malaspina, the most important of the diocese's vassals. The poet's sojourn here inspired a few terzine of the Divine Comedy.

On 13 February 1355 Emperor Charles IV conferred on the bishops of Luni the title of prince of the Holy Roman Empire. Antonio M. Parentuccelli (1495), a cousin of Pope Nicholas V, built the episcopal palace and the church of S. Maria delle Grazie.

=== Cathedral and Chapter ===
The original cathedral in Luni had been dedicated to the Virgin Mary. In December 1187, Pope Gregory VIII granted the petition of the Bishop and Canons of Luni to transfer the episcopal seat to Sarzana, but he died before the transaction could be completed. The transfer was finally accomplished with the consent of Innocent III in 1204. The Cathedral church in Sarzana was dedicated to S. Basilio, and later to the Assumption of the Body of the Blessed Virgin Mary into Heaven.

The Chapter of the Cathedral was composed of two dignities, the Archdeacon and the Provost, and twenty Canons. In addition, there was a Theological Prebend and a Penitentiary Prebend. In 1709 there were only thirteen Canons; in 1757 there were fourteen.

=== Synods ===
A diocesan synod was an irregular but important meeting of the bishop of a diocese and his clergy. Its purpose was (1) to proclaim generally the various decrees already issued by the bishop; (2) to discuss and ratify measures on which the bishop chose to consult with his clergy; (3) to publish statutes and decrees of the diocesan synod, of the provincial synod, and of the Holy See.

Bishop Thomas de Benedictis (1485–1497) presided over a diocesan synod in 1494.

Cardinal Benedetto Lomellini (1565–1572) held a diocesan synod. A synod was held by Bishop Giovanni Battista Bracelli (1572–1590) on 12 September 1582. Bishop Giovanni Battista Salvago (1590–1632) held his first diocesan synod in 1591; at this synod association between Christians and Jews was prohibited, and it was demanded that Jews wear a garment of yellow (crocei coloris) to identify them. His second synod took place in 1595, and his third in 1596.

On 4 May 1642, Bishop Prospero Spínola (1637–1664) presided at a diocesan synod. Bishop Giovanni Battista Spínola (1665–1694) held a diocesan synod on 8–10 April 1674.

In 1702 Bishop Giovanni Girolamo Naselli (1695–1709) presided over a diocesan synod. On 6–8 June 1717, Bishop Ambrogio Spinola (1710–1726) held a diocesan synod.

=== Seminary ===
The Council of Trent, in its 23rd Session, meeting on 15 July 1563, issued a decree, the 18th chapter of which required that every diocese have a seminary for the training of clergy.

On 6 September 1601, the Canons of the Cathedral named a representative to the committee to prepare the plans of the seminary which had been ordered by Bishop Salvago in his diocesan synod of 1595. It was erected on the north side of the cathedral property. In 1605 the Bishop was able to report to the pope that a seminary had been erected. In accordance with the decisions of his synod of 1717, Bishop Ambrogio Spinola repaired and enlarged the building. Bishop Francesco Agnini (1837–1853) erected the chapel and donated his library of 2,000 volumes.

=== Nineteenth Century ===
In 1787 the diocese of Pontremoli, and in 1821 the diocese of Massa Ducale were separated from Luni-Sarzana, but the diocese of Brugnato, separated from Luni by Pope Innocent II in 1133, was added by Pope Pius VII on 25 November 1820 in the Bull Sollicita. The diocese of Luni-Sarzana was directly subject to the Holy See, but Brugnato was a suffragan of Genoa.

Pope Pius VI died in exile and imprisoned by the French Directory at Valence in August 1799. When the Directory had been overthrown, and in 1802, with the permission of First Consul Napoleon Bonaparte, the Pope's remains were being returned to Rome, the funeral cortege passed through Sarzana. On 2 February a solemn funeral Mass was sung in the Cathedral by Archbishop Giuseppe Maria Spina, who had accompanied Pius throughout his ordeal.

Since 1975 the title of "Bishop of Luni" was dismissed and became a titular see.

== Bishops ==
=== Diocese of Luni ===
...

- Victor (attested 503, 504)

...

- Venantius (attested 593–604)

...

- Thomas (attested 649)

...

- Severus (c. 680)

...

- Fileradus (attested 769)

...

- Petroaldus (attested 826)

...

- Teudolasius (attested 867)
- Gualterius (attested 881)
- Cecardus (c. 892–c. 895)
- Odelbertus (c. 899–941)

...

- Adalbertus (attested 950, 963, 968)
- Gotefredus (c. 976, 981, 998)

...

- Guido (c. 1020–after 1027)
- Deodatus (c. 1027–1033)
- Heribertus (attested 1039)
- Guido (attested 1055, 1060, 1076, 1078)
- ? Lazzaro (attested 1085)
- Filippo (attested 1095, 1096)
- Andreas (attested 1124)
- Filippo
- Gotefredus (1129–1156)
- Raimundus (attested 1168)
- Pipinus de Arrighis (attested 1170, 1173, 1174, 1176)
- Petrus (attested 1178–1183)
- Rolandus (attested 1191)
- Gualterius (1193–1212)
- Marsucco (1213–1221)
- Noradinus (1221–1224)
- Buttafava (1224-1228)
- Guglielmo (1228–1270)
- Gotifredus (1271–1273)
- Henricus de Fucecchio (1273–1297)
- Antonio Camulla (1297–1309)

Sede vacante (1309–1312)

- Gerardino Malaspina (1312–1320)
- Bernabo Malaspina (1320–1338)
- Antonio Fieschi (1338–1343)
- Agapito Colonna (1344)
- Giordano Colonna (1344–1351)
- Gabriele Malaspina (1351–1359?)
- Barnabas Griffi (1363–1378)
- Jacobus Campana, O.P. (1378-1380)
- Jacobus Piccolomini
- Gerardus Pasqualoni
- Francesco Lante, O.Min.
- Martino de Ferrari
- Giovanni Montino
- Andrea, O.P.
- Giacomo de Rossi
- Francesco Pietrasanta Manfredi (1415–1465)

=== Diocese of Luni e Sarzana ===
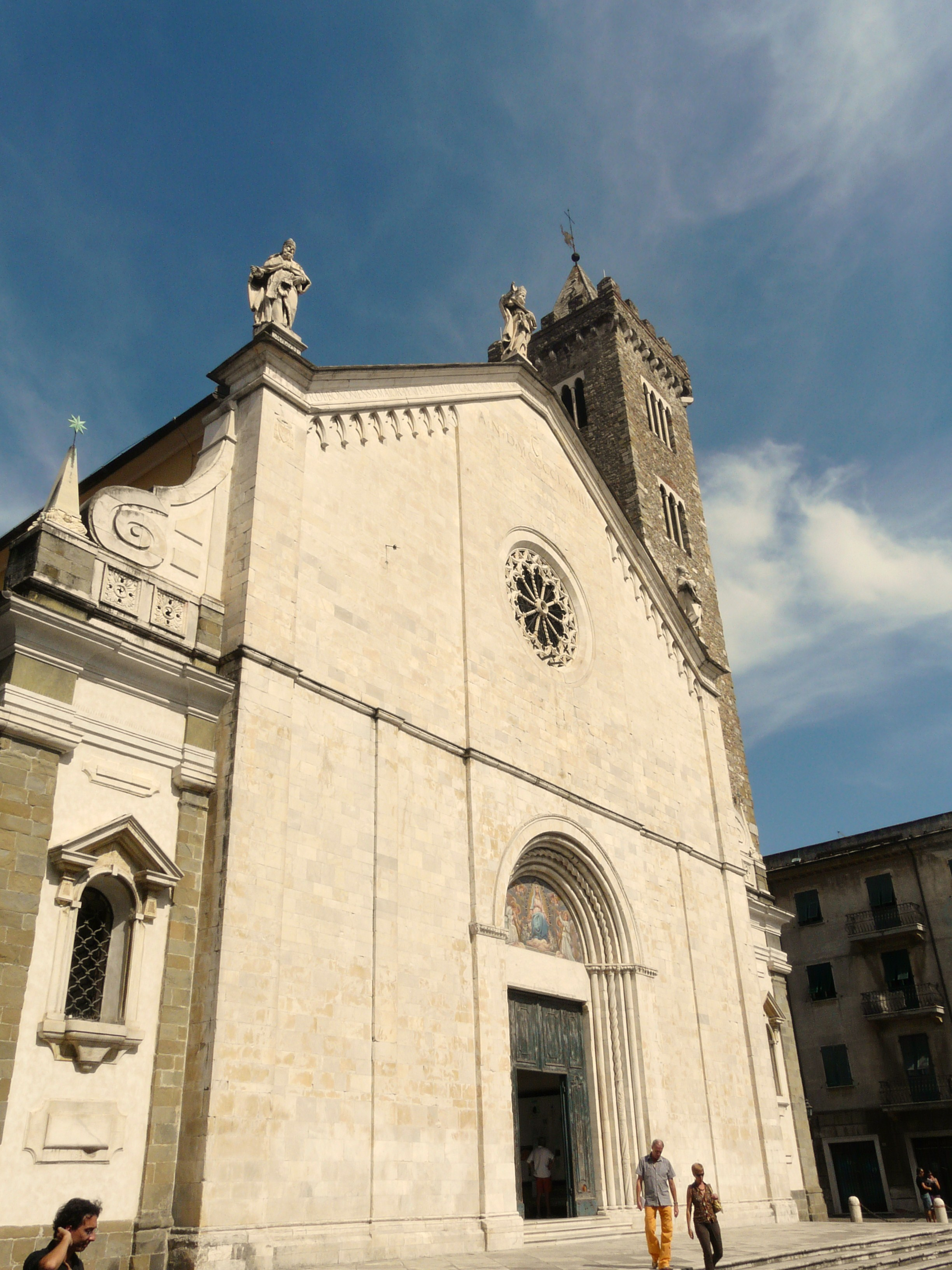
Sarzana Cathedral

- Francesco Pietrasanta Manfredi (1465–1469)
- Antonio Maria Parentuccelli (1469–1485)
- Thomas de Benedictis (1485–1497)
- Silvestro Benedetti (1497–1537)
- Giovanni Francesco Pogliasca (1537–1561)
- Simone Pasqua (di Negro) (14 Feb 1561 – 5 Sep 1565 Died)
- Benedetto Lomellini (7 Sep 1565 – 17 Mar 1572 Appointed, Bishop of Anagni)
- Giovanni Battista Bracelli (bishop) (2 Jun 1572 – 17 Apr 1590 Died)
- Giovanni Battista Salvago (14 May 1590 – 24 Jan 1632 Died)
- Cardinal Giovanni Domenico Spinola (1632–1636)
- Prospero Spínola (1637–1664)
- Giovanni Battista Spínola (1665–1694)
- Giovanni Girolamo Naselli (1695–1709)
- Ambrogio Spinola, B. (10 Mar 1710 – 29 Jun 1726 Resigned)
- Giovanni Girolamo della Torre, B. (1 Jul 1726 – 21 Apr 1757 Died)
- Giulio Cesare Lomellino, C.R. (1757–1791)
- Francesco Maria Gentile (1791–1795)
- Vincenzo Maria Maggioli, O.P. (1795–1804)
- Giulio Cesare Pallavicini (24 Sep 1804 – 13 May 1819 Died)

=== Diocese of Luni, Sarzana e Brugnato ===
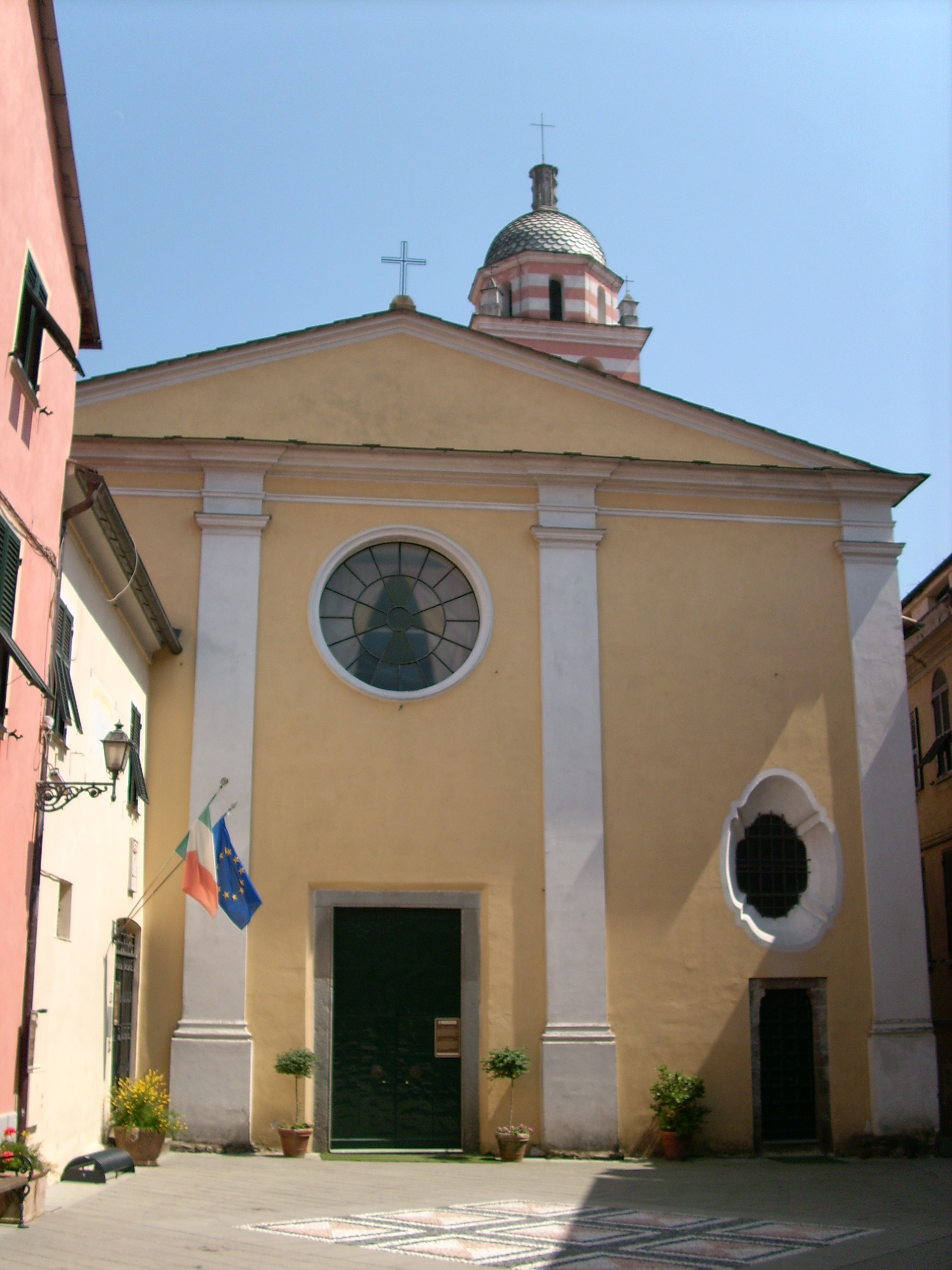
Brugnato Cathedral

United: 25 November 1820 with the Diocese of Brugnato

- Pio Luigi Scarabelli, C.M. (1820–1836)
- Francesco Agnini (19 May 1837 Confirmed – 8 Mar 1853 Died)
- Giuseppe Rosati (22 Feb 1867 – 5 Sep 1881 Died)
- Giacinto Rossi, O.P. (18 Nov 1881 – 29 Jan 1899 Died)
- Giovanni Carli (19 Jun 1899 – 5 Jan 1921 Died)
- Bernardo Pizzorno (7 Mar 1921 – 6 Aug 1926 Died)

=== Diocese of Luni o La Spezia, Sarzana e Brugnato ===
Name Changed: 12 January 1929
Latin Name: Lunensis o Spediensis, Sarzanensis, et Brugnatensis
Metropolitan: Archdiocese of Genoa

- Giovanni Costantini (8 Feb 1929 – 26 Jul 1943 Resigned)
- Giuseppe Stella (7 Sep 1945 – 3 Sep 1975 Retired), last diocesan Bishop titled "of Luni" (since 1975, "Bishop of Luni" is a titular see)

=== Diocese of La Spezia-Sarzana-Brugnato ===
- Siro Silvestri (3 Sep 1975 – 7 Dec 1989 Retired)
- Giulio Sanguineti (7 Dec 1989 – 19 Dec 1998 Appointed, Bishop of Brescia)
- Bassano Staffieri (10 Jul 1999 – 6 Dec 2007 Retired)
- Francesco Moraglia (6 Dec 2007 – 31 Jan 2012 Appointed, Patriarch of Venice)
- Luigi Ernesto Palletti (20 Oct 2012 – )

== Parishes ==
The diocese has 186 parishes, all within the Province of La Spezia in Liguria.

== See also ==
- Lunigiana

== Books ==
=== Reference works for bishops ===
- Gams, Pius Bonifatius (1873). Series episcoporum Ecclesiae catholicae: quotquot innotuerunt a beato Petro apostolo. Ratisbon: Typis et Sumptibus Georgii Josephi Manz. pp. 817–818. (Use with caution; obsolete)
- Eubel, Conradus, ed. (1913). Hierarchia catholica (in Latin). Vol. 1 (second ed.). Münster: Libreria Regensbergiana.
- Eubel, Conradus, ed. (1914). Hierarchia catholica (in Latin). Vol. 2 (second ed.). Münster: Libreria Regensbergiana.
- Eubel, Conradus; Gulik, Guilelmus (1923). Hierarchia catholica (in Latin). Vol. 3 (second ed.). Münster: Libreria Regensbergiana.
- Gauchat, Patritius (Patrice) (1935). Hierarchia catholica (in Latin). Vol. IV (1592-1667). Münster: Libraria Regensbergiana.
- Ritzler, Remigius; Sefrin, Pirminus (1952). Hierarchia catholica medii et recentis aevi (in Latin). Vol. V (1667-1730). Patavii: Messagero di S. Antonio.
- Ritzler, Remigius; Sefrin, Pirminus (1958). Hierarchia catholica medii et recentis aevi (in Latin). Vol. VI (1730-1799). Patavii: Messagero di S. Antonio.
- Ritzler, Remigius; Sefrin, Pirminus (1968). Hierarchia Catholica medii et recentioris aevi sive summorum pontificum, S. R. E. cardinalium, ecclesiarum antistitum series... A pontificatu Pii PP. VII (1800) usque ad pontificatum Gregorii PP. XVI (1846) (in Latin). Vol. VII. Monasterii: Libr. Regensburgiana.
- Remigius Ritzler; Pirminus Sefrin (1978). Hierarchia catholica Medii et recentioris aevi... A Pontificatu PII PP. IX (1846) usque ad Pontificatum Leonis PP. XIII (1903) (in Latin). Vol. VIII. Il Messaggero di S. Antonio.
- Pięta, Zenon (2002). Hierarchia catholica medii et recentioris aevi... A pontificatu Pii PP. X (1903) usque ad pontificatum Benedictii PP. XV (1922) (in Latin). Vol. IX. Padua: Messagero di San Antonio. ISBN 978-88-250-1000-8.

=== Studies ===
- Callegari, Domenico (1866). Memoria storica della diocesi di Luni-Sarzana (in Italian). Pisa: Stamperia Valenti.
- Cappelletti, Giuseppe (1857). Le chiese d'Italia della loro origine sino ai nostri giorni (in Italian). Vol. decimoterzo (13). Venezia: Giuseppe Antonelli. pp. 422–486.
- Gentile, Michele Lupo (1912). Il Regesto del Codice Pelavicino in: Atti della Società ligure di storia patria, Vol. XLIV (Genova 1912).
- Kehr, Paul Fridolin (1914). Italia pontificia : sive, Repertorium privilegiorum et litterarum a romanis pontificibus ante annum 1598 Italiae ecclesiis, monasteriis, civitatibus singulisque personis concessorum. Vol. VI. pars ii. Berolini: Weidmann. pp. 373–392. (in Latin)
- Lallai, Mariano (2015). La diocesi di Lucca. Da Luni a Massa Carrara-Pontremoli. Il divenire di una diocesi fra Toscana e Liguria dal IV al XXI secolo (in Italian). Massa: Lallai Mariano. ISBN 9788894050608.
- Lanzoni, Francesco (1927). Le diocesi d'Italia dalle origini al principio del secolo VII (an. 604). Faenza: F. Lega, pp. 586–589. (in Italian)
- Schwartz, Gerhard (1907). Die Besetzung der Bistümer Reichsitaliens unter den sächsischen und salischen Kaisern: mit den Listen der Bischöfe, 951-1122. Leipzig: B.G. Teubner. (in German)
- Semeria, Giovanni Battista (1843). Secoli cristiani della Liguria, ossia, Storia della metropolitana di Genova, delle diocesi di Sarzana, di Brugnato, Savona, Noli, Albegna e Ventimiglia (in Italian). Vol. I. Torino: Tip. Chirio e Mina. Semeria, Giovanni Battista (1843). Volume II. [II, pp. 2–156; 156-159; 159-184]
- Ughelli, Ferdinando (1717). Niccolò Coleti (ed.). Italia sacra sive De episcopis Italiæ, et insularum adjacentium (in Latin) (nova ed.). apud Sebastianum Coleti. pp. 833–856. [Luni and Sarzana]
- Ughelli, Ferdinando; Coleti, Niccolo (1719). Italia sacra, sive de episcopis Italiae et insularum adjacentium (in Latin). Vol. Tomus quartus (4) (2nd ed.). Venice: Apud Sebastianum Coleti. pp. 979–998. [Brugnato]
