= Bassano Staffieri =

Italian bishop

- Emerit Bishop of Roman Catholic Diocese of La Spezia-Sarzana-Brugnato
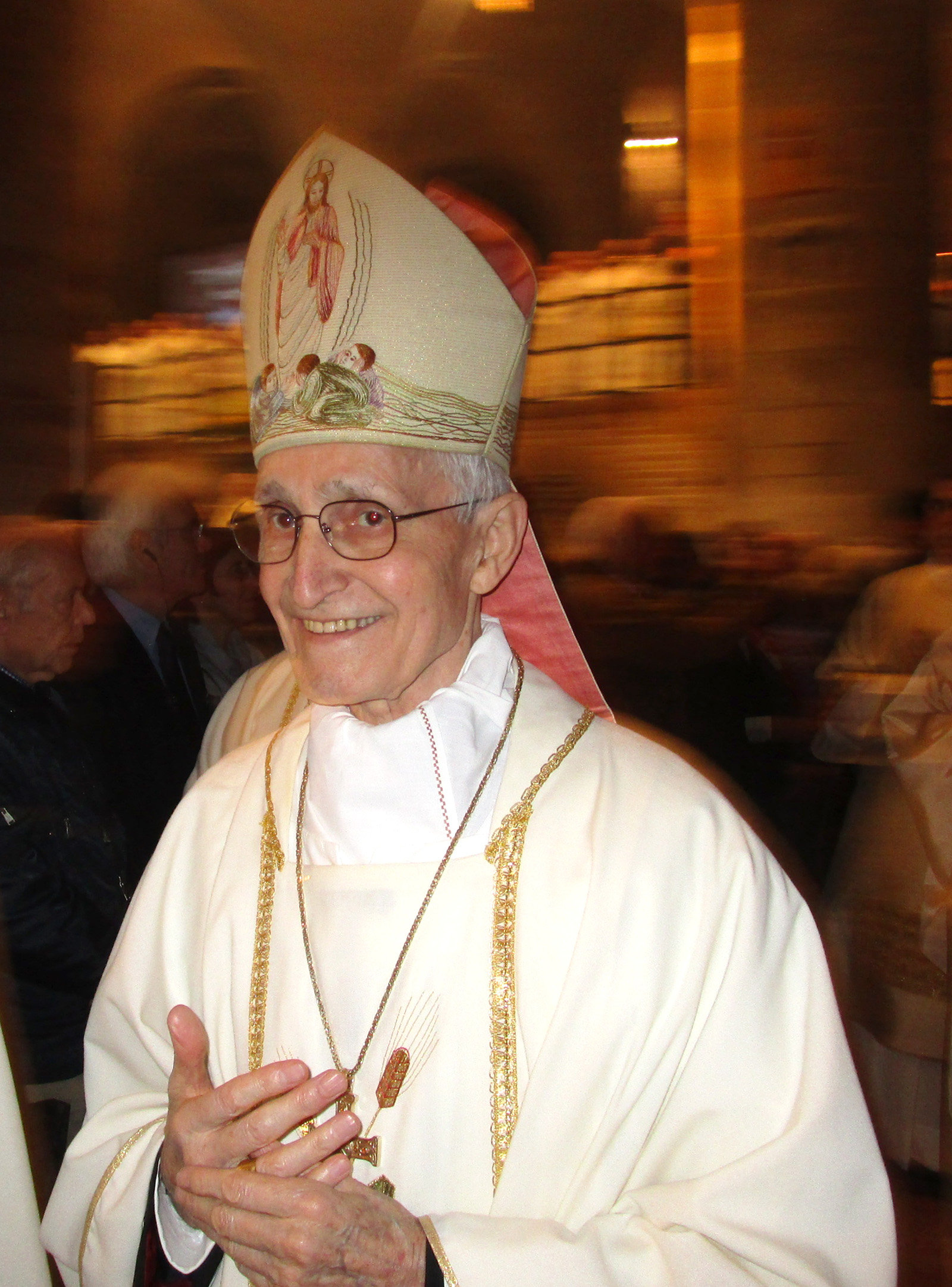
- Bishop Staffieri on 26 October 2014
- Church: Roman Catholic Church
- See: Diocese of La Spezia-Sarzana-Brugnato
- In office: 1999–2008
- Predecessor: Giulio Sanguineti
- Successor: Francesco Moraglia

Orders
- Ordination: 9 June 1955

Personal details
- Born: 6 September 1931; Casalpusterlengo, Italy
- Died: 31 July 2018 (aged 86); La Spezia, Italy

Nino Staffieri (6 September 1931 – 31 July 2018) was an Italian bishop of the Roman Catholic Diocese of La Spezia-Sarzana-Brugnato.

He was ordained a priest on 9 June 1955.

He was appointed bishop of Carpi on 11 July 1989, receiving his episcopal consecration on 9 September, 1989 from Cardinal Ugo Poletti.

He was appointed bishop of La Spezia-Sarzana-Brugnato on 10 July 1999.

Staffieri retired as bishop on 6 December 2007, and at the time of his death was vice-president of the Episcopal Conference of Liguria.
