= Alessandro Guidiccioni =

Alessandro Guidiccioni may refer to:

- Alessandro Guidiccioni (iuniore) (1557–1637), Italian Roman Catholic bishop
- Alessandro Guidiccioni (seniore) (died 1605), Italian Roman Catholic bishop
