= Bartolomeo Guidiccioni =

His Eminence Bartolomeo Guidiccioni
- Bishop of Lucca
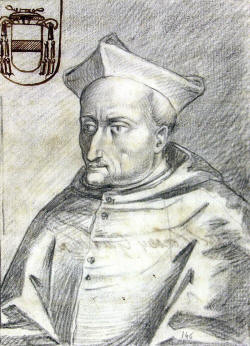
- Church: Catholic Church
- Diocese: Lucca
- Appointed: 26 May 1546
- Term ended: 4 November 1549
- Predecessor: Francesco Sforza Riario
- Successor: Alessandro Guidiccioni
- Other posts: Cardinal-Priest of Santa Prisca (1543-1549)
- Previous posts: Administrator of Teramo (1539-1542); Cardinal-Priest of San Cesareo de Appia (1540-1543); Camerlengo of the College of Cardinals (1547-1548)

Orders
- Consecration: 28 August 1546 by Rodolfo Pio da Carpi
- Created cardinal: 19 December 1539 by Pope Paul III
- Rank: Cardinal-Priest

Personal details
- Born: 1470 Lucca, Italy
- Died: 4 November 1549 (aged 78–79) Rome, Papal States
- Buried: Lucca Cathedral
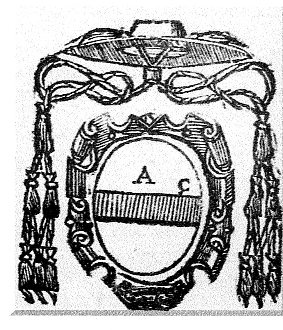
- Coat of arms

Bartolomeo Guidiccioni (1470 – 4 November 1549) was an Italian Roman Catholic bishop and cardinal. He was one of the closest collaborators of Cardinal Alessandro Farnese, both as Bishop of Parma and afterwards when he became Pope Paul III. He served the pope as Vicar of Rome, and Prefect of the Tribunal of the Signature of Justice, as well as a member of several ad hoc commissions of cardinals. He was Bishop of Teramo (1539–1542) and Bishop of Lucca (1546–1549). He was one of the organizers and leading officers of the Council of Trent.

== Biography ==
Bartolomeo Guidiccioni was born in Lucca in 1470, the son of a patrician family. At the age of nineteen, his father sent him to study at the University of Pisa and the University of Bologna, where he studied civil law for seven years. At the conclusion of his studies, he returned to Lucca, intending to practice law, but the town was oversupplied with lawyers and he could not establish a practice. He therefore went to Rome, where he was disappointed to discover that civil law meant little, in contrast to Canon Law and the rules of the Apostolic Chancery. His lack of funds made study difficult. Finally, through the influence of Felinus Sandaeus, a jurisconsult and Auditor of the Rota, he obtained a position in the household of Cardinal Franciotto Galeotto della Rovere, the nephew of Pope Julius II. Guidiccioni also became the governor of Farfa Abbey between 1506 and 1508, but he was dismissed in 1508 a few months before the Cardinal's death. He studied the human sciences, theology, and law in Rome. He became a Protonotary Apostolic.

=== Vicar-General of Parma ===
At Rome, he entered the household of Cardinal Alessandro Farnese, seniore, the future Pope Paul III. On 28 March 1509, Cardinal Farnese was named Bishop of Parma by Pope Julius II. On 8 November 1509 he appointed Guidiccioni to be his vicar general in the diocese. His most notable action as vicar came as a result of the condemnation of a witch to be burned at the stake. When she was handed over to the civil government of Parma to carry out the sentence, the Podestà refused, even under threat of excommunication to burn the victim, the Inquisitor of Parma appealed to the vicar general, who supported him. The Podestà appealed to the government in Milan, which supported the Vicar and Inquisitor, and the woman was burned. Guidiccioni also supported the principle of the exemption of the clergy from the jurisdiction of the civil courts. He issued a vigorous decision in October 1513, which the city felt compelled to appeal to the Pope. Pope Leo X firmly supported Guidiccioni. In 1516 Cardinal Farnese came to Parma, and conducted a formal visitation and issued a new set of constitutions. When he returned to Rome, the Vicar General Guidiccioni continued the visitations down through October 1516. Farnese returned in 1519, and held a diocesan synod in November. Guidiccioni held the post of vicar general for a total of nineteen years. In 1528 he returned to Parma, and then retired to a villa in Carignano. In 1529, Cardinal Farnese visited Lucca during a trip to Genoa, and stayed at the house of the Guidiccioni. He also visited the retreat at Carignano several times.

On the election of Cardinal Farnese as Pope Paul III on 13 October 1534, Guidiccioni was sent by the city of Lucca to Rome as one of the members of its congratulatory embassy. He returned to Lucca, but on 3 February 1535 Paul III wrote to him, summoning him to Rome. He was in Rome from March until May, consulting about Paul's plans for a general council of the Church. He returned to Lucca, where he worked on his treatises De bonis et rebus donatis ecclesiae and De annatis, beneficiis ecclesiasticis, spoliis, taxis, compositionibus. This was an important reform work, intended to help the Pope in preparing the agenda for the council. But Pope Paul wanted him in Rome. Guidiccioni wrote to the Pope, Luca vale, revocat nos marcia curia, Paulus sic iubet, en iussus non rediturus. Guidiccioni served as a datary from spring 1536 to 1539. On 23 July 1536, he was appointed, along with Cardinals Sadoleto, Cortese, Fregoso, Giberti and Carafa, to make preparations for the council. In August, however, he asked to resign, and on 17 August the Pope consented.

=== Bishop and Cardinal ===
In November 1539 Guidiccioni was named Papal Vicar, in place of the recently deceased Paolo Capizucchi, and took up the office on 28 November. He served as Papal Vicar of Rome from 1539 to 1542. Guidiccioni was elected bishop of Teramo on 12 December 1539. He was not consecrated a bishop until 1546, and was therefore termed Administrator of the diocese of Teramo. He did not visit the diocese during his episcopacy, but governed through a vicar general, Msgr. Giubbileo Arca, Canon of Narni, assisted by economi and procurators. Arca was succeeded by Giovanni Francesco Corradi. Guidiccioni resigned on 22 March 1542.

One week after he was named Bishop of Teramo, the pope made him a cardinal priest in the consistory of 19 December 1539. He received the red hat and the titular church of San Cesareo in Palatio on 28 January 1540.

In September 1539, he was appointed a member of a congregation of three cardinals to approve the establishment of the Society of Jesus. He was a dissenting voice on the congregation, questioning whether yet another religious order was needed or appropriate, and whether it might lead to strife rather than harmony. But after the pope issued the papal bull Regimini militantis Ecclesiae approving the order, Cardinal Guidiccioni became a strong supporter.

On 17 February 1540, Pope Paul III named Cardinal Guidiccioni to the office of Prefect of the Signature of Justice (a court of appeal in the Roman Curia). On 27 August 1540, he was named along with Cardinal Alessandro Cesarini and Cardinal Giovanni Maria Ciocchi del Monte to a commission to study reform of the Roman Rota.

=== Offices in the Roman Curia ===
On 22 March 1542, he resigned the government of Teramo because his duties in Rome made him unable to visit it. On 21 July 1542, following the issue of his Bull Licet ab initio, Pope Paul named six cardinals, Gian Pietro Carafa, Juan Alvarez de Toledo, Pier Paolo Parisio, Bartolommeo Guidiccioni, Dionisio Laurerio, and Tommaso Badia inquisitors general of the Roman Inquisition.

On 5 January 1543, the pope named him to a commission to study church reform. On 17 March 1543, Cardinal Guidiccioni and twelve other cardinals accompanied the pope to Bologna. He was one of eight cardinals appointed on 11 May 1543 to a commission to manage the affairs of the upcoming Council of Trent.

He opted for the titular church of Santa Prisca on 24 September 1543. He served as administrator of the see of Chiusi from 2 April 1544 until 20 February 1545. On 2 November 1544, the pope officially made him a member of the upcoming Council of Trent. The council officially began on 13 December 1545.

Shortly after the start of the council, on 26 May 1546, Cardinal Guidiccioni was transferred to the see of Lucca. He finally received episcopal consecration from the hands of Cardinal Rodolfo Pio da Carpi in the Sistine Chapel on 28 August 1546, with Cristoforo Spiriti, Bishop of Cesena, and Giovanni Giacomo Barba, Bishop of Teramo, serving as co-consecrators. From 7 January 7, 1547 to 13 January 1548, he was Camerlengo of the Sacred College of Cardinals.

He also served as Major Penitentiary from 1547 to 1549.

Cardinal Guidiccioni died in Rome on 4 November 1549, six days before the death of his friend Paul III. His remains were transferred to Lucca and he was buried in Lucca Cathedral.

He was the author of numerous treatises, which are preserved in manuscript in the Barberini collection. Twenty volumes of his work on civil law and canon law are kept in the Vatican Library.

== Bibliography ==
- Cardella, Lorenzo (1793). Memorie storiche de'cardinali della santa Romana chiesa (in Italian). Vol. Tomo quatro. Roma: Pagliarini. pp. 227–230.
- Gulik, Guilelmus (1923). Eubel, Conradus (ed.). Hierarchia catholica (in Latin). Vol. Tomus 3 (second ed.). Münster: Libreria Regensbergiana.
- Palma, Niccola (1833). Storia ecclesiastica e civile della regione più settentrionale del Regno di Napoli (in Italian). Vol. III. Teramo: Angeletti. pp. 15–21.
- Schweitzer, Vinzenz (1906). "Kardinal Bartolomeo Guidiccioni (1469–1549)," Römische Quartalschrift für christliche Altertumskunde und Kirchengeschichte (in German). Rome: Herder. 1906. pp. 27–53, 142–161, 189–204.

Catholic Church titles
Preceded by Francesco Cherigatto	Bishop of Teramo; 1539–1542	Succeeded by Bernardino Silverii-Piccolomini
Preceded by Louis de Gorrevod de Challand	Cardinal-Priest of San Cesareo in Palatio; 1540–1543	Succeeded by Pier Francesco Ferrero
Preceded by Rodolfo Pio	Cardinal-Priest of Santa Prisca; 1543–1549	Succeeded by Federico Cesi (cardinal)
Preceded by Giorgio Andreasi	Administrator of Chiusi; 1544–1545	Succeeded by Giovanni Ricci
Preceded by Francesco Riario Sforza	Bishop of Lucca; 1546–1549	Succeeded by Alessandro Guidiccioni (seniore)
