= Francisco Campos =

Francisco Campos is the name of:

- Francisco Campos (baseball) (born 1972), Mexican baseball player
- Francisco Campos (jurist) (1891–1968), Brazilian cabinet minister and author of the 1937 Constitution
- Francisco Campos (footballer) (born 1912), Spanish football player for Real Madrid
- Paco Campos (Francisco Campos Salamanca, 1916–1995), Spanish football player for Atlético Madrid
- Tatica Campos (Francisco Campos Toledo, born 1892), Cuban baseball player
- Xisco Campos (Francisco Javier Campos Coll, born 1982), Spanish football player for Mallorca
- Francisco Campos (cyclist) (born 1997), Portuguese cyclist
- Francisco Campos (politician), Ecuadorian Minister of Finance 1889–1890

== See also ==
- Francisco Camps (born 1962), Spanish politician
- Francisco Camps de la Carrera y Molés, 17th-century catholic bishop
- Pancho Campo, born Francisco Armando Campo Carrasco, Chilean-Spanish businessman and wine expert
