= Rafael Ripoz =

Spanish Roman Catholic prelate (1553-1620)

Most Reverend Rafael Ripoz
- Bishop of Perpignan-Elne
- Church: Catholic Church
- In office: 1618–1620
- Predecessor: Ramón Ivorra
- Successor: Francesc Senjust

Orders
- Consecration: 25 November 1618 by Giovanni Garzia Mellini

Personal details
- Born: 1553 Barcelona, Spain
- Died: 17 December 1620 (age 67) Perpignan-Elne, France

Rafael Ripoz, O.P. (1553–1620) was a Roman Catholic prelate who served as Bishop of Perpignan-Elne (1618–1620).

== Biography ==
Rafael Ripoz was born in Barcelona, Spain, in 1553 and ordained a priest in the Order of Preachers. He was appointed Bishop of Perpignan-Elne on 12 November 1618, during the papacy of Pope Paul V. On 25 November 1618, he was consecrated bishop by Giovanni Garzia Mellini, Cardinal-Priest of Santi Quattro Coronati, with Diego Alvarez (archbishop), Archbishop of Trani, and Alessandro Guidiccioni (iuniore), Bishop of Lucca, serving as co-consecrators. He served as Bishop of Perpignan-Elne until his death on 17 December 1620.

Catholic Church titles
Preceded by Ramón Ivorra	Bishop of Perpignan-Elne; 1618–1620	Succeeded by Francesc Senjust
