= Galeotto Franciotti della Rovere =

Italian Roman Catholic bishop and cardinal

His Eminence Galeotto Franciotti della Rovere
- Bishop of Lucca
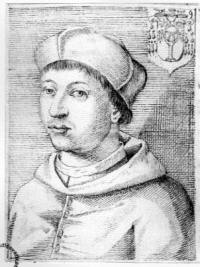
- Church: Catholic Church
- Diocese: Lucca
- Elected: October 1503
- Term ended: 11 September 1508
- Predecessor: Felino Maria Sandeo
- Successor: Sisto Gara della Rovere
- Previous posts: Cardinal-Priest of San Pietro in Vincoli (1503-1507); Administrator of Benevento (1504-1507); Administrator of Cremona (1505-1507); Administrator of Vicenza (1507)

Orders
- Consecration: 9 April 1504 by Pope Julius II
- Created cardinal: 29 November 1503 by Pope Julius II
- Rank: Cardinal-Priest

Personal details
- Born: 1471 Lucca, Italy
- Died: 11 September 1508 (aged 36–37) Rome, Papal States
- Buried: Santi Apostoli
- Coat of arms

Galeotto Franciotti della Rovere (1471 – 11 September 1508) was an Italian Roman Catholic bishop and cardinal.

== Biography ==
della Rovere was born in Lucca in 1471, the son of Francesco Franciotti and Luchina della Rovere, a member of the House of della Rovere. He was a grandnephew of Pope Sixtus IV and a nephew of Pope Julius II. His half-brother, Sisto Gara della Rovere, also became a cardinal.

He was elected Bishop of Lucca in October or November 1503 and occupied that office until his death. He was consecrated as a bishop by his uncle Pope Julius II.

Pope Julius II made him a cardinal priest in the consistory of 29 November 1503. He received the red hat and the titular church of San Pietro in Vincoli on 6 December 1503.

On 30 August 1504 he became the apostolic administrator of the see of Benevento, and filled this office until his death. He became administrator of the see of Cremona from 27 May 1505, holding that post until shortly before his death. He was Vice-Chancellor of the Holy Roman Church from 31 May 1505 until his death. In May 1506, he was papal legate to Bologna. In August 1507, he became administrator of the see of Vicenza. He was a patron of the arts and a good friend of Cardinal Giovanni de' Medici, who later became Pope Leo X.

One historian notes:

"Although Giovio states explicitly that this newly formed intimacy between the Medici and Franciotto had its origin in the diplomatic aims of the former rather than in any mutual inclination of the two young men, yet it is certain that ere long Giovanni grew deeply attached to Galeotto, and that the sorrow expressed by him at the papal nephew's sudden and premature death was both genuine and abiding, for on the testimony of Tommaso Inghirami, we learn that in after years, when the Cardinal de' Medici had been transformed into the Pontiff Leo X, he could not endure to hear Galeotto's name mentioned in his presence, and if anyone were so careless as to allude to his passed friend, the Pope would invariably turn aside his face to hide the tears he was unable to repress. And in the Medici's case this instance of real affection is of peculiar interest, for with the exception of his brother Giuliano, there exists no record of Leo showing any strong affection towards any one of his contemporaries save this nephew of Julius II."

The services of della Rovere to England as Cardinal protector are noted as the granting of a papal indulgence to John Mortymen, a chamber of official of King Henry VII, on 21 June 1506; arranging for Pope Julius II to make (on 18 August 1506) Robert Haldesworth of the Archdiocese of York a papal notary; and on Candlemas Day (15 February 1507/8), ceremoniously accepting candles blessed by the pope to give to Hugh Inge to take to the royal court. His last recorded act was to persuade the Pope to grant King Henry VII's demand to have revenues from the episcopal see of Durham diverted to the costs of repairing fortifications along the border between England and Scotland, which the Pope granted on 26 July 1508; della Rovere suddenly died less than two months later, in Rome, on 11 September 1508. He is buried in Santi Apostoli, Rome.
