= Alessandro Guidiccioni (iuniore) =

Most Reverend Alessandro Guidiccioni
- Bishop of Lucca
- Church: Catholic Church
- Diocese: Diocese of Lucca
- In office: 1600–1637
- Predecessor: Alessandro Guidiccioni (seniore)
- Successor: Marcantonio Franciotti

Orders
- Consecration: 8 December 1600 by Federico Borromeo

Personal details
- Born: 1557
- Died: 16 March 1637 (age 80) Lucca, Italy

Alessandro Guidiccioni (1557–1637) was a Roman Catholic prelate who served as Bishop of Lucca (1600–1637).

== Biography ==
Alessandro Guidiccioni was born in 1557. On 27 November 1600, he was appointed during the papacy of Pope Clement VIII as Bishop of Lucca. On 8 December 1600, he was consecrated bishop by Federico Borromeo, Archbishop of Milan, with Mario Bolognini, Archbishop of Salerno, and Lorenzo Celsi, Bishop of Castro del Lazio, serving as co-consecrators. He served as Bishop of Lucca until his death on 16 March 1637.

== Episcopal succession ==
While bishop, he was the principal co-consecrator of:

- Francesco Simonetta, Bishop of Foligno (1606);
- Berlinghiero Gessi, Bishop of Rimini (1606);
- Barzellino de' Barzellini, Bishop of Satriano e Campagna (1607);
- Sebastiano Poggi, Bishop of Ripatransone (1607);
- Alessandro Rossi, Bishop of Castro del Lazio (1611);
- Giovanni Battista de Aquena, Bishop of Bosa (1613);
- Giovanni Antonio Galderisi, Bishop of Bovino (1616);
- Michelangelo Seghizzi, Bishop of Lodi (1616);
- Innico Siscara, Bishop of Anglona-Tursi (1616);
- Lorenzo Castrucci, Bishop of Spoleto (1617);
- Paolo Emilio Santori, Archbishop of Cosenza (1617);
- Rafael Ripoz, Bishop of Perpignan-Elne (1618);
- Ascanio Castagna, Bishop of Isola (1622);
- Giulio del Pozzo, Bishop of Accia and Mariana (1622); and
- Lazzaro Carafino, Bishop of Melfi e Rapolla (1622).

Catholic Church titles
Preceded by Alessandro Guidiccioni (seniore)	Bishop of Lucca; 1600–1637	Succeeded by Marcantonio Franciotti
