= Saint Paulinus =

Saint Paulinus may refer to:

- Paulinus of Antioch, first Bishop of Lucca
- Paulinus of Nola, or Pontius Meropius Anicius Paulinus
- Paulinus of Trier (died 358), bishop of Trier and a supporter of Athanasius in the conflict with Arianism
- Paulinus of York, first Archbishop of York
- Paulinus II of Aquileia, Patriarchate of Aquileia
- Paul Aurelian or Paulinus Aurelianus, 6th-century Welshman who became first bishop of the See of Léon and one of the seven founder saints of Brittany
