= Giovanni Battista de Aquena =

Roman Catholic prelate

Most Reverend Giovanni Battista de Aquena
- Bishop of Bosa
- Church: Catholic Church
- Diocese: Diocese of Bosa
- In office: 1613–1615
- Predecessor: Juan Alvarez Zapata
- Successor: Vincenzo Bacallar (bishop)

Orders
- Consecration: 14 April 1613 by Giovanni Garzia Mellini

Personal details
- Born: 1576 Sassari, Italy
- Died: 1615 (age 39) Bosa, Italy

Giovanni Battista de Aquena (1576–1615) was a Roman Catholic prelate who served as Bishop of Bosa (1613–1615).

== Biography ==
Giovanni Battista de Aquena was born in Sassari, Italy in 1576. On 18 March 1613, he was appointed during the papacy of Pope Paul V as Bishop of Bosa. On 14 April 1613, he was consecrated bishop by Giovanni Garzia Mellini, Cardinal-Priest of Santi Quattro Coronati with Marco Cornaro, Bishop of Padua, and Alessandro Guidiccioni (iuniore), Bishop of Lucca, serving as co-consecrators. He served as Bishop of Bosa until his death in 1615.

Catholic Church titles
Preceded by Juan Alvarez Zapata	Bishop of Bosa; 1613–1615	Succeeded by Vincenzo Bacallar (bishop)
