= Marco Cornaro (1557–1625) =

Roman Catholic prelate

Most Reverend Marco Cornaro
- Bishop of Padua
- Church: Catholic Church
- In office: 1594–1625
- Predecessor: Federico Cornaro
- Successor: Pietro Valier

Orders
- Consecration: 21 December 1594 by Agostino Valier

Personal details
- Born: 1557 Venice, Republic of Venice
- Died: 11 June 1625 (age 68) Padua, Republic of Venice

Marco Cornaro also Marco Corner (1557 – 11 June 1625) was a Roman Catholic prelate who served as Bishop of Padua (1594–1625).

== Biography ==
Marco Cornaro was born in Venice, Republic of Venice in 1557. On 12 December 1594, he was appointed during the papacy of Pope Clement VIII as Bishop of Padua. On 21 December 1594, he was consecrated bishop by Agostino Valier, Bishop of Verona, with Francesco Cornaro (iuniore), Bishop of Treviso, and Antonio Grimani, Bishop of Torcello, serving as co-consecrators. He served as Bishop of Padua until his death on 11 June 1625.

== Episcopal succession ==
While bishop, he was the principal consecrator of:

- Ubertinus Papafava, Bishop of Adria;

and principal co-consecrator of:

- Andrea Sorbolonghi, Bishop of Gubbio (1600);
- Pomponio de Magistris, Bishop of Terracina, Priverno e Sezze (1608);
- Giambattista Leni, Bishop of Mileto (1608);
- Erasmo Paravicini, Bishop of Alessandria (1611);
- Giovanni Emo, Bishop of Bergamo (1611);
- Ludovico Sarego, Bishop of Adria (1612);
- Giovanni Battista de Aquena, Bishop of Bosa (1613);
- Ottaviano Garzadoro, Bishop of Ossero (1614);
- Giovanni Francesco Guidi di Bagno, Titular Archbishop of Patrae (1614);
- Scipione Pasquali, Bishop of Casale Monferrato (1615); and
- Giovanni dei Gualtieri, Bishop of Sansepolcro (1615).

== See also ==
- Catholic Church in Italy

Catholic Church titles
Preceded by Federico Cornaro	Bishop of Padua; 1594–1625	Succeeded by Pietro Valier
