= Costantino de Castro =

- Occupations: bishop of Bosa, in Sardinia, Italy

Costantino de Castro was a bishop of Bosa, in Sardinia, Italy.

In 1073, the Diocese of Bosa entered its golden age under Costantino, when Pope Gregory VII appointed him Metropolitan of Torres.

The Cathedral of St. Peter at Bosa was built while Costantino served as bishop there.
