= Alessandro Guidiccioni (seniore) =

Most Reverend Alessandro Guidiccioni
- Bishop of Lucca
- Church: Catholic Church
- Diocese: Diocese of Lucca
- In office: 1549–1600
- Predecessor: Bartolomeo Guidiccioni
- Successor: Alessandro Guidiccioni (iuniore)

Personal details
- Died: 1605 Lucca, Italy

Alessandro Guidiccioni (died 1605) was a Roman Catholic prelate who served as Bishop of Lucca (1549–1600).

== Biography ==
On 9 January 1549, Alessandro Guidiccioni was appointed during the papacy of Pope Paul III as Coadjutor Bishop of Lucca and succeeded to the bishopric on 4 November 1549. He served as Bishop of Lucca until his resignation in 1600. He died in 1605.

While bishop, he was the principal co-consecrator of Antonmaria Sauli, Titular Archbishop of Philadelphia in Arabia and Apostolic Nuncio to Naples (1586).

Catholic Church titles
Preceded by Bartolomeo Guidiccioni	Bishop of Lucca; 1549–1600	Succeeded by Alessandro Guidiccioni (iuniore)
