= Paulinus of Antioch =

Early Bishop of Lucca (d. 67)

Saint Paulinus of Antioch
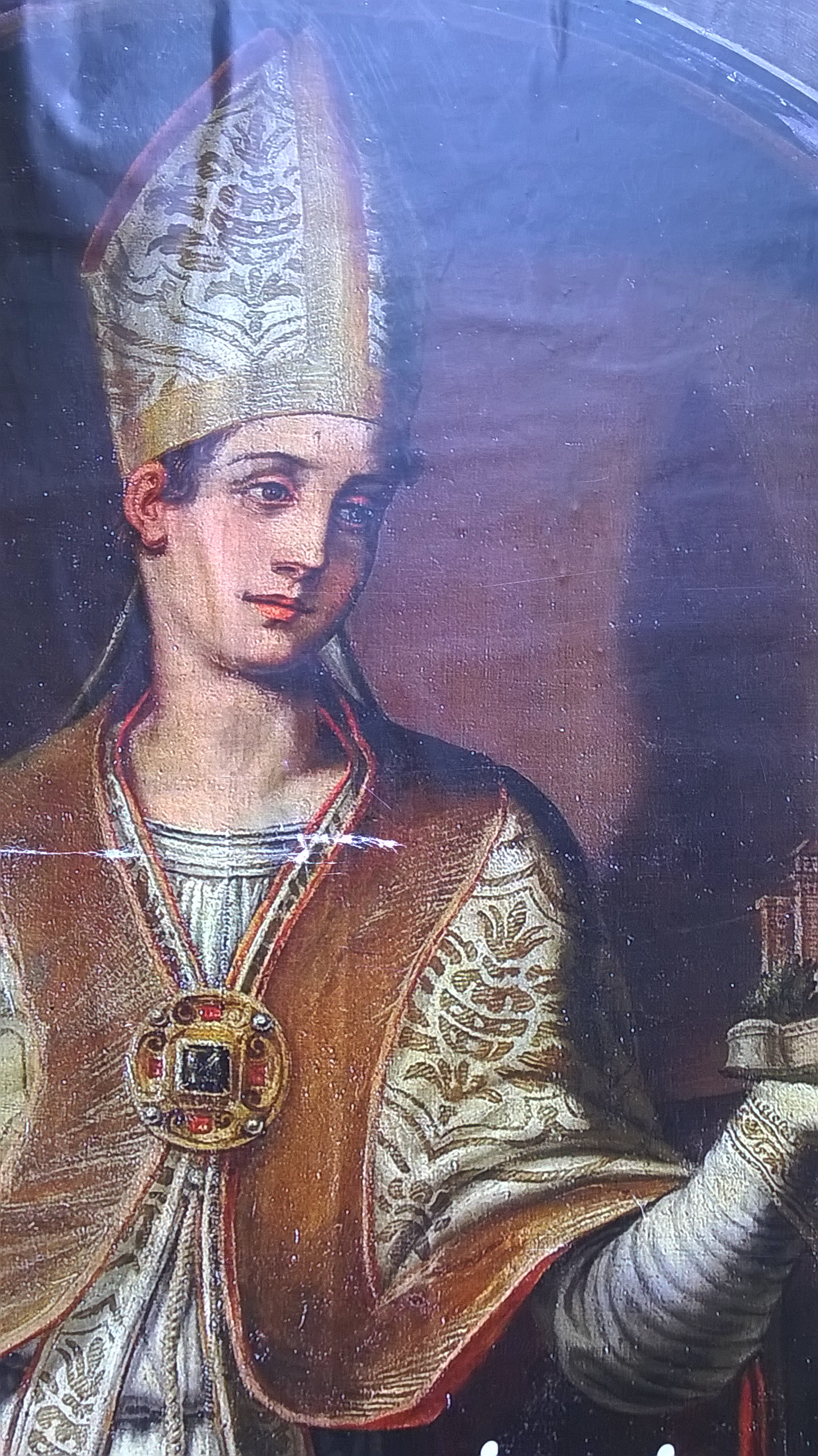

Bishop of Lucca and Hieromartyr
- Born: Antioch
- Died: 67
- Venerated in: Eastern Orthodox Church; Roman Catholic Church
- Feast: 12 July
- Patronage: Lucca, Italy

Paulinus was an early Christian saint, who, along with a priest, deacon and soldier—all of whose names were forgotten through time—suffered martyrdom in 67.

According to Holy Tradition, Paulinus was born in the city of Antioch. Paulinus is believed to have been converted and sent by Peter, whom he met at Antioch, to Lucca. He is believed to be the first Bishop of Lucca.

== Veneration ==
Paulinus is venerated as a saint in the Eastern Orthodox Church and Roman Catholic Church. His feast day is on 12 July.
