= Francisco Camps de la Carrera y Molés =

Most Reverend Francisco Camps de la Carrera y Molés
- Bishop of Bosa
- Church: Catholic Church
- Diocese: Diocese of Bosa
- In office: 1654–1656
- Predecessor: Gaspare Litago
- Successor: Giacomo Capay y Castagner

Orders
- Consecration: 11 July 1655 by Francesco Maria Brancaccio

Personal details
- Born: 1603 Solsona, Lleida, Spain
- Died: 10 January 1656 (age 53) Bosa, Italy

Francisco Camps de la Carrera y Molés (1603–1656) was a Roman Catholic prelate who served as Bishop of Bosa (1654–1656).

== Biography ==
Francisco Camps de la Carrera y Molés was born in Solsona, Lleida, Spain in 1603. On 12 January 1654, he was appointed during the papacy of Pope Innocent X as Bishop of Bosa. On 11 July 1655, he was consecrated bishop by Francesco Maria Brancaccio, Bishop of Viterbo e Tuscania. He served as Bishop of Bosa until his death on 10 January 1656.

Catholic Church titles
Preceded by Gaspare Litago	Bishop of Bosa; 1654–1656	Succeeded by Giacomo Capay y Castagner
