= Felino Maria Sandeo =

Italian canonist (1444–1503)

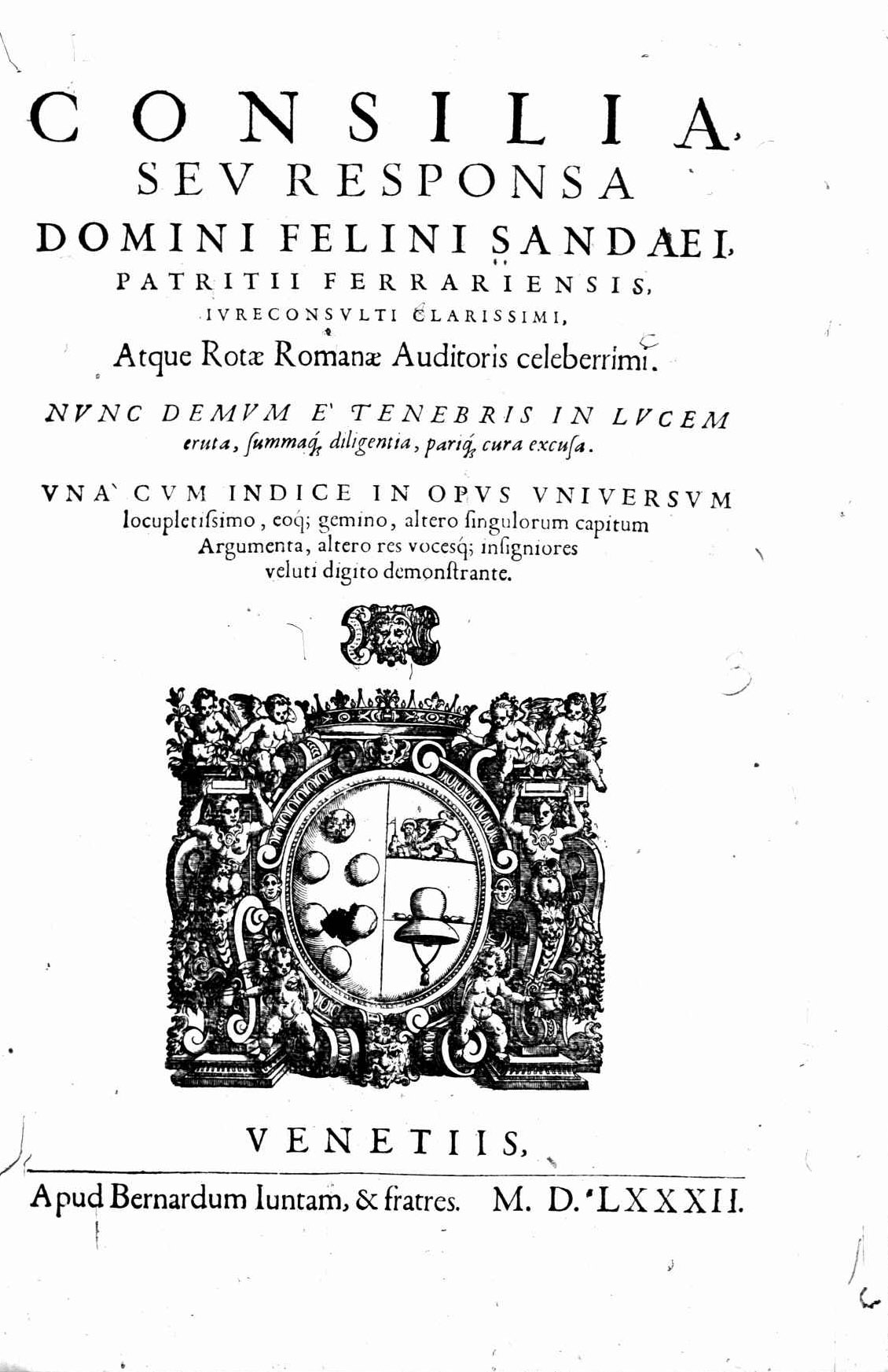
Consilia, 1582 – BEIC 13765305.jpg

Felino Maria Sandeo (1444–1503), often quoted under the Latin name of Felinus, was an Italian canonist of the fifteenth century.

== Biography ==
He was born at Felino, in the Diocese of Reggio, in 1444. He taught canon law from 1466 to 1474 at Ferrara, which was his family's native place, and at Pisa until 1484, when he became auditor of the Sacred Palace and lived at Rome. On 4 May 1495, he became Bishop of Penne and Atri and on 25 September of the same year Coadjutor Bishop of Lucca with right of succession. He became Bishop of Lucca in 1499.

He died at Lucca 1503, in October according to most writers, according to others at Rome on 6 September 1503.

== Writings ==
The 1913 Catholic Encyclopedia describes Felino as a good compiler who lacked originality.

His chief work is Lectura, or Commentaria in varios titulos libri I, II, IV, et V Decretalium (see Ludwig Hain, Repertor. bibliogr., II, n, 269–78, N. 14280–14325). Others include:

- Sermo de indulgentia
- Repetitiones
- Consilia
- Epitome de regno Siciliae (s. 1., 1495)

Some unedited works are mentioned in Fabricius, Bib. latina mediae et infimae aetatis with additions by Mansi, II (Florence, 1858), 558.

=== Editions ===
- Sandeo, Felino Maria (1582). Consilia (in Latin). Venezia: Bernardo Giunta & fratelli.
