= Diocese of Bosa =

Latin Catholic diocese in Sardinia, Italy (1612–1986)

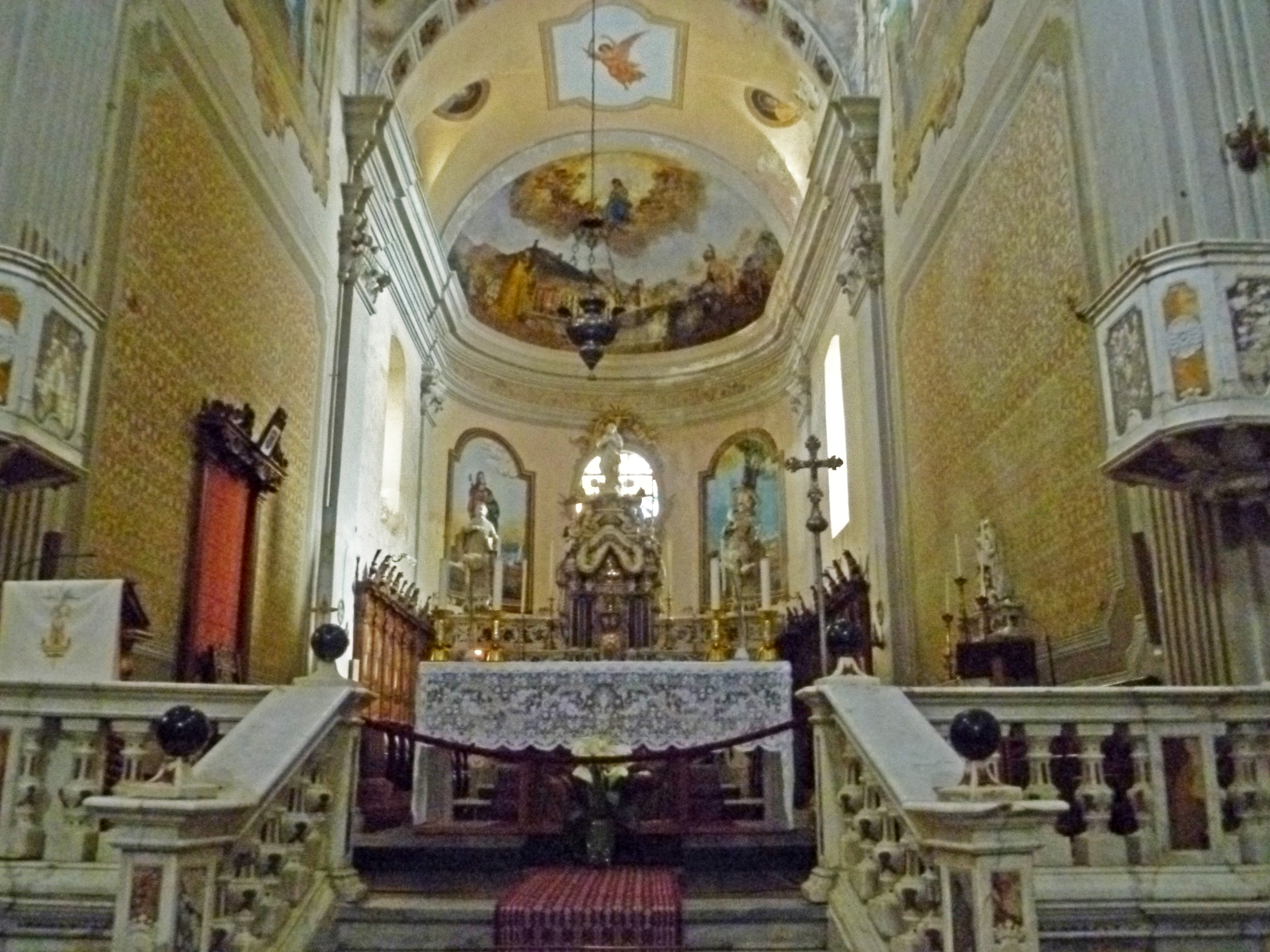
Co-cathedral of the Immaculate Conception, Bosa

The Diocese of Bosa was a Latin Church diocese of the Catholic Church in Sardinia. The town of Bosa is located on the western shore of the island, on the right (northern) bank of the Temo River, at its mouth. The diocese was established by 1073, and was a suffragan of the archdiocese of Torres (Sassari). It was merged into the diocese of Alghero-Bosa in 1986.

== History ==
=== Claims of early establishment ===
It is asserted by some that the see was originally at Calmedia, but was transferred to Bosa after the destruction of the former town; also, that the first bishop was Emilius, sent thither by Peter and martyred in 70 AD; but there is no historical evidence for either claim.

Pope Gregory the Great, in a letter of July 599, addresses six bishops of Sardinia, without mentioning the bishops' dioceses, who are neglectful of their metropolitan, the bishop of Cagliari. The identification of any of the dioceses as Bosa is pure inference, and the assignment of any of the six names to Bosa is conjecture. In 1073 Costantino de Castro, Bishop of Bosa, who according to an inscription had built Bosa Cathedral, dedicated to Saint Peter, was appointed Metropolitan of Torres by Gregory VII.

The cathedral of Bosa was later Santa Maria ad Nives. The cathedral was administered and served by a corporation called the Chapter, consisting of one dignity, the Archpriest, thirteen canons, and the Penitentiary.

The bishop of Bosa was also styled Abbot of S. Maria di Corte, Abbot of S. Maria di Coros, and Prior of the Church of S. Antonio Abate. Among the notable bishops of this diocese are numbered the learned Cardinal Juan Casanova (1424); Giovanni Francesco Fara (1591), author of the first (but frequently inaccurate) history of Sardinia; and Serafino Esquirro, a theologian, who had been General of the Servites (1677).

The Jesuits founded a college (high school) in Bosa in 1691. They were expelled from Sardinia in 1773, and again in 1848.

=== Synods ===
A diocesan synod was an irregularly held, but important, meeting of the bishop of a diocese and his clergy. Its purpose was (1) to proclaim generally the various decrees already issued by the bishop; (2) to discuss and ratify measures on which the bishop chose to consult with his clergy; (3) to publish statutes and decrees of the diocesan synod, of the provincial synod, and of the Holy See.

Bishop Giovanni Francesco Fara held a diocesan synod on 10–12 June 1591. Bishop Gavino Castagna (1663–1671) presided over a diocesan synod in Bosa from 3–5 February 1665. In 1780, Bishop Giovanni Battista Quasina (1768–1785) presided over a diocesan synod. A diocesan synod was held by Bishop Nicola Cani, O.P. (1727–1737) in his cathedral on 10 January 1729.

On 9 September 1919, the collegiate church of Santa Maria ad Nives in the town of Cuglieri (22km,14mi south of Bosa) was granted the title and privileges of a "minor basilica" by Pope Benedict XV.

=== Bosa and Alghero united ===
On 16 January 1906, Giovanni Battista Vinati was appointed bishop of Bosa; on the same day, he was named Apostolic Administrator of Alghero. He held the administratorship for sixteen months.

Bishop Francesco Spanedda had been named bishop of Bosa in 1956, to which was added the bishopric of Alghero in 1972; when he was named archbishop of Oristano in 1979, he was bishop of Alghero and Bosa. two months later, his successor to both dioceses was named, Giovanni Pes. The two dioceses were being held by one bishop, aeque principaliter. That policy became problematical, however, as Italian corporation law on "juridical personality" changed. In a formal revision of the concordat between the Italian State and the Holy See, it was agreed that the canonical device of "aeque personaliter" would be ended.

On 30 September 1986, with the consent of Pope John Paul II, the Congregation of Bishops issued a decree, suppressing the diocese of Bosa and uniting it to Alghero. The name of the diocese would be Algarensis-Bosanensis. The seat of the new diocese and its cathedral would be in Alghero; the cathedral in Bosa would become a "co-cathedral". The territory of the diocese would be the territory of both dioceses. Bishop Giovanni Pes would be the bishop, and was made responsible for implemting the decree.

== Bishops of Bosa ==
Latin name: Bosanensis
Metropolitan: Archdiocese of Sassari

=== To 1450 ===
...

- Constantinus de Crasta ( ? –1073)
- Marinus ( ? –1116?)
- Joannes (1138)

...

- Goffredo (1170)
- D(...) (c. 1176–1186)

...

- Tommaso (c. 1259–1262)
- Mazuclus (attested 1263)
- Giacomo (1268)
- Petrus ( ? )
- Nicolaus de Vare (1304―1312)
- Stanagio (1319― ? )
- Joannes de Clavaro, O.Carm. (1327―1340)
- Raimundus de Gauzens (1344? –1349)
- Petrus, O.S.B. (1349–1350)
- Aimericus (1351–1356)
- Andreas, O.Carm. (1356–1360)
- Rogerius Piazza, O.Min. (1360–1363)
- Rainerius de Filippono (1363–1391)
- Antonius (1391–1402)
- Antonius de Ligios (1402–1406)
- Benedictus (1406–1407)
- Antonius (or Angelo) Sangualo (1407–1412)
- Antonius de Podio, O.Min. (1410–1418) Avignon-Peñiscola Obedience
- Antonius Stamingus, O.Min. (1413–1418)
- Ludovicus Gervas, O.P. (1418–1423)
- Juan Casanova, O.P. (1424–1425)
- Giuliano de Tallada, O.P. (1435–1445)
- Thomas de Rubio, O.P. (1445–1449)
- Francesco Meloni (1449–1450)

=== From 1450 to 1700 ===
- Giovanni Cosso, O.P. (1450–1459)
- Bernardo Roig (1460–1471?)
- Giovanni de Salinis, O.Min. (1471–1484)
- Galcerando Galba (1484–1493?)
- Pietro di Sorra (1495–1515?)
- Giovanni di Sorra (1516–)
- Bernardo Gentile, O.P. (1532–1537)
- Nicolás de Aragón (1537–1541)
- Baltasar de Heredia, O.P. (1541–1548)
- Vincenzo de Leone, O.Carm. (1548–1556)
- Antonio Pintor Cavaro (1556–1572)
- Giovanni Melis (1572–1575)
- Juan Serra, O.E.S.A. (1575–1576)
- Nicola Canyelles (1577–1586 Died)
- José Anglés, O.F.M.Observ. (1586)
- Jerónimo Garcia, O.S.Trinit. (1588–1590?)
- Giovanni Francesco Fara (1591)
- Antonio Atzori (1592–1604)
- Gavino Manca de Cedrelles (1605–1612)
- Juan Alvarez Zapata, O.Cist. (1612–1613)
- Giovanni Battista de Aquena (1613–1615)
- Vincenzo Bacallar (1615–1625)
- Giovanni Atzori (1625–1627 Died)
- Sebastiano Carta (1627–1631 Died)
- Melchiorre Pirella (1631–1635 Appointed, Bishop of Ales e Terralba)
- Giovanni Maria Olmo (1635–1639 Died)
- Vicente Agustín Clavería (1639–1644 Appointed, Bishop of Alghero)
- Gaspare Litago (1645–1652)
- Francisco Camps de la Carrera y Molés (1654–1657 Died)
- Giacomo Capay y Castagner (1658–1663 Died)
- Gavino Cattayna (Castagna) (1663–1671)
- Francisco López de Urraca, O.E.S.A. (1672–1677
- Serafino Esquirro (1677–1680)
- Giorgio Sotgia (Soggia), O.S.M. (1682–1701)

=== From 1700 to 1986 ===
- Gavino di Aquena (1702–1723)
- Nicola Cani, O.P. (1727–1737)
- Giovanni Leonardo Sanna (1737–1741)
- Francesco Bernardo de Cespedes (1742–1746)
- Antonio Amat (1746–1748)
- Giovanni Battista Machín Espiga (1748–1749)
- Raimondo Quesada (1750–1758)
- Giuseppe Stanislao Concas (1759–1763)
- Giovanni Antonio Borro (1763–1767 Died)
- Giovanni Battista Quasina (1768–1785)
- Giovanni Antonio Cossu, O.S.M. (1785–1796)
- Gavino Murro (1800–1819)
- Francesco Maria Tola (1823–1843)
- Antonio Uda (1845–1845)

Sede vacante (1846–1871)

- Eugenio Cano (1871–1905 Resigned)
- Giovanni Battista Vinati (1906–1916 Resigned)
- Angelico Antonio Zannetti (1916–1926)
- Filippo Mantini (1926–1931)
- Nicolò Frazioli (1931–1956)
- Francesco Spanedda (1956–1979)
- Giovanni Pes (1979–1986)

30 September 1986: United with the Diocese of Alghero to form the Diocese of Alghero-Bosa

== Bibliography ==
=== Reference Works ===
- Eubel, Conradus, ed. (1913). Hierarchia catholica (in Latin). Vol. 1 (Tomus 1) (second ed.). Münster: Libreria Regensbergiana. p. 141.. Archived.
- Eubel, Conradus, ed. (1914). Hierarchia catholica (in Latin). Vol. 2 (Tomus 2) (second ed.). Münster: Libreria Regensbergiana. p. 109.. Archived.
- Eubel, Conradus, ed. (1923). Hierarchia catholica (in Latin). Vol. 3 (Tomus 3) (second ed.). Münster: Libreria Regensbergiana. p. 137.. Archived.
- Gams, Pius Bonifatius (1873). Series episcoporum Ecclesiae catholicae: quotquot innotuerunt a beato Petro apostolo. Ratisbon: Typis et Sumptibus Georgii Josephi Manz. pp. 834-835. (Use with caution; obsolete)
- Gauchat, Patritius (Patrice) (1935). Hierarchia catholica (in Latin). Vol. IV (1592-1667). Münster: Libraria Regensbergiana.
- Ritzler, Remigius; Sefrin, Pirminus (1952). Hierarchia catholica medii et recentis aevi (in Latin). Vol. V (1667-1730). Patavii: Messagero di S. Antonio.
- Ritzler, Remigius; Sefrin, Pirminus (1958). Hierarchia catholica medii et recentis aevi (in Latin). Vol. 6 (1730-1799). Patavii: Messagero di S. Antonio.
- Ritzler, Remigius; Sefrin, Pirminus (1968). Hierarchia Catholica medii et recentioris aevi (in Latin). Vol. 7 (1800–1846). Monasterii: Libr. Regensburgiana.
- Ritzler, Remigius; Sefrin, Pirminus (1978). Hierarchia catholica Medii et recentioris aevi (in Latin). Vol. 8 (1846–1903). Il Messaggero di S. Antonio.
- Pięta, Zenon (2002). Hierarchia catholica medii et recentioris aevi (in Latin). Vol. 9 (1903–1922). Padua: Messagero di San Antonio. ISBN 978-88-250-1000-8.

=== Studies ===
- Cappelletti, Giuseppe (1857). Le chiese d'Italia dalla loro origine sino ai nostri giorni (in Italian). Vol. decimoterzo (13). Venezia: Antonelli. pp. 209–224..
- Martini, Pietro (1841). Storia ecclesiastica di Sardegna. Volume 3 Cagliari: Stamperia Reale, 1841. (pp. 340)-346; 398, 583.
- Mattei, Antonio Felice (1758). Sardinia sacra seu De episcopis Sardis historia nunc primò confecta a F. Antonio Felice Matthaejo. (in Latin). Romae: ex typographia Joannis Zempel apud Montem Jordanum, 1758. Pp. 193-206.
- Pintus, Sebastiano (1907). "Diocesi di Bosa: Notizie storiche," (in Italian), in: Archivio storico Sardo Vol. 3 (Cagliari-Sassari: G. Montorsi 1907), pp. 55-71.

=== External links ===
- Gabriel Chow, GCatholic.org,"GCatholic.org"; retrieved: 19 November 2025.
