= Archdiocese of Lucca =

Latin Catholic ecclesiastical jurisdiction in Italy

Coordinates: 43.8500°N 10.5167°E

Archdiocese of Lucca Archidioecesis Lucensis Arcidiocesi di Lucca

Catholic
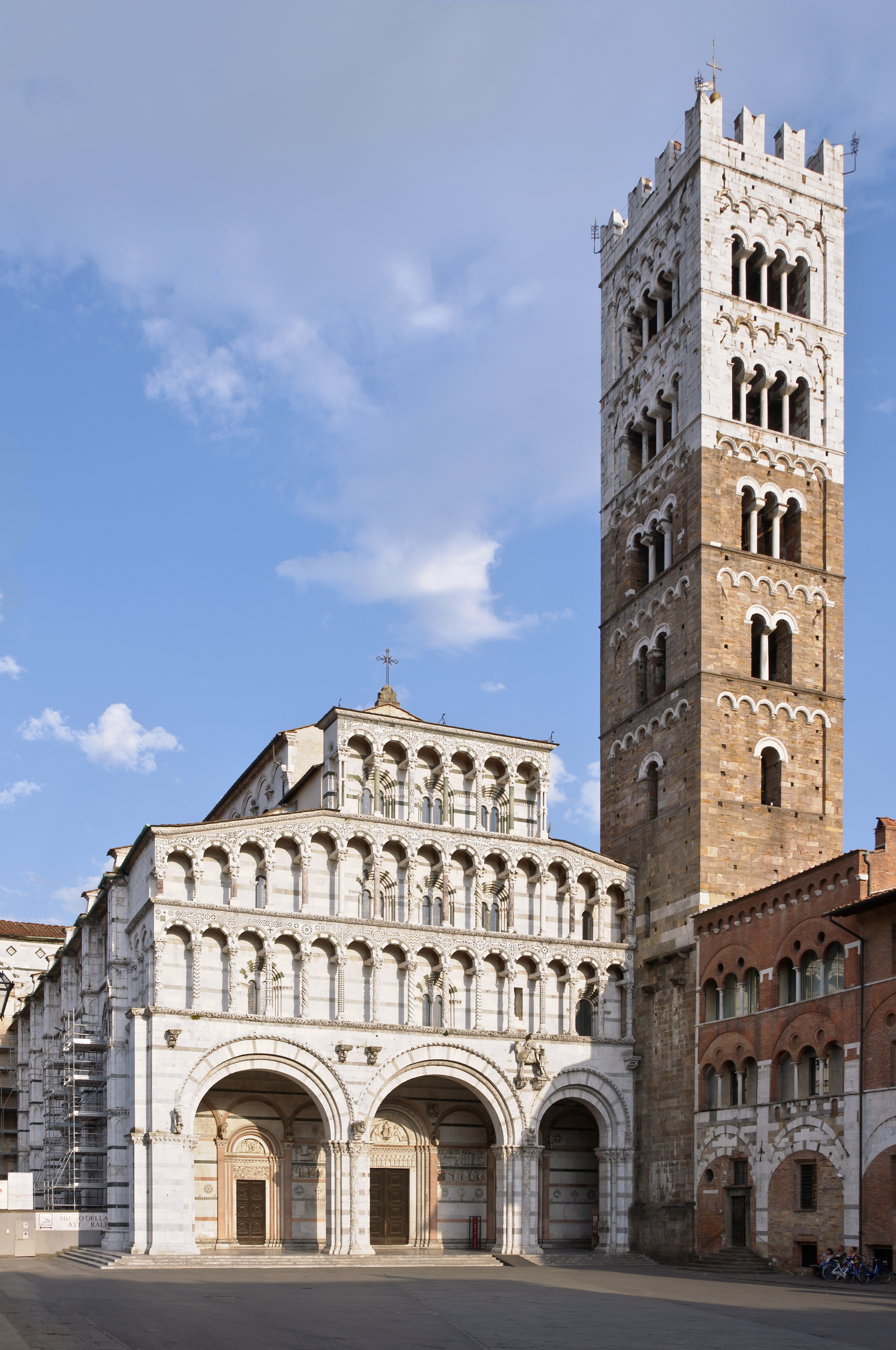
- Lucca Cathedral

Location
- Country: Italy
- Ecclesiastical province: Immediately subject to the Holy See

Statistics
- Area: 1,520 km^{2} (590 sq mi)
- Population: Total; Catholics: (as of 2021); 318,390 (est.); 311,455
- Parishes: 362

Information
- Denomination: Catholic Church
- Sui iuris church: Latin Church
- Rite: Roman Rite
- Established: by 4th century
- Cathedral: Cathedral of St Martin in Lucca
- Patron saint: St Paulinus of Antioch
- Secular priests: 178 (diocesan); 15 (Religious Orders); 21 Permanent Deacons

Current leadership
- Pope: Leo XIV
- Archbishop: Paolo Giulietti
- Bishops emeritus: Benvenuto Castellani

Map

Website
- Website of the Archdiocese

The Archdiocese of Lucca (Latin: Archidioecesis Lucensis) is a Latin Church ecclesiastical territory or diocese of the Catholic Church in Italy. The diocese dates back as a diocese to at least the 4th century; it became an archdiocese in 1726. The seat of the archbishop is in Lucca, in the cathedral of S. Martino. It is not a metropolitan see, has no suffragan dioceses, and is an exempt diocese, that is immediately subject (exempt) to the Holy See (Papacy).

== History ==
During the Gothic Wars the city of Lucca was besieged and taken by Totila in 550. Hoping for assistance from the Franks, the Lucchesi obstinately resisted the attack of Narses, surrendering only after a siege of seven months (553). It later fell into the hands of the Lombards, was thenceforward a place of great importance, and became the favourite seat of the Marquesses of Tuscany.

In 981 Otto II, Holy Roman Emperor bestowed on its bishop civil jurisdiction over the entire diocesan territory; but in 1081 Emperor Henry IV made it a free city and conferred other favours upon it, especially in the way of trade. This was the origin of the Republic of Lucca. Lucca was generally on the side of the pope against the emperor, and hence joined the League of S. Ginesio (1197).

=== Mythical history ===
There is a legend that the Gospel was preached at Lucca by a certain St. Paulinus, said to be a disciple of St. Peter, and the discovery in 1197 of a stone, recording the deposition of the relics of Paulinus, a holy martyr, apparently confirmed this belief. On the stone, however, St. Paulinus is not called Bishop of Lucca, nor is there any allusion to his having lived in Apostolic times. His hagiography belongs to the 13th century. His existence is unknown to all documents and monuments down to the end of the 12th century, and no church or chapel in the diocese was dedicated to him. At the Council of Rimini (359), another Paulinus, Bishop of Lucca, was said to be present. Perhaps the legend of Paulinus, the follower of S. Peter, arose through a repetition of this Paulinus. But no records of a council of Rimini in 359 survive. The claim of a second Paulinus or of his presence at Rimini cannot be tested.

=== Earliest bishops ===
The first bishop of certain date is Maximus, present at the Council of Sardica (343). Remarkable for sanctity and miracles was St. Fridianus (Frediano) (560–588), son of Ultonius, King of Ireland, or perhaps of a king of Ulster (Ultonia), of whom in his "Dialogues" (III, 10) Gregory the Great relates a miracle.

In 739, during the episcopate of Walprandus, the legendary Richard, King of the Angles and father of the Saints Willibald, Winnibald, and Walburga, died at Lucca and was buried in the church of S. Frediano. Under Bishop Giovanni (c. 781–800) it is said that the Volto Santo was brought to Lucca from Palestine; carbon dating puts the work c. 780–880.

=== Chapter and cathedrals ===
The original cathedral of the diocese of Lucca was the church of S. Reparata. At the beginning of the 8th century, the seat of the bishop was transferred to S. Martino, and S. Reparata became a collegiate church staffed by canons. On 6 October 1070, Pope Alexander II and 22 bishops and abbots consecrated the new cathedral of S. Martin in Lucca. The cathedral was run by a cathedral chapter.

On 7 May 1120, Pope Calixtus II granted the use of the pallium to Bishop Benedictus (1118–1128) and his successors. Pope Lucius III granted the bishops the right to have the primatial cross carried before them in procession in their own diocese on 12 November 1181.

=== Suppression of the diocese of Lucca ===
Garfagna was a river valley and a group of communes located north-northeast of the city of Lucca. Ecclesiastically, it was subject to the bishops of Lucca, but its civil administration was part of the Holy Roman Empire and subject to the Holy Roman Emperor Frederick II, who administered it through an imperial vicar. In 1222, constant hostility between Lucca and Pisa broke out into open warfare. In 1228, Pope Gregory IX intervened in 1228, and ordered the parties to make peace.

The nobles and barons of Garfagnana, taking an opportunity to free themselves from Lucca, swore oaths of allegiance to Pope Gregory IX on 23 November 1228. Pope Gregory appointed a papal vicar to administer the territory, in place of the imperial vicar. In 1229, Gregory wrote to Bishop Opizzo of Lucca, warning him not to molest the people of the Garfagnana. When war broke out between Lucca and Pisa in 1230, not for the first time, the people of Garfagnana took advantage of the war, to rise in revolt to free themselves from the Lucchese. The Lucchese, despite the support of Pope Gregory for Pisa and his intervention in the Garfagnana, were not minded to allow the revolt of Garfagnana to go unpunished. Their principal attack was on the castle and town of Loppia, the capital of the imperial territory, which they destroyed.

On 8 April 1231, Pope Gregory IX wrote a letter to the people, prelates, and clergy of Lucca, announcing that, due to the enormous crimes (propter enormes civium Lucanorum culpas) of the citizens, he had decided to remove the bishop of Lucca and suppress the diocese. He appointed the bishop of Florence, then the archbishop of Pisa, then again the bishop of Florence, to be the representative of the pope in exerecising episcopal jurisdiction in the city and diocese of Lucca. The diocese was restored, and a new bishop, Guercio Tebalducci, was appointed, by Gregory IX on 12 December 1236.

Gregory died on 22 August 1241. The Garfagnana was back under the control of Frederick II and the comune of Lucca by December 1242.

=== Early diocesan synods ===
A diocesan synod was an irregularly held, but important, meeting of the bishop of a diocese and his clergy. Its purpose was (1) to proclaim generally the various decrees already issued by the bishop; (2) to discuss and ratify measures on which the bishop chose to consult with his clergy; (3) to publish statutes and decrees of the diocesan synod and of the Holy See.

On 12 March 1253, Bishop Guercio (1236–1255) presided over a diocesan synod in the cathedral of S. Martino in Lucca. Bishop Henricus (1300–1330) held a diocesan synod in 1300. A diocesan synod was held by Bishop Berengarius (1349–1368) in the episcopal palace in Lucca on 14 October 1351. He held a second synod on 20 October 1366, in the cathedral. Bishop Paolo Gabrielli (1374–1380) held a diocesan synod on 13 November 1374. Bishop Nicolò Guinigi (1394-1404; 1432–1435) held two diocesan synods, one on 12 August 1404, and another on 16 September 1414.

=== Schism ===
Pope Gregory XII (Roman Obedience) fled from Rome and the power of Paolo Orsini on 9 August 1407. He travelled to Viterbo, to prepare for a congress which was to be held in Savona. In September, he and the papal court moved to Siena, where he held meetings with representatives of the French and of Pope Benedict XIII.

In 1408 Pope Gregory went to Lucca from Siena, to attempt to arrange a meeting with Pope Benedict XIII (Avignon Obedience), to settle the schism. On 9 May 1408, while still in Lucca, Pope Gregory created fourn new cardinals, two of whom were his nephews. This was in apparent violation of the electoral capitulations signed and sworn to at his election in 1406. Eight of his cardinals removed themselves from Lucca in anger and fear, beginning on 11 May, and made for Pisa. The cardinals held a formal meeting at Livorno on 29 June, denouncing Gregory XII and calling for a church council. In fear of the French fleet, which held the city of Genoa, Gregory abandoned the announced plan to meet in Savona, and returned to Siena on 14 July 1408. At the Council of Pisa on 5 June 1409, Gregory and Benedict were deposed.

==== Territorial losses ====
In 1519, the parish church of S. Maria Maggiore in Pescia was created a Provostship, and its Provost was assigned 60 parishes of the diocese of Lucca as his ordinary jurisdiction, nullius dioecesis, independent of the bishop of Lucca and immediately subject to the Holy See (Papacy). On 17 March 1727, Pope Benedict XIII made Pescia the seat of a diocese, separating its territory entirely from the diocese of Lucca, and appointed the first bishop. Bartolomeo Pucci, the Bishop of San Sepolcro, was transferred to the diocese of Pescia on 20 September 1728.

=== Post-Tridentine synods ===
Bishop Alessandro Guidiccioni the Elder (1549–1600) held a diocesan synod in the cathedral of S. Martino in Lucca on 12 November 1564, following the decrees laid down by the Council of Trent, which had adjourned in the previous year. In his Summons, the bishop laid out in detail the precise expectations of a synod. His second synod was held on 4 March 1574, in which the establishment of a diocesan seminary was approved. On 15 September 1579, Bishop Guidiccioni held another synod, in the main hall of the episcopal palace. BIshop Alessandro Guidiccioni the Younger (1600–1637) held a diocesan synod on 25–27 November 1625. In 1646, Bishop Giovanni Battista Rainoldi (1645–1650) held a diocesan synod. On 10 April 1653, Bishop Pietro Rota (1650–1657) presided over a diocesan synod. Cardinal Girolamo Buonvisi (1657–1677) held a diocesan synod on 30 May–1 June 1661. On 16–18 April 1681, Cardinal Giulio Spinola (1677–1690 resigned) presided over a diocesan synod. Cardinal Francesco Buonvisi (1690–1704) held a diocesan synod in the cathedral of S. Martino on 28–30 April 1700.

At the beginning of August 1719, Bishop Genesio Calchi (1714–1723) sent out the usual summonses, announcing that there would be a general diocesan synod in Lucca, to open on 18 September 1719. This raised an immediate outcry on the part of the clergy of the Garfagnana, who were required to attend, as part of the ecclesiastical territory of the diocese of Lucca, even though they were part of the political territory then under the control of the Duke of Mantua. Complaints to the duke led to a complaint on the part of the duke to the pope, requesting that the synod not be held. Pope Clement XI wrote to the bishop of Lucca on 10 September 1719, pointing out the complex difficulties, and requesting the bishop to find a way to cancel, or at least postpone, the synod. On the 14th, the bishop wrote to the Council of State of Lucca, asking that they see that there was calm so that his synod could be held, but the Council sided with the pope in requesting the bishop to suspend the holding of the synod.

Bishop Fabio Colloredo (1731–1742) held a synod on 15–17 May 1736.

==== Territorial losses ====
On 5 December 1622, Pope Gregory XV established the diocese of San Miniato on territory which had formed part of the diocese of Lucca.

=== Interdict ===
In the 1640s, the Republic of Lucca was a subject of great annoyance to the Papacy. Lucca allowed German protestants to reside in the city, spreading heresy; it violated legitimate exemptions of the clergy from laws and regulations; and it considered it its right to tax commercial transactions in goods, particularly grain. Bishop Guidiccioni in his advanced age was not able to make progress in enforcing the church's demands. On his death, Cardinal Marco Antonio Franciotti was appointed bishop, in the expectation that a native of Lucca would succeed in restraining the government. He failed. On 1 September 1639, therefore, Pope Urban VIII ordered Franciotti to leave the city, and he appointed an Apostolic Commissary to deal with the Republic, Bishop Cesare Raccagni of Città di Castello, who also failed. The dreaded interdict was pronounced by the pope on 2 April 1640. The clergy obeyed the pope, but the Republic trusted to the support of the Grand Duke of Tuscany and the King of Spain. Only after protracted negotiations was the interdict lifted, on 31 March 1643. Cardinal Franciotti was appointed papal legate in the March of Ancona (May 1640 to December 1642). At the conclusion of his term, he moved to Rome, where he provided shelter for his brothers, who had been driven out of Lucca.

On 11 September 1726, by the bull "Inscrutabili divinae", Pope Benedict XIII raised the diocese of Lucca to the status of a metropolitan archdiocese.

==== Territorial losses ====
On 18 July 1789, at the request of the government of Florence, Pope Pius VI transferred 18 parishes from the diocese of Lucca to the diocese of Pisa, including the Vicariates of Barga and of Pietrasanta, and transferred 7 parishes from the diocese of Pisa to the diocese of Lucca. In April 1826, Pope Leo XII, basing his decision on a bull of Pope Pius VII of 3 July 1822, removed the Priorato of Castelnuovo in the valley of the Garfagnana, which included 40 parishes, from the diocese of Lucca, as well as several churches in the Vicariate of Castiglione.

==== Territorial gains ====
In the changes following the Second Vatican Council, the Holy See again revisited the centuries-old problem of the Garfagnana. After extensive consultations, and by the authority granted by Pope John Paul II, the Roman Congregation of Bishops issued the decree "Pastoralis Collocatio", on 5 September 1992, transferring 106 parishes of the Garfagnana from the diocese of Massa (Massensis-Apuana) to the diocese of Lucca. The Massa-Cararra diocese had been created in 1822.

== Bishops of Lucca ==
=== To 1100 ===
...

- Maximus (attested 342 or 343)

...

- Fredianus (c. 560–588)

...

- Laetus (attested 649)

...

- Eleutherius (attested 679)
- Felix (attested 685/686)
- Balsarius (attested 700)
- Talesperianus (attested 713–729)
- Walprandus (attested 737–754)
- Peredeus (attested 755–779)
- Joannes (attested 781–800)
- Jacobus (attested 801-818)
- Petrus (attested 819-834)
- Berengarius (attested 837-843)
- Ambrosius (attested 843-852)
- Hieronymus (Aldobrandeschi) (attested 852-867)
- Gherardus (attested 869-895)
- Petrus (attested 896–932)
- Conradus (attested 935–964)
- Aghinus (attested 967)
- Adalongus (attested 968–978)
- Wido (attested 979–981)
- Teudigrimus (attested 983–987)
- Isalfredus (attested 988–989)
- Gherardus (attested 990–1003)
- Rodilandus (attested 1005)
- Grimithus (attested 1014–1022)
- Joannes (attested 1023–1055)
- Anselmo Badagio (1056–1073)
- Anselm of Lucca (1073–1086)

Petrus (1081–1092) adherent of Emperor Henry IV

- Gotifredus (attested 1089 ?)

=== 1100 to 1435 ===
- Rangerius (attested c. 1096–1112)
- Rodulfus (1112–1118)
- Benedictus (attested 1119–1127)
- Ubertus (attested 1128-1135 deposed)
- Guido (attested 1138)
- Otto (attested 1139-1146)
- Gregorius (attested 1147-1163)

...

- Willelmus (attested 1170-1194)
- Guido (attested 18 May 1194 - 9 May 1202)
- Robertus attested 31 August 1202 - 21 September 1225)
- Riccardus (September 1225 - c. 1225) Bishop-elect
- Opizzo (1227–1231)

Sede remoto (1231–1236)

- Guercio Tebalducci (1236–1255)
- Henricus
- Paganellus
- Petrus Angelello (1272–1274)
- Paganellus de Porcari (1274–1300)
- Henricus (1300–1330)
- Guillermus Dulcini, O.P. (1330–1349)
- Berengarius (1349–1368)
- Guilelmus de Lordato (1368−1373)
- Paulus de Gabriellibus (1374–1380)
- Antonius de Riparia (1381–1383)
- Giovanni Salviati de Ficeccio, O.Min. (1383–1393) Roman Obedience
- Nicolò Guinigi (1394-1404; 1432–1435) Roman Obedience

Loto (1404–1423) Avignon Obedience?
Frederico (1423–1432) Avignon Obedience?

=== 1435 to 1726 ===
- Ludovicus de Maulinis (1435-1440)
- Baldassare de Mannis (1441–1448)
- Stephanus de Trenti (1448–1477)
- Cardinal Jacopo Ammanati (1477–1479) in commendam
- Nicolaus Sandonnino (1479–1499)
- Felino Maria Sandeo (1499–1503)
- Galeotto Franciotti della Rovere (1503–1507)
- Sisto Gara della Rovere (1507–1517) Administrator
- Leonardo Grosso della Rovere (briefly in March 1517)
- Raffaele Sansoni Riario (March– November 1517) Administrator
- Francesco Sforza Riario (1517–1546)
- Bartolomeo Guicciodoni (1546–1549)
- Alessandro Guidiccioni
- Alessandro Guidiccioni (1600–1637)
- Cardinal Marco Antonio Franciotti (1637–1645)
- Giovanni Battista Rainoldi (1645–1650)
- Pietro Rota (1650–1657)
- Cardinal Girolamo Buonvisi (1657–1677)
- Cardinal Giulio Spinola (1677–1690 resigned)
- Cardinal Francesco Buonvisi (1690–1700)
- Orazio Spada (1704–1714)
- Genesio Calchi (1714–1723)
- Bernardino Guinigi (1723–1726) promoted to archbishop

== Archbishops of Lucca ==
- Bernardino Guinigi (1723–1729)
- Tommaso Cervioni (1729–1731)
- Fabio Colloredo, Orat. (1731–1742)
- Giuseppe Palma (1743–1764)
- Gian Domenico Mansi (1764–1769)
- Martino Bianchi (1770–1789)
- Filippo Sardi (1789-1826)
- Giuseppe de Nobili (1826-1836)
- Giovanni Domenico Stefanelli, O.P. (1836-1844 Resigned)
- Pietro Luigi Pera (1845-1846)

Sede vacante (1846–1849)

- Giulio Arrigoni, O.F.M. Ref. (1849-1875)
- Nicola Ghilardi (1875-1904)
- Benedetto Lorenzelli (1904-1910)
- Arturo Marchi (1910–1928)
- Antonio Torrini (1928–1973)
- Enrico Bartoletti (1973)
- Giuliano Agresti (1973–1990)
- Bruno Tommasi (1991–2005)
- Benvenuto Italo Castellani (2005–2019)
- Paolo Giulietti (2019– )

== Parishes ==
A document survives dated 1260, giving a complete list of the parishes and churches in the diocese of Lucca, with their annual incomes. A list of the parishes and churches in 1736 is given in the appendix of the Synodus Lucana of that year. The archdiocese, as of 2008, has a total of 362 parishes, all of which fall within the (civil) region of Tuscany. 354 are in the Province of Lucca and 8 in the Province of Pistoia. For a listing of parishes by province and commune see List of parishes of the Roman Catholic Archdiocese of Lucca.

== See also ==
- Timeline of Lucca

== Bibliography ==
=== Reference works for bishops ===
- Gams, Pius Bonifatius (1873). Series episcoporum Ecclesiae catholicae: quotquot innotuerunt a beato Petro apostolo (in Latin). Ratisbon: Typis et Sumptibus Georgii Josephi Manz. pp. 739-741.
- Eubel, Conradus, ed. (1913). Hierarchia catholica (in Latin). Vol. 1 (Tomus I) (second ed.). Münster: Libreria Regensbergiana. (in Latin)
- Eubel, Conradus, ed. (1914). Hierarchia catholica (in Latin). Vol. 2 (Tomus II) (second ed.). Münster: Libreria Regensbergiana.
- Eubel, Conradus; Gulik, Guilelmus, eds. (1923). Hierarchia catholica (in Latin). Vol. 3 (Tomus III) (second ed.). Münster: Libreria Regensbergiana.
- Gauchat, Patritius (Patrice) (1935). Hierarchia catholica. Vol. 4 (Tomus IV) (1592–1667). Münster: Libraria Regensbergiana.
- Ritzler, Remigius; Sefrin, Pirminus (1952). Hierarchia catholica medii et recentis aevi. Vol. 5 (Tomus V) (1667–1730). Patavii: Messagero di S. Antonio.
- Ritzler, Remigius; Sefrin, Pirminus (1958). Hierarchia catholica medii et recentis aevi. Vol. 6 (Tomus VI) (1730–1799). Patavii: Messagero di S. Antonio.
- Ritzler, Remigius; Sefrin, Pirminus (1968). Hierarchia Catholica medii et recentioris aevi (in Latin). Vol. VII (1800–1846). Monasterii: Libreria Regensburgiana.
- Remigius Ritzler; Pirminus Sefrin (1978). Hierarchia catholica Medii et recentioris aevi (in Latin). Vol. VIII (1846–1903). Il Messaggero di S. Antonio.
- Pięta, Zenon (2002). Hierarchia catholica medii et recentioris aevi (in Latin). Vol. IX (1903–1922). Padua: Messagero di San Antonio. ISBN 978-88-250-1000-8.

=== Studies ===
- Bertini, Domenico. Memorie e documenti per servire alla storia di Lucca, (in Italian and Latin), Volume 4. Lucca: Presso Francesco Bertini, 1818.
- Bertini, Domenico. Memorie e documenti della storia di Lucca, (in Italian and Latin), Volume 5, Parte 1 Lucca: Accademia lucchese di scienze, lettere ed arti. Tipografia editrice G. Giusti, 1837.
- Bertini, Domenico. Memorie e documenti della storia di Lucca, (in Italian and Latin), Volume 5, Parte 2 Lucca: Accademia lucchese di scienze, lettere ed arti. Tipografia editrice G. Giusti, 1837.
- Bertini, Domenico. Memorie e documenti per servire alla storia di Lucca, (in Italian and Latin), Volume 5, Parte 3 Lucca: Accademia lucchese di scienze, lettere ed arti. Tipografia editrice G. Giusti, 1841.
- Brachtel, M.E. (2008). Medieval Lucca: And the Evolution of the Renaissance State. Oxford: OUP, 2008.
- Bräuer, Martin (2014). Handbuch der Kardinäle: 1846-2012 (in German). Berlin: De Gruyter. ISBN 978-3-11-026947-5.
- Cappelletti, Giuseppe (1859). Le chiese d'Italia: dalla loro origine sino ai nostri giorni (in Italian). Vol. Tomo decimoquinto (15). Venezia: G. Antonelli. pp. 467–559.
- Dinelli, Paolino (1834). Memorie e documenti per servire alla storia di Lucca, Volume 7: Sinodi della diocesi di Lucca. (in Italian and Latin). Lucca: Presso Francesco Bertini, 1834
- Guidi, P. "Serie cronologica dei vescovi e degli arcivescovi di Lucca," Schola Clericorum et Cura Animarum, Vol. V, 1905, to Vol. XI, 1911. Lucca. (in Italian)
- Guidi, P. (1924). Compendio di storia ecclesiastica lucchese dalle origini a tutto il secolo XII. (in Italian). Lucca 1924.
- Kehr, Paul Fridolin (1908). Italia pontificia (in Latin). Vol. 3 (Tomus Tertius: Etruria). Berlin: Weidmann. pp. 386–453.
- Lanzoni, Francesco (1927). Le diocesi d'Italia, dalle origini al principio del secolo VII (anno 604). (in Italian). Volume primo. Faenza: F. Lega. PP. 589-605.
- Nicolai, U. (1966). I vescovi di Lucca. (in Italian) Lucca, 1966.
- Pedemonte, A. (1915). I primi vescovi della « paroecia Lucensis ». Studio critico. (in Italian). Lucca: Baroni, 1915.
- Schwartz, Gerhard (1907). Die Besetzung der Bistümer Reichsitaliens unter den sächsischen und salischen Kaisern: mit den Listen der Bischöfe, 951-1122. (in German). Leipzig: B.G. Teubner. pp. 211–214.
- Tommasi, Girolamo (1847). Sommario della storia di Lucca. (in Italian). Firenze: G.P. Vieusseux 1847.
- Ughelli, Ferdinando; Coleti, Niccolò (1717). Italia sacra sive De Episcopis Italiae, et insularum adjacentium (in Latin). Vol. Tomus primus (1) (editio secunda, aucta et emendata ed.). Venice: apud Sebastianum Coleti. pp. 790–832.
