= Medieval Corsica =

History of Mediterranean island

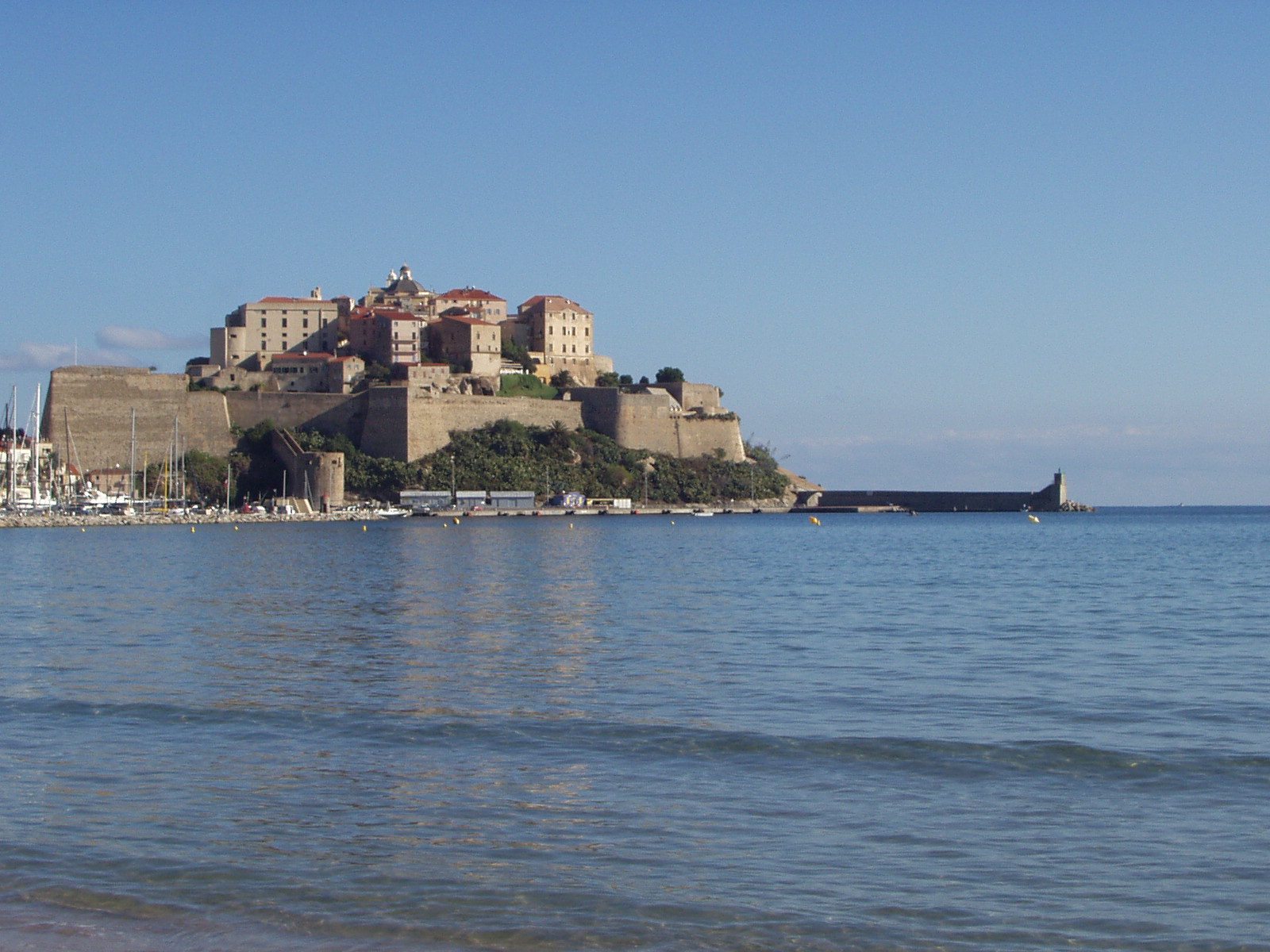
Modified medieval citadel at Calvi

The history of Corsica in the medieval period begins with the collapse of the Western Roman Empire and the invasions of various Germanic peoples in the fifth century AD, and ends with the complete subjection of the island to the authority of the Bank of San Giorgio in 1511.

== Eastern Imperial suzerainty ==
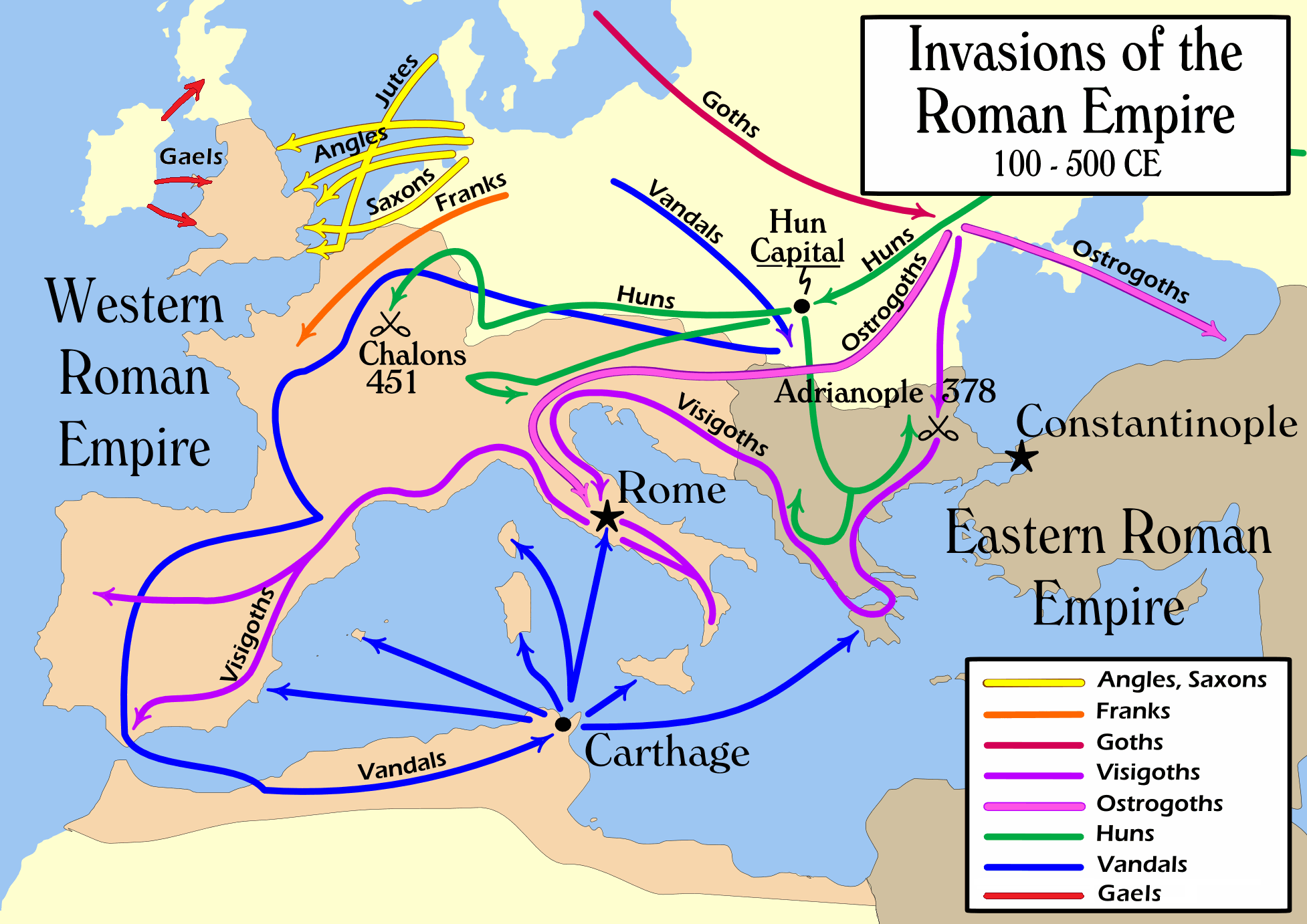
Germanic invasions of the Roman Empire. Note the Vandal invasion of Corsica. The arrows only approximate debatably large-scale people movements. There were many small movements of individuals and small groups within Europe and the Roman Empire in the so-called "Migration Period". The Vandal movement into Corsica represents a conquest and not an influx of Germanic emigrants.

=== Barbarians and Byzantines ===
In the early decades of the fifth century, effective Roman authority all but vanished from Corsica. The island became disputed between the Ostrogoths, Roman foederati who were settled in the lands along the Riviera, and the Vandals, who had established a kingdom in Tunisia. Both groups were sometimes allies, sometimes enemies of the Romans and both followed a pattern of taking over Roman legal forms and structures and maintaining nominal deference to the empire while de facto creating autonomous kingdoms within its former borders.

In 469, Gaiseric, the Vandal king, finally completed the subjugation of the isle. For the next 65 years the Vandals maintained their domination, the valuable Corsican forests supplying the wood for their pirate fleets.

After the Vandal state in Africa crumbled in the early sixth century under the onslaught of the Roman general Belisaurius, his lieutenant Cyril restored imperial rule of Corsica in 534, and the island was placed under the government of the newly organized Praetorian prefecture of Africa. However, the exarchate was not able to protect the island from the raiding by the Ostrogoths and the Lombards, who moved down into Italy from the north beginning in 568.

After the loss of the African mainland territories of the exarchate to the Umayyad dynasty in 709, the empire's power in the West deteriorated further. Saracen raiders began to prey on Corsica, leading Liutprand the Lombard to invade circa 725 to preempt Saracen designs.

== Western Imperial suzerainty ==
=== Saracens and Franks ===
The first Muslim raid on Corsica took place in 713. After this, Byzantine authority, nominal under Lombard rule, waned further and in 774, after conquering the Lombard Kingdom of Italy, the Frankish king Charlemagne proceeded to conquer Corsica for the Frankish hegemony, the Carolingian Empire, which he was establishing in western Europe.

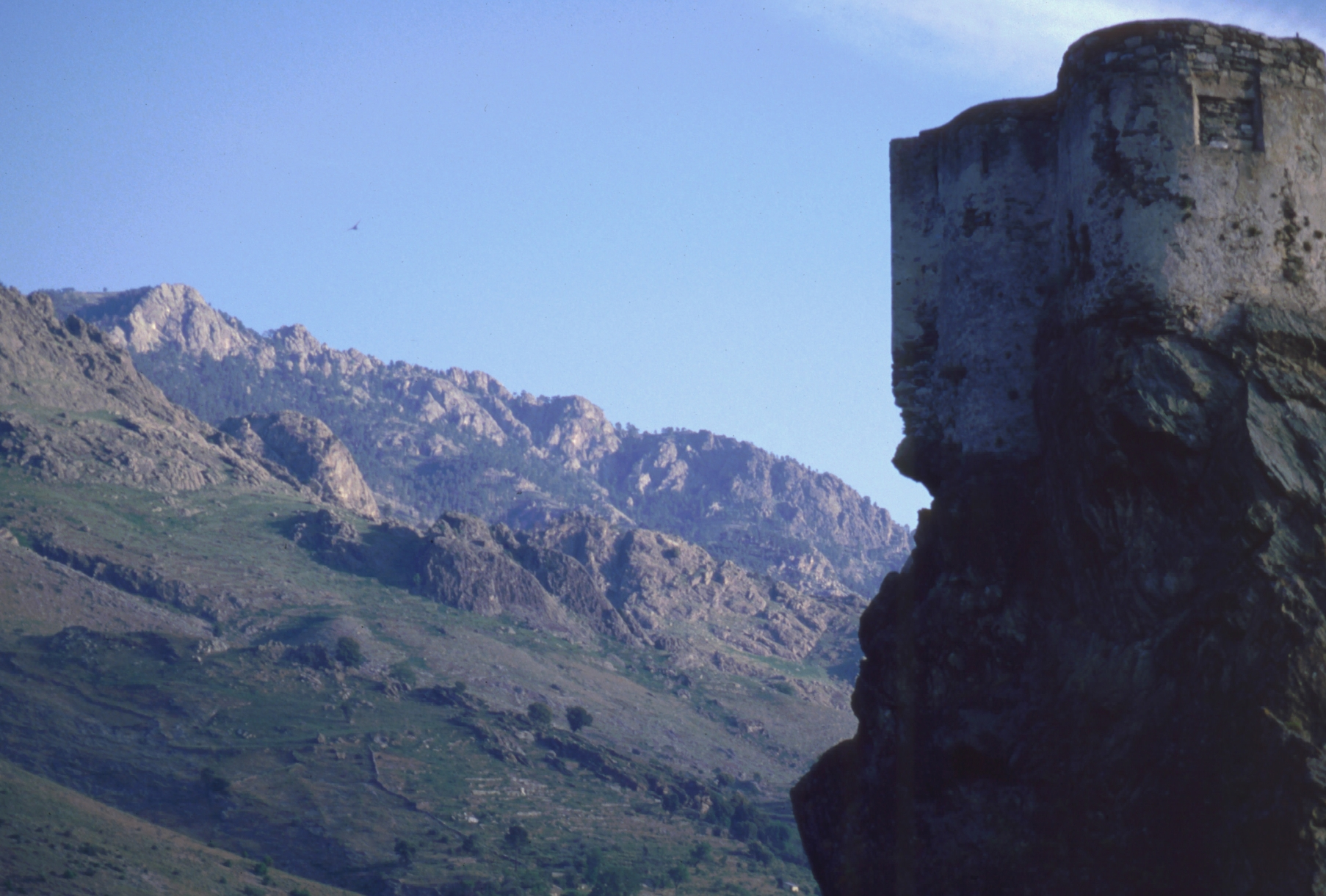
Bastion of native Corsican defence

In 806, however, the first of a series of Moorish incursions occurred from Spain. The Muslims were defeated several times by Charlemagne's lieutenants, among them his constable Burchard. Throughout 807, the Moors continually returned, and in 810 suffered a major defeat by an alliance of local powers and Charles the Younger. Nonetheless their assaults continued. In 828, the defense of Corsica was entrusted to Boniface II of Tuscany, who conducted a successful expedition against the Muslims and built the fortress that later was to bear his name (Bonifacio) in the south. For the next century, Corsica was a part of the March of Tuscany.

Boniface' son Adalbert I continued to push back against the Muslim invaders after 846; but, in spite of all efforts, they seem to have remained in possession of part of the island until about 930. The island was hit by a Fatimid raid in 935.

During his conflicts with Otto I of Germany, King Berengar II of Italy managed to make himself master of Corsica. In 962, Berengar was defeated and his son, Adalbert, fled to Corsica, whence he launched two separate attacks on Ottonian Italy, before going into exile in Burgundy.

=== Political turmoil ===
Following Otto II's reestablishment of imperial authority over Corsica, a period of political turmoil began, although the island remained subject to the margraves of Tuscany, who periodically made their power felt there. The island at this time appears to be generally divided, as it is down to the present time, into a north and a south. Throughout the island petty lords and more powerful regional potentates fought for supremacy and land. Among the lords of the south, the counts of Cinarca soon gained preeminence. Soon after 1000, at a central location in the valley of Morosaglia, a sort of national diet or assembly was held with the intent of establishing peace and the rule of law over the whole island. The movement for peace, reminiscent of the contemporary Peace and Truce of God movements in Languedoc, was headed by Sambucuccio, lord of Alando. The movement succeeded in establishing order in the north, establishing the Terra di Comune, but the south—and the Cap Corse—remained in turmoil.

The Terra was modelled along republican lines and was composed of autonomous communes. Each commune, or parish, elected a council of "fathers of the commune" who were in charge of the administration of justice under the direction of the podestà. Each podestà of an enfranchised district (or state) in turn elected a member to the supreme council, or magistracy, which was as it were the legislature of the Terra. The supreme council was called the Twelve because that was the number of enfranchised communes. Finally, as a check on their power and that of the podestà, the fathers of each commune elected a caporale charged with looking out for the interests of the poor and defenceless.

In 1012, in a final effort to subdue the wild barons of the south and the northern cape, the Terra called in William, Margrave of Massa. By 1020 he had succeeded in driving the count of Cinarca out of the island and enforcing peace, or at least reduced violence, on the southern barons. He allied with the communes and was able to hand Corsica on to his son, but his legacy was not one of unity and central government.

== Papal fief ==
Towards the end of the eleventh century, the Papacy laid claim to Corsica, saying it had been donated to the Church by Charlemagne. In fact, all Charlemagne had done was promise that stolen ecclesiastical lands would be returned. Nevertheless, the clergy of Corsica supported the Papacy. In 1077, Pope Gregory VII wrote a letter addressed to the Corsican church, regretting that the Papacy had for so long neglected the island and announcing that he was sending Landulf, bishop of Pisa, as his apostolic legate to the island. In 1092, Pope Urban II raised the bishopric of Pisa to an archbishopric and gave it authority over the Corsican church.

Pisa replaced the papal legates who were governing the island with judges (judices) of their own appointment. Valuable chiefly as a source of timber for the Pisan fleet, but also as an important transit point for the slave trade, Corsica flourished under Pisan sovereignty, but crises soon arose. The Corsican episcopate resented Pisan overlordship and the rival Republic of Genoa schemed to have Rome reverse the grant of 1077. The archbishops of Genoa soon challenged Pisa's authority in Corsica. Pope Calixtus II granted Pisa the right to consecrate all of the island's six bishops in 1123, but Innocent II divided this right between the archdioceses in 1133. Genoa could consecrate the bishops of Accia, Nebbio and Mariana, Pisa those of Ajaccio, Aleria and Sagona.

The period of Pisan ascendancy in the final quarter of the eleventh century and first of the twelfth has become the mythical pax pisana ("Pisan peace") of Corsican memory. In the second half of the twelfth century, the war between the two ecclesiastic–economic rivals escalated and in 1195 Genoa captured Bonifacio. It has been said that "Pisa lost" the war for supremacy in Sardinia and Corsica in that year. The next twenty years were occupied by unrelenting Pisan efforts to recapture it. In 1217, Pope Honorius III granted the archbishop of Genoa special rights in Bonifacio. The Genoese also granted the inhabitants civic rights and limited self-government, in order to attract colonists. They adopted a similar policy at their own foundation of Calvi in 1278.

== Regnum Corsicae ==
=== Genoese supremacy ===
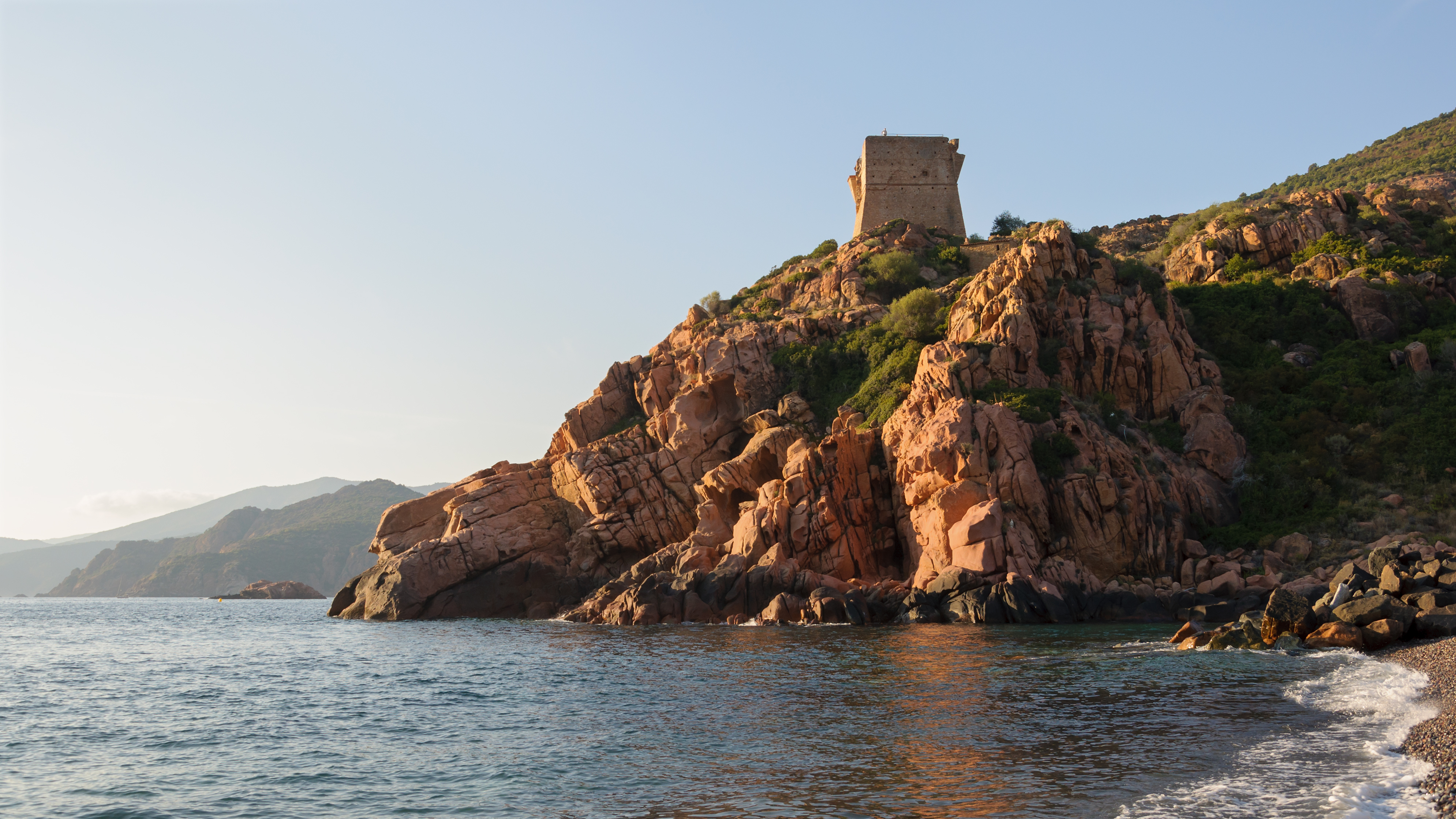
The Genoese tower in Porto, Ota

During the 13th century, the feud between Pisa and Genoa introduced the struggle between Guelph and Ghibelline to Corsica also. In the course of the feud, the Terra di Comune invited Isnard Malaspina, a distant relative of William of Massa, to put a stop to the turmoil. A Count of Cinarca was reinstated and the war between Malaspina, Cinarca, Pisa, and Genoa dragged on with no side gaining the mastery until 1298, when Pope Boniface VIII formally bestowed the regnum Corsicae, Kingdom of Corsica, on James II of Aragon along with the regnum Sardiniae, Kingdom of Sardinia.

In 1325, James finally set out to conquer his dual island kingdom. Sardinia was attacked and the Pisans were destroyed. Unable to sustain themselves at sea, their fortunes in Corsica fell off abruptly. No comparable campaign, however, was launched at Corsica by the king. In 1347, after years of more political turmoil, a diet of caporali and barons offered the Genoese republic the sovereignty of the isle. By the agreement with Genoa, regular tribute was to be paid, but the Corsicans were allowed to retain their own laws and customs, to be governed by their own bodies, the Twelve in the north and a new council of Six in the south, and be represented at Genoa by an orator. It was, however, an inauspicious year. The Black Death arrived in Genoa in October and when it hit Corsica in the next months it decimated it, killing off perhaps two thirds of the population.

=== Aragonese interference ===
The feudal baronage of the south and the hereditary caporali of the north alike resisted the authority of the Genoese governors and Peter IV of Aragon took the opportunity to reassert his claims. In 1372, Arrigo della Rocca with Aragonese troops conquered the island, but the barons of Cape Corso appealed for aid to Genoa. Distracted Genoa charted a company of five members, known as the Maona, to govern the island (1378). The Maona partnered with Arrigo, but in 1380 four of the governors of the Maona resigned and this left the lone remaining governor, Leonello Lomellino, as sole governor. He built Bastia on the northern coast to safeguard Genoese interests and when Arrigo died in 1401, he became the sole ruler of Corsica.

Meanwhile, Genoa itself had fallen into the hands of the French, and in 1407 Leonello Lomellino returned as governor with the title of Count of Corsica bestowed on him by Charles VI of France. But Vincentello d'Istria, who had gained distinction in the service of the Crown of Aragon, had captured Cinarca, rallied around him all the communes of the Terra and proclaimed himself Count of Corsica at Biguglia, even seizing Bastia. Lomellino was unable to make headway against him and, by 1410, all Corsica, with the exception of Bonifacio and Calvi, was lost to Genoa, now once more independent of France. A feud between Vincentello and the Bishop of Mariana, however, led to the loss of his authority in the Terra di Comune and he was compelled to go to Spain in search of assistance. In his absence the Genoese reconquered the island.

At this stage, the Western Schism was underway and Corsica was divided between the Genoa's suffragan sees declaring for Benedict XIII and Pisa's for John XXIII. When Vincentello returned with an Aragonese force he was able to profit from the chaos. He easily captured Cinarca and Ajaccio, came to terms with the Pisan bishops, conquered the Terra di Comune, and built a strong castle at Corte. By 1419 the Genoese possessions in Corsica were again reduced to Bonifacio and Calvi.

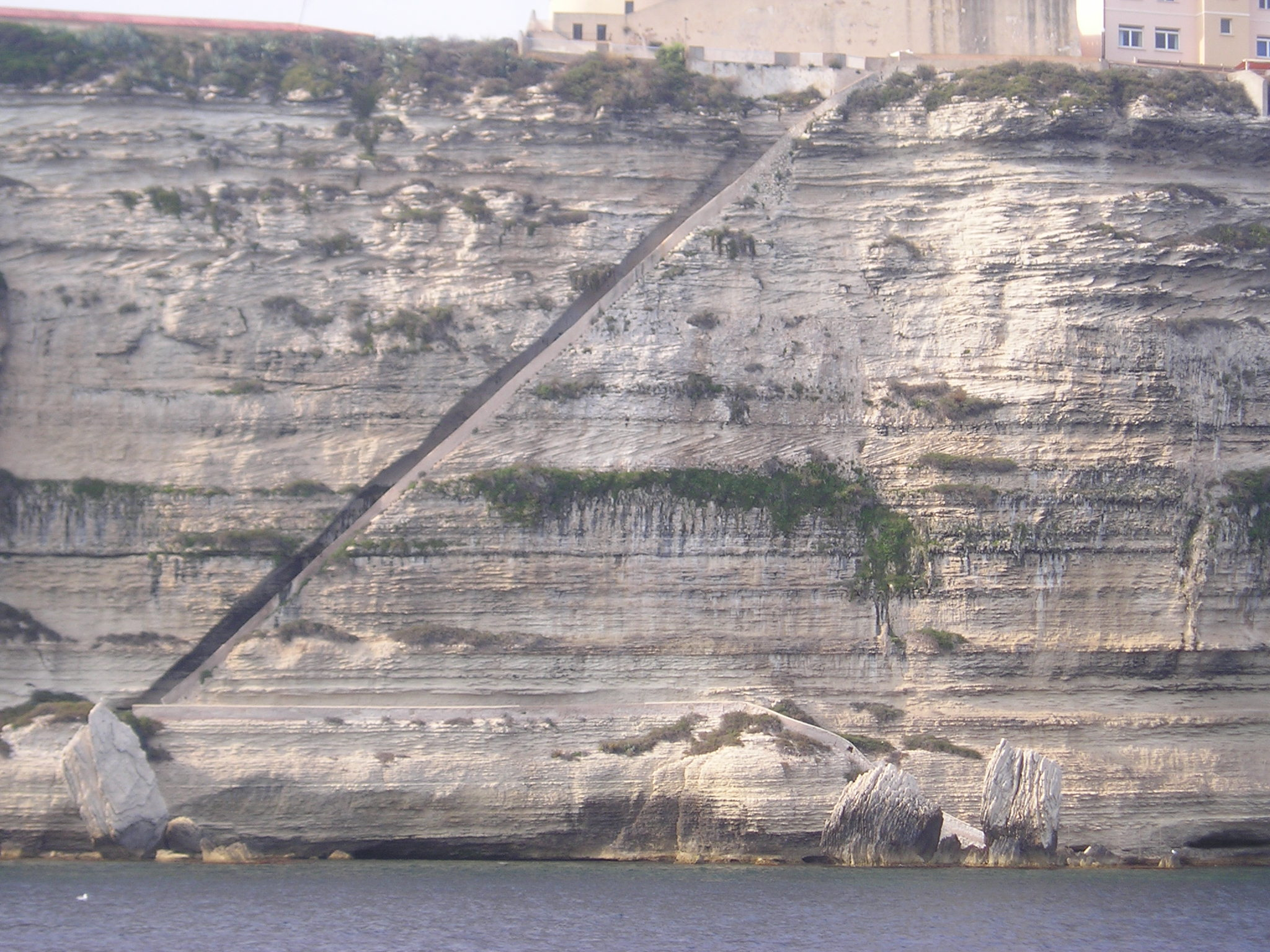
The "Stairway of the King of Aragon". Legendarily carved out of the steep cliff face before Bonifacio in a single night during Alfonso V's siege of the town, in fact it was a much older Franciscan construction devised to allow easy access to a water source at the base for their monastery.

In 1421, Alfonso V of Aragon landed with a large fleet to take possession of his "kingdom." He took Calvi, but Bonifacio held out, and his stern imposition of taxes incited general revolt. Forced to lift the siege of Bonifacio and confirm its privileges, Alfonso left Corsica little better off than it was before he came. Bonifacio remained a de facto independent republic under Genoese protection and Vincentello was ultimately unable to put down the general insurrection before the Genoese captured him at Bastia in 1435. He was subsequently executed as a "rebel" himself.

In 1441, the Genoese scored a pivotal victory over the Aragonese. Using advanced artillery, the Doge of Genoa, Tomaso di Campofregoso, defeated the Aragonese general Paolo della Rocca. To secure Genoese authority he built and fortified the new city of San Fiorenzo, near the ruins of Nebbio. However, the civil war between Aragon and Genoa continued until a new height of disorder had been reached. In 1444, Pope Eugene IV dispatched an army of 14,000 to pacify the island, but it was routed by a league formed of some caporali and the barons under the leadership of Rinuccio da Leca. A second papal expedition was more successful: Rinuccio was killed at Biguglia. It was Eugene's successor, however, who was to determine the fate of Corsica. Nicholas V was a Genoese himself. In the year of his succession (1447), he promptly granted all his rights in Corsica and all the fortresses held by his troops to the Genoese. However, the south remained under the sway of the counts of Cinarca, nominally vassals of Aragon, and the Terra di Comune was under the control of Galeazzo da Campofregoso.

=== Rule of the Bank ===
In the years that followed, the leaders of the Terra offered the government of the island to the Company (or Bank) of San Giorgio, a commercial corporation established at Genoa in the previous century. The bank accepted, the Aragonese were driven from the country, and a central government was organised. But the bank soon fell foul of the barons, and began a war of extermination against them. Their resistance was finally broken in 1460, when the survivors took refuge in Tuscany. But order had scarcely been established when the Genoese Tommasino da Campofregoso, whose mother was a Corsican, revived the claims of his family and succeeded in mastering the interior of the island (1462). Two years later (1464) the Francesco Sforza, Duke of Milan, overthrew the power of the Campofregoso family at Genoa and promptly proceeded to lay claim to Corsica. His lieutenant had no difficulty in making the island accept the overlordship of Milan; but when, in 1466, Francesco Sforza died, a quarrel broke out, and Milanese suzerainty became purely nominal save in the coastal towns. Finally, in 1484, Tommasino persuaded the duke to grant him the government of the island. The strong places were handed over to him and he entered into a marital relation with Gian Paolo da Leca, the most powerful of the barons. He was soon supreme in the island.

Within three years, the Corsicans were in revolt again. They sought the support of Jacopo IV d'Appiano, now Prince of Piombino, a descendant of the Malaspinas who had once ruled in Corsica. His brother Gherardo, Count of Montagnano, accepted the call, proclaimed himself Count of Corsica, and, landing in the island, captured Biguglia and San Fiorenzo; whereupon Tommasino da Campo Fregoso discreetly sold his rights to the Bank of San Giorgio. The Bank, allied with the Gian Paolo da Leca, defeated Gherardo only to find the Fregoso attempting to repudiate their bargain. Gian Paolo supported the Fregoso, but the Bank, after hard fighting, exiled him to Sardinia. Twice he returned, and he was not finally expelled from the country till 1500. It was not until 1511 that the other barons were crushed and the Bank had established island-wide rule.

== Sources ==
- Jordan, William Chester (2003). Europe in the High Middle Ages. London: Viking.
- Tabacco, Giovanni (1989). The Struggle for Power in Medieval Italy: Structures and Political Rule. Cambridge Medieval Textbooks. Cambridge: Cambridge University Press.
- Tangheroni, Marco (1999). "Sardinia and Corsica from the Mid-Twelfth to the Early Fourteenth Century". In Abulafia, David (ed.). The New Cambridge Medieval History. Vol. 5. Cambridge: Cambridge University Press. pp. 447–57.
