= Diocese of Mariana and Accia =

The Diocese of Mariana and Acci or Diocese of Accia and Mariana (Latin: Dioecesis Acciensis et Marianensis) was a Roman Catholic ecclesiastical territory. It is now a titular see.

== History ==
The Diocese of Mariana was a Roman Catholic diocese seated in the Ancient Roman city of Mariana, Corsica. Traditionally it was claimed to have existed already in the time of the apostles, but there is no evidence for that; the whole of Corsica was apparently Christianised by 439.

The diocese was united with the diocese of Accia (or Acci) in 1563, and known thereafter as the diocese of Mariana and Accia. The bishop of Mariana and Accia transferred his episcopal seat from Mariana in 1440 to Vescovato Cathedral and again in 1570 to Bastia Cathedral. The bishopric was suppressed in 1801 in favour of the diocese of Ajaccio, along with all other Corsican bishoprics.

The title of Bishop of Mariana in Corsica continues in use.

== Bishops ==
=== Diocese of Mariana ===
...

- Josephus Maranensis (1179)

...

- Pandulfus (1242)
- Opizo Cortinco (ca. 1260)
- Adam (attested 1283, 1298)
- Guido (ca. 1320)

...

- Bonaventura de Fabriano, O.Min. (1343 – ca. 1350)
- Dominicus de Campotaxio (ca. 1350)
- Raimundus, O.P. (1351 – 1352)
- Joannes de Castello, O.Min. (1353 – )
- Petrus Raimundi, O.Carm. (1364 – 1366)
- Nicolas of Liguria, O.P. (1366 – 1390)
- Bonaventura (ca. 1380)
- Joannes de Omessa (1388 – 1428) (appointed by Urban VI)
- Dominicus de Urbetello (1428 – 1434)
- Gregorio Fieschi (1434 – 1436)
- Michael de Germanis (Michele de'Germani) (1436 – 1458)
- Germano da Monte Negro, O.Min. (O.P.?) (1458 – 1465)
- Leonardo de' Fornari (1465 – 1494)
- Ottaviano de' Fornari (1495 – 1500)
- Giovanni Battista Usumari (Usodimari) (1500 – 1512)
- Giovanni Battista Cybo (1512 – 1531), Administrator
- Cardinal Innocenzo Cybo (1531), Administrator
- Cesare Cybo (1532 – 1548)
- Ottaviano Cybo (1548 – 1550)
- Baldovino da Barga (1550 – 1554)
- Cardinal Giovanni Battista Cicala (1554 – 1560), Administrator
- Nicolaus Cicala (1560 – 1570)

=== Diocese of Accia ===
Erected: 824
Latin Name: Acciensis

...

- Giovanni Andrea de Bussi (3 Mar 1463 - 23 Jul 1466 Appointed, Bishop of Aleria)
- Antonio de Bonaumbra (4 May 1467 - 1480 Died)
- Paolo Fregoso (Campofregoso) (26 Mar 1493 - 21 Feb 1494 Resigned)
- Domenico Valdettaro (Valletaro) (21 Aug 1500 - 1521 Resigned)
- Bernardino de Luca (16 Oct 1521 - 1536 Resigned)
- Benedetto de Nobili (1536 - 1545 Resigned)
- Jérome Buccaurati (26 Aug 1545 - 1547 Died)
- Pierre de Affatatis (14 Feb 1547 - 3 Jul 1553 Appointed, Bishop of Minori)
- Agostino Maria Salvago, O.P. (18 Aug 1553 - 17 Apr 1559 Appointed, Archbishop of Genoa)
- Giulio Soperchio, O. Carm. (14 Feb 1560 - 30 Jan 1563 Appointed, Bishop of Caorle)

=== Diocese of Accia and Mariana ===
United: 30 January 1563 with the Diocese of Mariana
Latin Name: Dioecesis Acciensis et Marianensis
Metropolitan: Archdiocese of Genova

- Nicolo Cicala (1563 - 1566 Resigned)
- Girolamo Leone (1566 - 1570 Died)
- Giovanni Battista Centurione (4 Sep 1570 - 8 Jun 1584 Appointed, Bishop of Savona)
- Nicolò Mascardi (9 Apr 1584 - 1599 Died)
- Geronimo del Pozzo (29 Nov 1599 - 1622 Resigned)
- Giulio del Pozzo (11 Jul 1622 - 1644 Died)
- Giovanni Agostino Marliani (15 Jul 1645 - 1656 Resigned)
- Carlo Fabrizio Giustiniani (10 Jan 1656 - 1 Sep 1682 Died)
- Agostino Fieschi, C.R. (14 Jun 1683 - 28 May 1685 Died)
- Jean Charles de Mari, C.R. (1 Apr 1686 - 30 Apr 1704 Resigned)
- Mario Emmanuelle Durazzo (19 May 1704 - Jun 1707 Died)
- Andrea Della Rocca, C.R.L. (28 Nov 1707 - Mar 1720 Died)
- Agostino Saluzzo (3 Jul 1720 - 1747 Died)
- Dominico Maria Saporiti (31 Jul 1747 - Apr 1772 Died)
- Nicolas Stefanini (7 Sep 1772 Confirmed - 29 Jan 1775 Died)
- François Cittadella (29 May 1775 Confirmed - 30 Sep 1781 Died)
- Pierre Peineau du Verdier, C.O. (25 Feb 1782 Confirmed - 3 Nov 1788 Died)
- Ignace-François de Joannis de Verclos (30 Mar 1789 Confirmed - 1 May 1801 Died)

== See also ==
- Roman Catholic Diocese of Mariana in Corsica
- Catholic Church in France
- List of Catholic dioceses in France

== Books ==
- Cappelletti, Giuseppe (1861). Le chiese d'Italia Tomo decimosesto Venezia: Giuseppe Antonelli. Retrieved: 2016-10-26.
- Eubel, Conradus, ed. (1913). Hierarchia catholica, Tomus 1 (second ed.). Münster: Libreria Regensbergiana. (in Latin)
- Eubel, Conradus, ed. (1914). Hierarchia catholica, Tomus 2 (2nd ed.). Münster: Libreria Regensbergiana.
- Eubel, Conradus; Gulik, Guilelmus (1923). Hierarchia catholica, Tomus 3 (2nd ed.). Münster: Libreria Regensbergiana.
- Gams, Pius Bonifatius (1873). Series episcoporum Ecclesiae catholicae: quotquot innotuerunt a beato Petro apostolo (in Latin). Ratisbon: Typis et Sumptibus Georgii Josephi Manz.
- Gauchat, Patritius (Patrice) (1935). Hierarchia catholica IV (1592-1667). Münster: Libraria Regensbergiana.
- Pisani, Paul (1907). Répertoire biographique de l'épiscopat constitutionnel (1791-1802) (in French). Paris: A. Picard et fils.
- Ritzler, Remigius; Sefrin, Pirminus (1952). Hierarchia catholica medii et recentis aevi V (1667-1730). Patavii: Messagero di S. Antonio.
- Ritzler, Remigius; Sefrin, Pirminus (1958). Hierarchia catholica medii et recentis aevi VI (1730-1799). Patavii: Messagero di S. Antonio.
- Ughelli, Ferdinando; Coleti, Niccolò (1719). Italia sacra sive De episcopis Italiæ, et insularum adjacentium (in Latin). Vol. Tomus quartus (4). Venice: apud Sebastianum Coleti. pp. 999–1004.

== Sources and external links ==
- Catholic Hierarchy: Diocese of Mariana ^{[self-published]}
- Catholic Hierarchy: Diocese of Acci and Mariana ^{[self-published]}
- Catholic Hierarchy: Diocese of Mariana in Corsica ^{[self-published]}
- Commune de Vescovato (Casinca): patrimoine communale (in French)
- Catholic Encyclopedia: Corsica
- GCatholic.org: Titular Episcopal See of Mariana en Corse
