= San Parteo Church =

Church in Haute-Corse, France

San Parteo Church Chapelle de San-Parteo
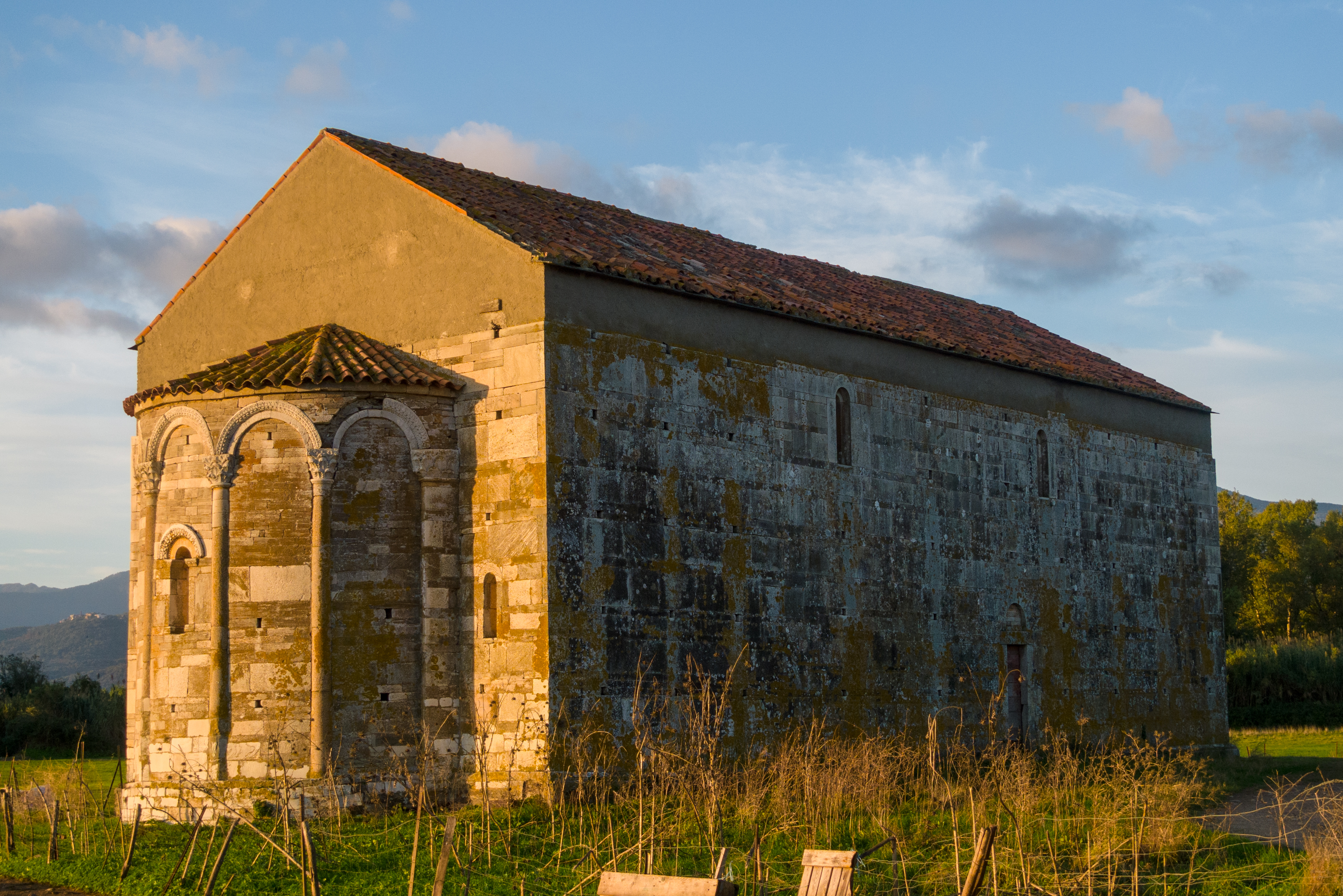
- San Parteo Church near Lucciana

Religion
- Affiliation: Roman Catholic
- Region: Haute-Corse
- Status: Active

Location
- Location: Corsica, France
- Interactive map of San Parteo Church; Chapelle de San-Parteo
- Coordinates: 42.5381°N 9.4889°E

Architecture
- Type: church
- Groundbreaking: 11th century

San Parteo Church or San Perteo Church (French: Chapelle de San-Parteo) is a Pisan-Romanesque church located in Corsica, France. It is a listed historical monument since 1886.

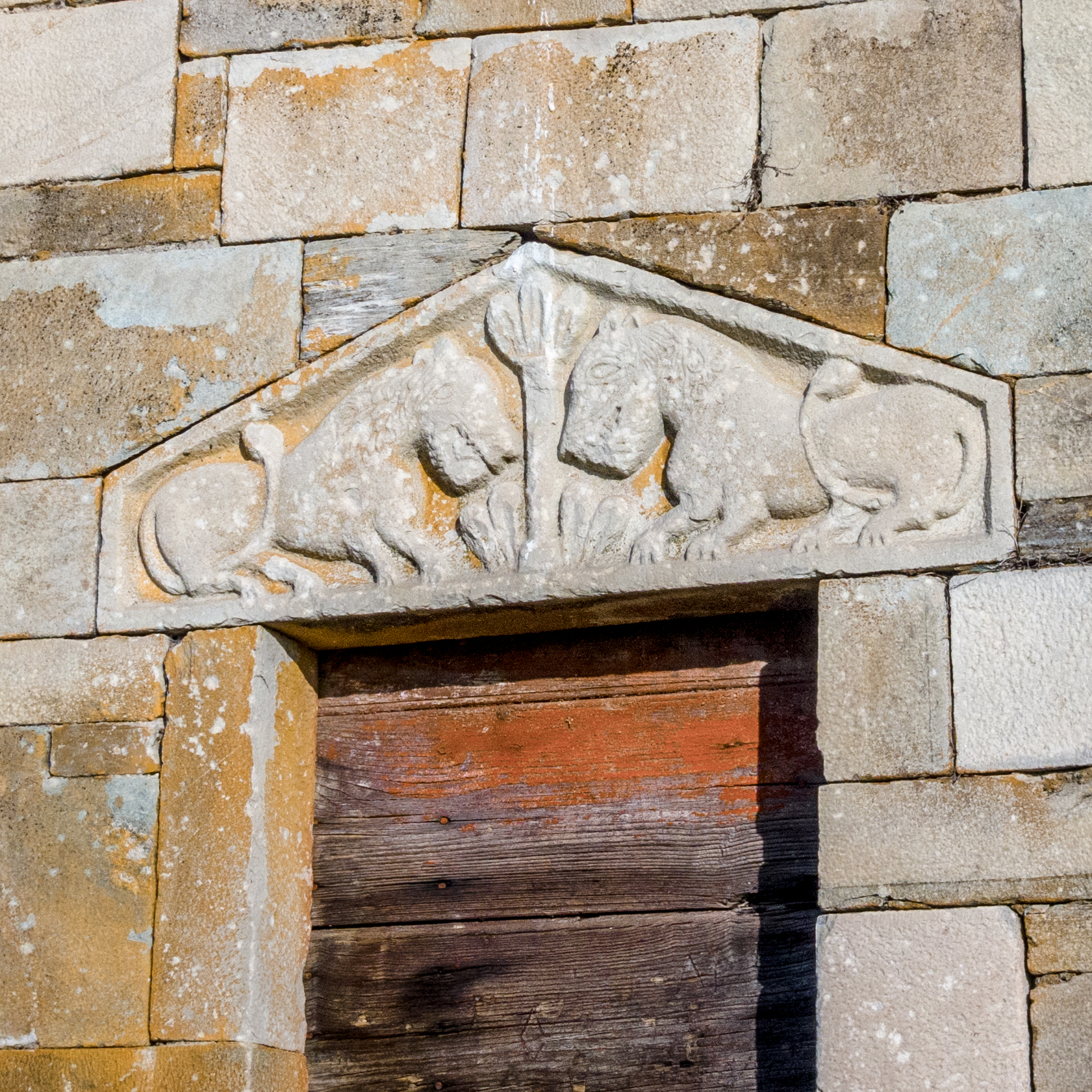
Carved lintel

The edifice dates to the 11th and 12th century. It takes its name from the fifth century San Parteo, a saint of regional renown. San Parteo Church lies near the Roman town of Mariana, about 550 metres (1,800 ft) to the west of the Church of Santa Maria Assunta (La Canonica).

The church is described as having a "grandly sober style". It is built over a pagan cemetery, and the lintel of a portal is decorated with a Middle Eastern motif; two lions guarding the Tree of Knowledge in the Garden of Eden.
