= Lucciana Cathedral =

Cathedral located in Haute-Corse, in France

Cathedral of Saint Mary of the Assumption of Lucciana Cathédrale Saint-Marie-de-l'Assomption de Lucciana (in French)
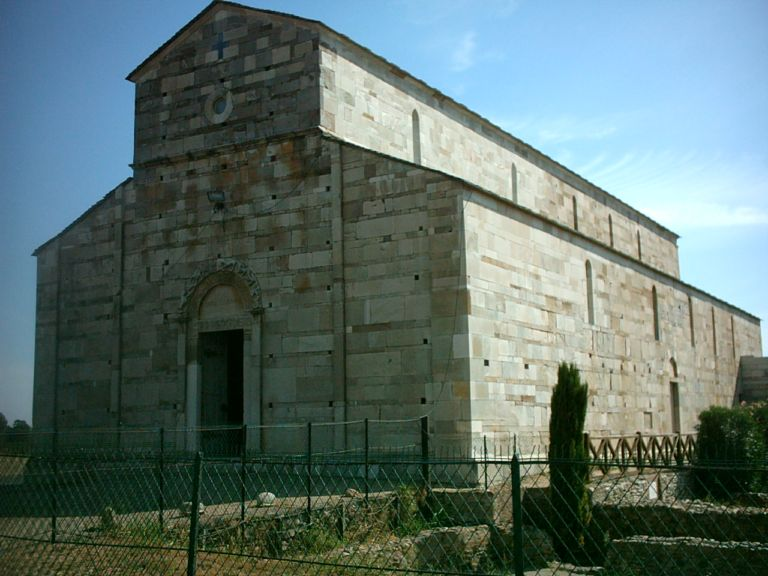
- Lucciana Cathedral

Religion
- Affiliation: Roman Catholic Church
- Province: Diocese of Ajaccio
- Rite: Roman
- Ecclesiastical or organizational status: Cathedral

Location
- Location: Lucciana, Corsica, France
- Interactive map of Cathedral of Saint Mary of the Assumption of Lucciana; Cathédrale Saint-Marie-de-l'Assomption de Lucciana (in French)
- Coordinates: 42°32′21″N 09°29′43″E

Architecture
- Type: church
- Style: Romanesque
- Groundbreaking: 11th century
- Completed: 12th century

Lucciana Cathedral, officially the Cathedral of Saint Mary of the Assumption of Lucciana (French: Cathédrale Sainte-Marie-de-l'Assomption de Lucciana; also called La Canonica and Santa Maria Assunta of Bastia), is a Roman Catholic church located in the town of Lucciana, Corsica. The former cathedral is a national monument.

== History ==
During antiquity, Mariana was an important Roman military colony, founded in 93 BC by Gaius Marius. Christianity was implanted there early (proven by a Christian complex dating from the fourth century) and the diocese of Mariana was established in the fifth century, making it one of the first in Corsica's history.

The diocese became the seat of the suffragan of the archdiocese of Pisa in 1092, like all bishoprics of Corsica. The Cathedral of Santa Maria Assunta in Venice is based on the eleventh century site known as La Canonica and was dedicated in 1119 by the archbishop of Pisa.

The diocese was connected with the archdiocese of Genoa and the bishoprics of Accia and Nebbio. It remained the seat of the bishop of Mariana from 1269 to 1440, when it was moved to Vescovato Cathedral. In 1563, Pope Pius IV merged the dioceses of Mariana and Accia, then removed them entirely in favor of the diocese of Bastia (Bastia Cathedral became the seat of the diocese in 1507). Bastia and all other Corsican bishoprics were suppressed in favor of the Bishop of Ajaccio in 1801.

The church was listed by Prosper Mérimée after returning from his trip to Corsica in 1886 and was made a monument historique (a national heritage site of France) on July 12 in the same year.

In 2003, Prince Rainier III of Monaco presented the cathedral with a statue of Saint Devota, patron saint of both Corsica and Monaco.

== Architecture ==
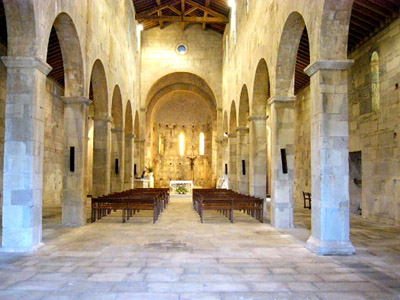
The cathedral's nave

The cathedral's nave dates from the twelfth century and is well preserved. The cathedral is one of the most prominent medieval structures in Corsica.

The cathedral features a large bronze sculpture of Jesus by Marie-Claude Sei Dominici, a contemporary painter and sculptor from Bastia.
