= Vescovato Cathedral =

Catholic church in Vescovato, Corsica

Coordinates: 42°29′36″N 9°26′23″E

Vescovato Cathedral Pro-cathédrale Saint-Martin de Vescovato
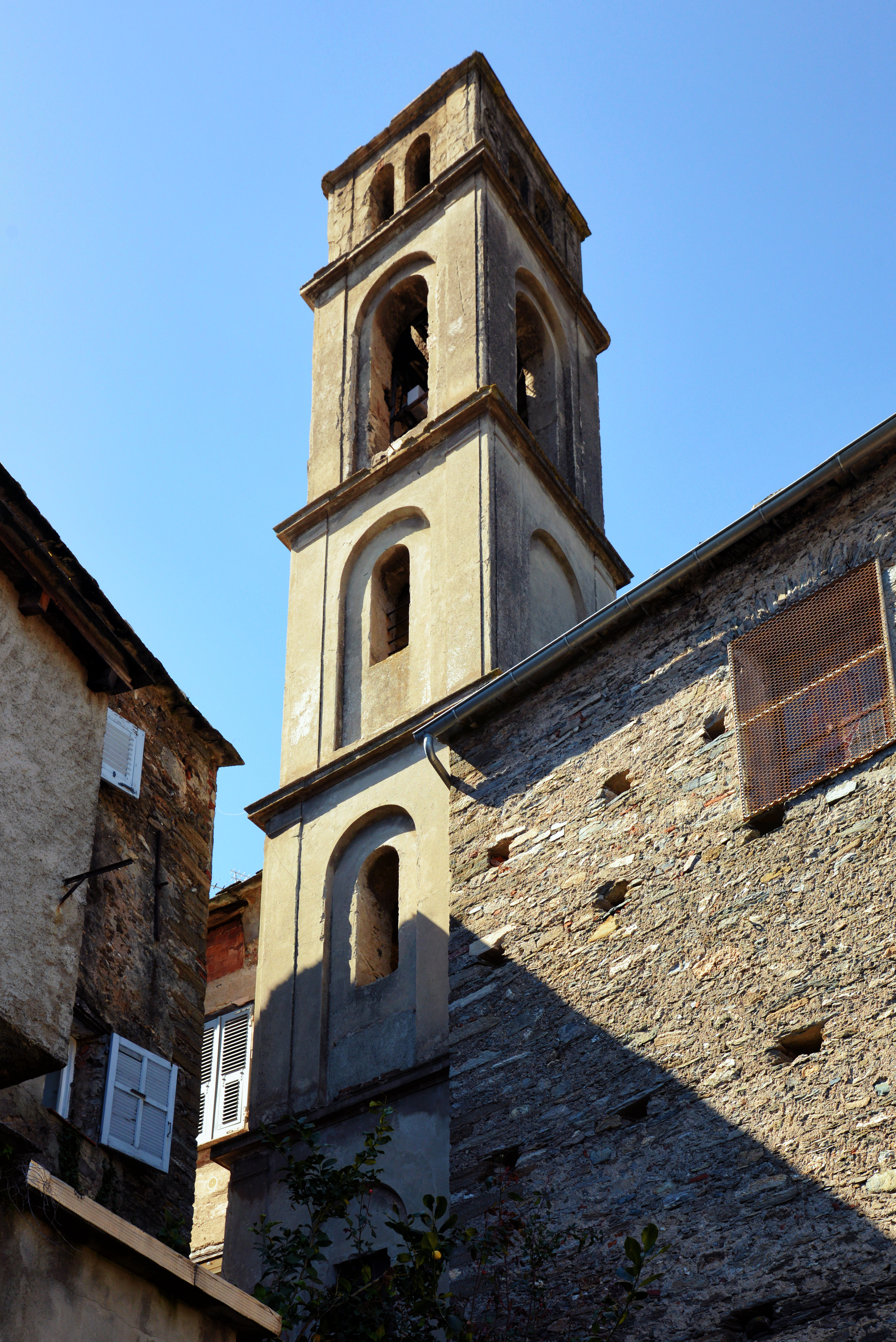
- Vescovato Cathedral

Religion
- Affiliation: Roman Catholic Church
- Province: Bishop of Ajaccio
- Region: Corsica
- Rite: Roman
- Ecclesiastical or organisational status: Cathedral
- Status: Active

Location
- Location: Vescovato, France
- Interactive map of Vescovato Cathedral; Pro-cathédrale Saint-Martin de Vescovato

Architecture
- Type: church
- Groundbreaking: 14th century
- Completed: 15th century

Vescovato Cathedral (Pro-cathédrale Saint-Martin de Vescovato) is a Catholic church in Vescovato, Corsica. It was the seat of a Roman Catholic diocese between 1440 and 1570. The cathedral is now the parish church of St. Martin.

The Bishop of Mariana built the church here in 1380. After the church had been enlarged and ornamented in 1436 the seat of the diocese of Mariana was moved from its former location in Lucciana Cathedral to Vescovato in 1440. It was transferred in 1570 to Bastia Cathedral.

All Corsican bishoprics were suppressed in favour of the Bishop of Ajaccio in 1801.
