= Roman Catholic Diocese of Mariana =

Roman Catholic Diocese of Mariana may refer to the following Latin Catholic jurisdictions :

- the former Roman Catholic Diocese of Mariana in Corsica, suppressed (after name change to Roman Catholic Diocese of Mariana and Acci), but again a titular see under the name Mariana in Corsica
- the former Roman Catholic Diocese of Mariana in Brazil, now a Metropolitan Archdiocese
