= Arrigo della Rocca =

- Elected count of Corsica
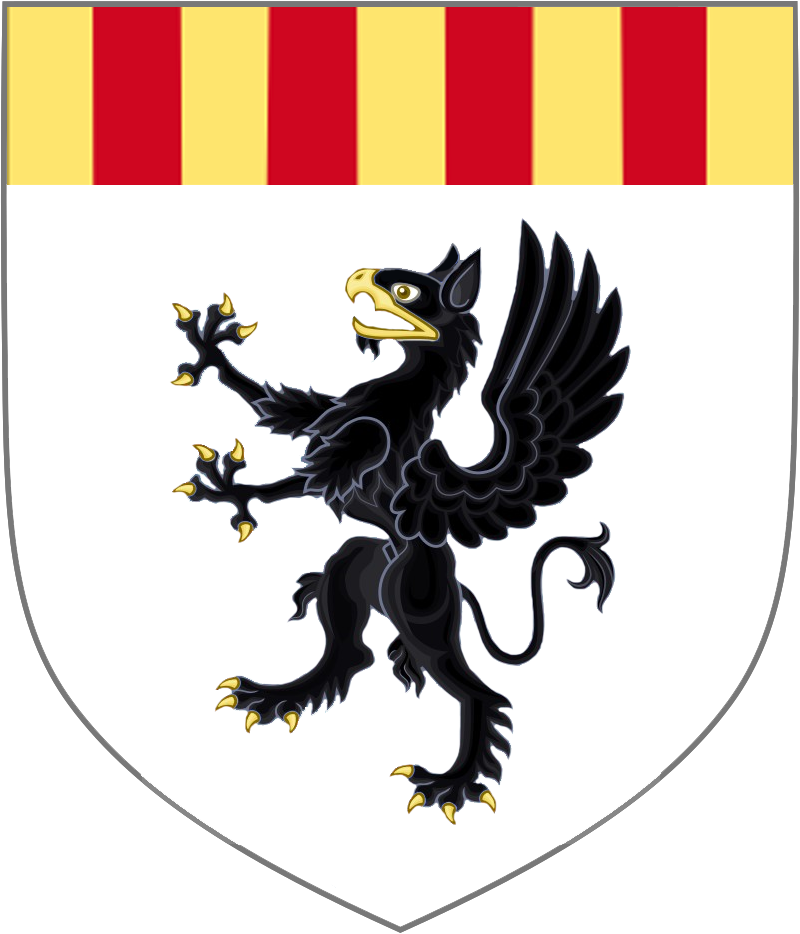
- Reign: 1373 – June 1401
- Died: June 1401; Frasso, Corsica
- Father: Goglierlmo della Rocca

Arrigo Della Rocca (Corsican: Arrigu) was a nobleman who dominated the political life of Corsica during the second half of the 14th century. Partisan of an aristocratic regime, he was supported by the Crown of Aragon and opposed by the plebeians and the Republic of Genoa.

== Family ==
His father, Guglielmo, was a lord of the Banda dei Fuori family, located in Rocca, one of the five great noble clans of the south of the island, known of the Cinarchesi. Since 1299, Corsica had been colonized by the Republic of Genoa in a bid to impose its domination over the whole Western Mediterranean against the rival Crown of Aragon. The Aragonese had a claim on the sovereignty over the island and intended to add Corsica to their empire as they already controlled Sardegna and Sicily.

In 1340, Guglielmo della Rocca was nominated vicar of the Genoese governor in charge of the southern half of the island. Maybe stirred by the consequences of the Black Death, the political framework in Corsica started evolving fast and the lords' rule was contested by the popolari who found immediate support from the first elected Genoese doge Simone Boccanegra.

According to the medieval custom, Guglielmo had been forced to offer his son as a hostage to the Republic, in effect, a token of his allegiance. Still, in 1353, unable to stand the recent political evolution, he rebelled against Genoa and declared himself openly in favour of Aragon. He was promptly defeated and died mysteriously in 1354.

== Soldier of fortune ==
Arrigo was held hostage for two years in Genoa but managed to escape during a revolt in 1356. Back in Corsica, he was confronted with the great anti-feudal revolt of 1357 but managed to escape to Catalonia. There, along with a number of Corsican exiles, he joined the army of the king and fought for him against the Sardenians rebels.

In the early 1370s, Corsica was bitterly divided between two popolari parties, the Rusticacci and the Caggionacci, and the Genoese grip over the island was further weakened by a prolonged dearth. In February 1372, Arrigo landed in Valinco with a group of Aragonese soldiers and quickly rallied the south of the island (where the aristocratic party was still strong) to his cause.

The Genoese put Franceschino d'Evisa, one of the leaders of the 1357 rebellion, in charge of a small army with the mission of driving Arrigo out of Corsica. But Arrigo had Franceschino assassinated and rapidly conquered the rest of the island except the two Genoese fortresses of Bonifacio and Calvi. In 1373, at the assembly of Biguglia, Arrigo della Rocca was elected count of Corsica.

== Feudal reaction ==
Arrigo recognized the sovereignty of the Aragonese king over the island but, in 1376, he had to face a first Genoese attempt to re-take Corsica. Finally, in 1378, an uneasy peace was signed between the king and the Republic. But the same year, the Genoese created the maona di Corsica, an association of creditors to the state who had been offered the fiscal revenues of the islands in exchange of funds to re-conquer it.

The maonesi were initially successful and Arrigo was compelled to retreat into the south of the island. Using diplomacy, the Genoese then offered him to integrate the maona as a shareholder and he accepted. In the south of the island, he established a new administration based on the feudal system and backed by the great Cinarchesi families. Aware of the danger posed by this independent power at their doorstep, the moanesi launched a military operation against the South in 1379 but they were routed and forced back into their northern strongholds.

For a dozen years, Arrigo kept the maonesis at bay and supported the Aragonese imperial ambition as far as Palermo. In exchange, he was offered a number of revenues in Sargengna by the king. But in 1392, the Republic of Genoa dissolved the maona and funded directly a new invasion of Corsica. Arrigo and his son Anton-Lorenzo were forced to flee to Aragon.

== Popolari leader ==
In 1394, Arrigo returned to Corsica, once more with a troop of Aragonese soldiers. He rapidly reconquered the island, but this time he did not seek the support of the Cinarchesi who had betrayed him two years earlier and sided with the Genoese. On the contrary, he rested his legitimacy on the defense of the rights of the people, becoming de facto the leader of the anti-aristocratic popolari party.

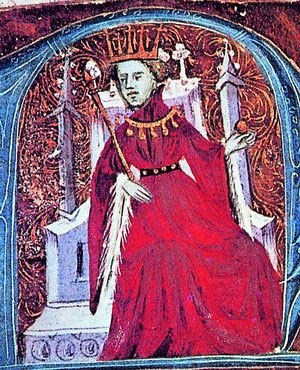
Martin I of Aragon who visited Corsica in the winter of 1397

The new rule felt so secure that in 1397, the king of Aragon, Martin I, could tour the island. The same year, a new Genoese attempt to reconquer Corsica is crushed at the battle of Biguglia. The next year a new Genoese attack was mounted under Raffaelle de Montaldo, Arrigo once more was pushed south. In 1400, he assembled an army to re-conquer the ground he had lost, but the following spring as he prepared to march north, an epidemics of plague broke out. Numerous soldiers and civilians died from the disease and Arrigo himself was struck. He died in Frasso in June 1401.

== See also ==
- Medieval Corsica
