= Girolamo Codebò =

17th-century Roman Catholic bishop

Most Reverend Girolamo Codebò
- Bishop of Reggio Emilia
- Church: Catholic Church
- Diocese: Diocese of Reggio Emilia
- In office: 1661
- Predecessor: Rinaldo d'Este
- Successor: Giovanni Agostino Marliani
- Previous post: Bishop of Montalto delle Marche (1645–1661)

Orders
- Consecration: 26 Mar 1645 by Giovanni Battista Maria Pallotta

Personal details
- Died: 3 October 1661

Girolamo Codebò (died 1661) was a Roman Catholic prelate who served as Bishop of Reggio Emilia (1661) and Bishop of Montalto delle Marche (1645–1661).

== Biography ==
On 6 Feb 1645, Girolamo Codebò was appointed by Pope Innocent X as Bishop of Montalto delle Marche. On 26 Mar 1645, he was consecrated bishop by Giovanni Battista Maria Pallotta, Cardinal-Priest of San Silvestro in Capite, with Alfonso Sacrati, Bishop Emeritus of Comacchio, and Ranuccio Scotti Douglas, Bishop of Borgo San Donnino, serving as co-consecrators. On 24 Jan 1661, he was transferred by Pope Alexander VII to the diocese of Reggio Emilia.

He served as Bishop of Reggio Emilia until his death on 3 Oct 1661.

While bishop, he was the principal co-consecrator of Francesco Antonio De Luca, Bishop of Anglona-Tursi (1654).

== External links and additional sources ==
- Cheney, David M. "Diocese of Montalto (delle Marche)". Catholic-Hierarchy.org. (for Chronology of Bishops) ^{[self-published]}
- Chow, Gabriel. "Diocese of Montalto (Italy)". GCatholic.org. (for Chronology of Bishops) ^{[self-published]}
- Cheney, David M. "Diocese of Reggio Emilia-Guastalla". Catholic-Hierarchy.org. (for Chronology of Bishops) ^{[self-published]}
- Chow, Gabriel. "Diocese of Reggio Emilia-Guastalla (Italy)". GCatholic.org. (for Chronology of Bishops) ^{[self-published]}

Catholic Church titles
Preceded by Orazio Giustiniani	Bishop of Montalto delle Marche; 1645–1661	Succeeded by Cesare Cancellotti
Preceded by Rinaldo d'Este	Bishop of Reggio Emilia; 1661	Succeeded by Giovanni Agostino Marliani
