= Roman Catholic Diocese of Montalto =

Former Latin Catholic diocese in Italy

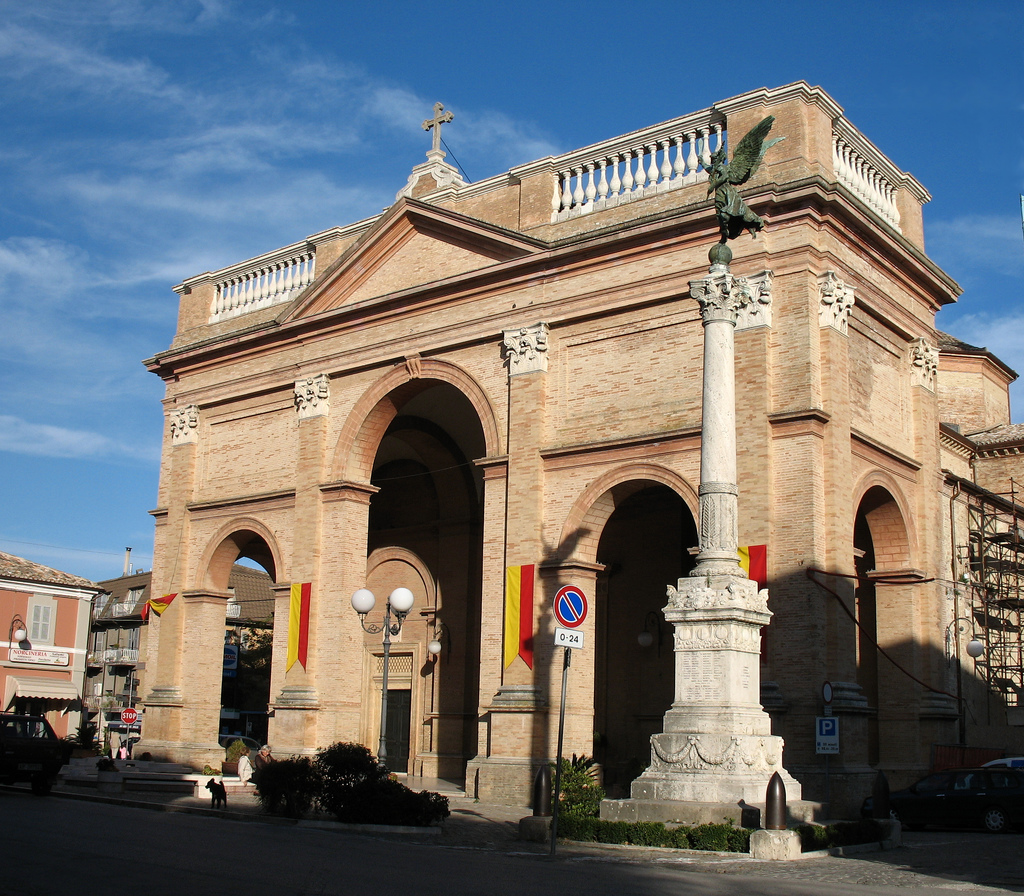
The cathedral of Montalto, dedicated to the Virgin Mary

The Diocese of Montalto (Latin: Dioecesis Montis Alti) was a Latin Church ecclesiastical territory or diocese of the Catholic Church located in the town of Montalto delle Marche in the Province of Ascoli Piceno in the Italian region of Marche. The diocese was erected in 1586 by Pope Sixtus V (Felice Peretti di Montalto), a native of the town. The diocese was suppressed in 1986, and its territory was assigned to a new entity, called the Diocese of San Benedetto del Tronto–Ripatransone–Montalto.

== Ecclesiastical history ==
On 24 November 1586, the Diocese of Montalto was established from territory split from the Diocese of Fermo.

In a papal bull of 18 December 1924, Pope Pius XI united the Diocese of Ripatransone with the diocese of Montalto ad personam episcopi. He appointed Luigi Ferri as Bishop of Ripatransone with Montalto, and ordered a change in the title of the bishop to Episcopus Montis alti et Ripanus. In 1980, the diocese of Montalto had a population of only 31,500 persons.

=== Restructuring ===
The Second Vatican Council (1962–1965), in order to ensure that all Catholics received proper spiritual attention, decreed the reorganization of the diocesan structure of Italy and the consolidation of small and struggling dioceses. It also recommended the abolition of anomalous units such as exempt territorial prelatures. These considerations applied to Montalto and to Ripatransone as the population migrated in the post-war period to jobs on the coast at San Benedetto.

On 18 February 1984, the Vatican and the Italian State signed a new and revised concordat. Based on the revisions, a set of Normae was issued on 15 November 1984, which was accompanied in the next year, on 3 June 1985, by enabling legislation. According to the agreement, the practice of having one bishop govern two separate dioceses at the same time, aeque personaliter, was abolished. Instead, the Vatican continued consultations which had begun under Pope John XXIII for the merging of small dioceses, especially those with personnel and financial problems, into one combined diocese. On 30 September 1986, Pope John Paul II ordered that the dioceses of Ripatransone and Montalto be merged into one diocese with one bishop, with the Latin title Dioecesis Sancti Benedicti ad Truentum-Ripana-Montis Alti. The seat of the diocese was to be in San Benedetto del Tronto, and the church of S. Maria della Marina was to serve as the cathedral of the merged dioceses. The cathedrals in Ripatransone and Montalto were to become co-cathedrals, and the cathedral Chapters were each to be a Capitulum Concathedralis. There was to be only one diocesan Tribunal, in San Benedetto del Tronto, and likewise one seminary, one College of Consultors, and one Priests' Council. The territory of the new diocese was to include the territory of the former dioceses of Montalto and Ripatransone.

The town is the site of the cathedral of Montalto delle Marche, dedicated to the taking up of the body of the Virgin Mary into heaven (Assumption).

== Bishops of Montalto ==
- Paolo Emilio Giovannini (1586–1606)
- Tiberio Mandosi (1606–1607)
- Paolo Orsini, O.P. (1608–1640)
- Orazio Giustiniani, C.O. (1640–1645)
- Girolamo Codebò (1645–1661)
- Cesare Cancellotti, C.O. (1662–1673)
- Ascanio Paganelli (1673–1710)
- Lucantonio Accoramboni (1711–1735)
- Pietro Bonaventura Savini (1735–1748 retired)
- Leonardo Cecconi (1748–1760)
- Giuseppe Maria Centini (1760–1770)
- Francesco Antonio Marucci (1770–1798)
- Francesco Saverio Castiglioni (1800–1816)
- Pietro Paolo Mazzichi (1817–1823)
- Filippo Ambrosi (1823–1825)
- Luigi Canestrari, O.M. (1825-1846)
- Eleonoro Aronne (1846–1887)
- Luigi Bonetti (1887–1911)
- Luigi Ferri (1911–1946)
- Pietro Ossola (1946–1951)
- Vincenzo Radicioni (1951–1983)
- Giuseppe Chiaretti (1983–1986)

== See also ==
- Catholic Church in Italy

== Books ==
- Gams, Pius Bonifatius (1873). Series episcoporum Ecclesiae catholicae: quotquot innotuerunt a beato Petro apostolo. Ratisbon: Typis et Sumptibus Georgii Josephi Manz. pp. 704–705.
- Gulik, Guilelmus (1923). Eubel, Conradus (ed.). Hierarchia catholica (in Latin). Vol. Tomus III (second ed.). Münster: Libreria Regensbergiana.
- Gauchat, Patritius (Patrice) (1935). Hierarchia catholica (in Latin). Vol. Tomus IV (1592-1667). Münster: Libraria Regensbergiana.
- Ritzler, Remigius; Sefrin, Pirminus (1952). Hierarchia catholica medii et recentis aevi (in Latin). Vol. Tomus V (1667-1730). Patavii: Messagero di S. Antonio.
- Ritzler, Remigius; Sefrin, Pirminus (1958). Hierarchia catholica medii et recentis aevi. Vol. Tomus VI (1730-1799). Patavii: Messagero di S. Antonio.
- Ritzler, Remigius; Sefrin, Pirminus (1968). Hierarchia Catholica medii et recentioris aevi (in Latin). Vol. VII (1800–1846). Monasterii: Libreria Regensburgiana.
- Remigius Ritzler; Pirminus Sefrin (1978). Hierarchia catholica Medii et recentioris aevi (in Latin). Vol. VIII (1846–1903). Il Messaggero di S. Antonio.
- Pięta, Zenon (2002). Hierarchia catholica medii et recentioris aevi (in Latin). Vol. IX (1903–1922). Padua: Messagero di San Antonio. ISBN 978-88-250-1000-8.

=== Studies ===
- Cappelletti, Giuseppe (1845). Le chiese d'Italia (in Italian). Vol. terzo (3). Venezia: Antonelli. pp. 721–727.
- Colucci, Giuseppe (1795). Delle Antichitá Picene. Delle antichitá del Medio, e Dell' infimo Evo, 9 (in Italian). Vol. Tomo XXIV. Fermo: Paccaroni.
- Ughelli, Ferdinando; Coleti, Niccolo (1717). Italia sacra; sive, De episcopis Italiæ (in Latin). Vol. Tomus secundus (secunda ed.). Venice: Apud Sebastianum Coleti. pp. 747–754.
