= Lucien Bonaparte (archdeacon) =

Archdeacon of Ajaccio and granduncle of Napoleon (1718–1791)

- Archdeacon of Ajaccio
- Church: Catholic Church
- Diocese: Ajaccio
- In office: 1771 – 1791

Personal details
- Born: 9 January 1718 Ajaccio, Corsica
- Died: 15 October 1791 (aged 73) Ajaccio, Corsica
- Denomination: Catholicism
- Parents: Sebastiano Nicola Buonaparte; Maria Anna Tusoli

Lucien Bonaparte (also known as Luciano Buonaparte, (Note: Alternatively spelt Lucciano) 1718 – 1791) was a Corsican archdeacon and member of the Buonaparte (Bonaparte) family who served as archdeacon of Ajaccio from 1771 until his death in 1791, and was granduncle of Napoleon and his siblings.

== Background ==
Lucien Bonaparte was born 9 January 1718, in Ajaccio, Corsica, then a part of the Republic of Genoa. His brother was Giuseppe Maria Buonaparte, a Corsican politician who served as Delegate for Ajaccio. Their father, Sebastiano, came from a long line of Corsican and Italian noblemen originating from Sarzana, San Miniato, and Florence, although it was not until 1771 that their nobility was recognized in Corsica. His brother was the father of Carlo Buonaparte, a noted attorney and politician who is chiefly remembered as the father of Napoleon. Although the Buonaparte family did not own vast amounts of wealth, they still owned large amounts of land, with Lucien claiming that they never had to buy their wine, bread or olive oil.

== Benefactor of the Bonaparte family ==
=== Clerical career ===
After the death of his brother Giuseppe Maria, Lucien became the guardian of his nephew Carlo. Lucien altered church records to record a nuptial mass as having occurred when Carlo was married to Letizia Ramolino in 1764. He strongly discouraged Carlo from following Pasquale Paoli into exile. In 1771, Lucien was created archdeacon of Ajaccio, and as archdeacon, Lucien maintained strong connections with the other members of the Bonaparte family.

=== Guardianship of Napoleon ===
After Carlo Buonaparte's death in 1785, Napoleon, then commonly referred to as Napoleone, wrote a letter to his grand uncle from the Paris Military School:

My dear Uncle,

It would be useless to tell you how affected I have been by the tragedy that has befallen us. We have lost in him a father, and God knows what a father he was, what is tenderness and love for us! Alas! In everything he was the protector of our youth. You have lost in him an obedient and grateful nephew. You know better than I how much he loved you. I will even dare to say that through his death our country has lost an enlightened and disinterested citizen.... and yet heaven lets him die, and where? A hundred leagues from home, in a strange country, far from all he held most dear... But the supreme Being has not allowed it to be so. His will is immutable. He alone can console us. Alas! Though he has taken from us what we held most dear, he has at least left those who alone can replace him. Agree, then, to be for us as the father we have lost. Our affection and gratitude will be equal to so great a service. I end by wishing that your health may be like my own.

Your very humble and obedient servant and nephew,

Napoleone di Buonaparte

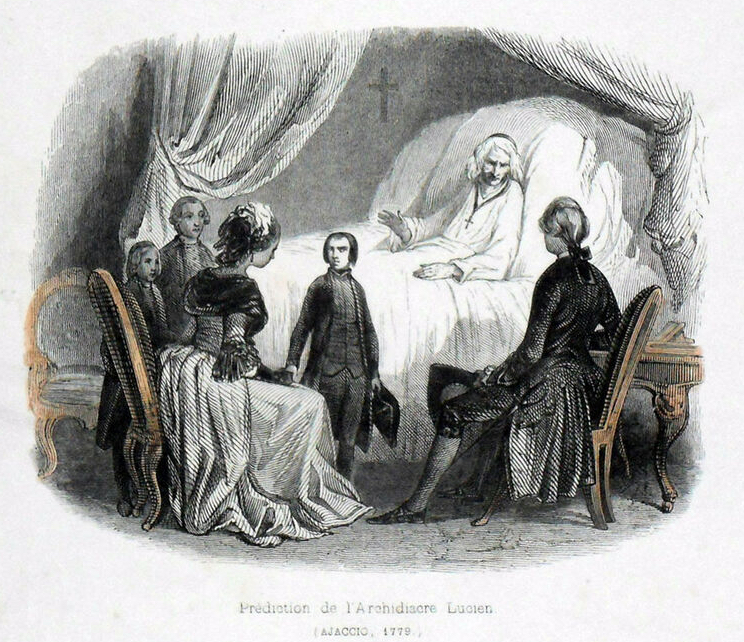
Prediction of Archdeacon Lucien Bonaparte in 1779, by Auguste Raffet (1839)

In the absence of Carlo, Lucien became the chief benefactor of the remaining Bonaparte family, residing with them at their ancestral home of the Casa Buonaparte. Ridden with gout, Lucien was confined to his bed, where he often kept his money he won from court cases.

Lucien would die on 15 October, 1791, in his birthplace of Ajaccio. On his deathbed, he is said to have stated to his family, gathered around his bed, "You, Joseph, will be head of the family, and you, Napoleon, will be a man." After his death, the Bonaparte family inherited his estate, slightly assisting them with their financial troubles. During Napoleon's later years, he would continue to remember his granduncle, sometimes fondly recalling his memories of him, and even remembering him as a second father.
