= Carlo Fabrizio Giustiniani =

Italian Roman Catholic prelate

Most Reverend Carlo Fabrizio Giustiniani
- Bishop of Accia and Mariana
- Church: Catholic Church
- Diocese: Diocese of Accia and Mariana
- In office: 1656–1682
- Predecessor: Giovanni Agostino Marliani
- Successor: Agostino Fieschi

Orders
- Ordination: 20 December 1648
- Consecration: 16 January 1656 by Giulio Cesare Sacchetti

Personal details
- Born: 12 December 1621 Genoa, Italy
- Died: 1 September 1682 (age 60)

Carlo Fabrizio Giustiniani (12 December 1621 – 1 September 1682) was a Roman Catholic prelate who served as Bishop of Accia and Mariana (1656–1682).

== Biography ==
Carlo Fabrizio Giustiniani was born in Genoa, Italy on 12 December 1621 and ordained a priest on 20 December 1648. On 10 January 1656, he was appointed during the papacy of Pope Alexander VII as Bishop of Accia and Mariana. On 16 January 1656, he was consecrated bishop by Giulio Cesare Sacchetti, Cardinal-Bishop of Frascati, with Ascanio Piccolomini, Archbishop of Siena, and Giovanni Agostino Marliani, Bishop Emeritus of Accia and Mariana, serving as co-consecrators. In 1676, he began construction of Notre-Dame-des-Grâces-de-Lavasina church, dedicated to the Virgin Mary, on the site where two miracles had occurred. He served as Bishop of Accia and Mariana until his death on 1 September 1682.

While bishop, he was the principal co-consecrator of Adamo Gentile, Bishop of Lipari (1660).

Catholic Church titles
Preceded by Giovanni Agostino Marliani	Bishop of Accia and Mariana; 1656–1682	Succeeded by Agostino Fieschi
