= Lucciana =

- Commune
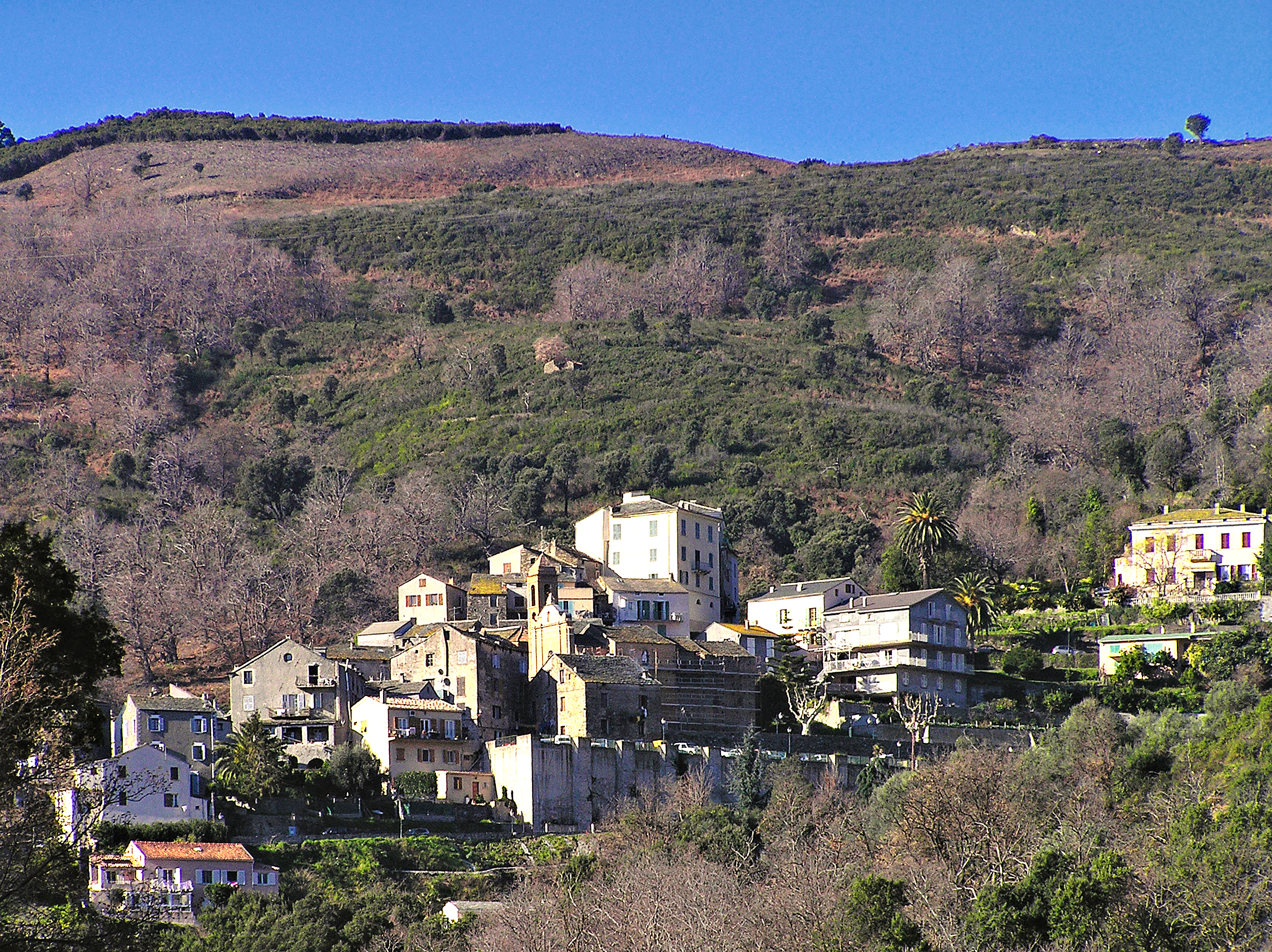
- A view of Lucciana village
- Location of Lucciana
- Location within France Location within Corsica
- Coordinates: 42°32′46″N 9°25′05″E
- Country: France
- Region: Corsica
- Department: Haute-Corse
- Arrondissement: Bastia
- Canton: Borgo

Government
  - Mayor (2020–2026): Joseph Galletti
- Area^{1}: 29.16 km^{2} (11.26 sq mi)
- Elevation: 250 m (820 ft)
- Highest elevation: 687 m (2,254 ft)
- Lowest elevation: 0 m (0 ft)
- Population (2023): 6,923
  - Density: 237.4/km^{2} (614.9/sq mi)
- Demonym(s): Luccianais, Luccianaise (French) luccianese (Italian) luccianincu, luccianinca (Corsican)
- Time zone: UTC+01:00 (CET)
  - Summer (DST): UTC+02:00 (CEST)
- INSEE/Postal code: 2B148 /20290
- ^{1} French Land Register data, which excludes lakes, ponds, glaciers > 1 km^{2} (0.386 sq mi or 247 acres) and river estuaries.

Lucciana (Corsican pronunciation: [lutˈtʃana], Italian: [lutˈtʃaːna], French: [lutʃ(j)ana]) is a French commune in the department of Upper Corsica, collectivity and island of Corsica.

== Geography ==
Situated on the eastern coast of Corsica nearly 20 km (12 mi) to the south of Bastia, the commune extends itself to the mountainous summit as far as the twisted lagoon of La Marana bordering the Tyrrhenian Sea.

The international airport of Bastia - Poretta is situated in the commune.

== History ==
The Roman town of Mariana had been founded by Gaius Marius in 93 BC. It was the seat of the Roman Catholic diocese of Mariana, associated with the dioceses of Pisa and Genoa, which lasted until it was transferred, along with all Corsican bishoprics, by the Concordat of 1801 to the Diocese of Ajaccio. The former cathedral, generally known as the church of La Canonica, is a notable Romanesque building of the 12th century.

== Economy ==
- A static inverter plant of HVDC SACOI located in the commune connects the power grids of Corsica and Sardinia with the grid of the Italian mainland.

== Population ==
Historical population
Year	Pop.	±% p.a.
1968	1,653	—
1975	2,507	+6.13%
1982	2,692	+1.02%
1990	3,217	+2.25%
1999	3,794	+1.85%
2007	4,010	+0.69%
2012	4,883	+4.02%
2017	5,780	+3.43%
2023	6,923	+3.05%
Source: INSEE

== Sights ==
- The Cathedral of the Canonica. Romanesque architecture from the 11th century. Renovated and dedicated to the Assumption of Mary. The cathedral features a statue of the Corsican patron saint Devota and a bronze figure of Christ by MC Sei Dominici.
- The archeological site of Mariana - excavations open to the public.
- It has been used as a special stage in the Tour de Corse.

== International relations ==
Lucciana is twinned with:

- Monaco, Monaco (2009)

== See also ==
- Communes of the Haute-Corse department
- Railway stations in Corsica
