= Agostino Fieschi (bishop of Accia and Mariana) =

Italian Roman Catholic prelate

Most Reverend Agostino Fieschi
- Bishop of Accia and Mariana
- Church: Catholic Church
- Diocese: Diocese of Accia and Mariana
- In office: 1683–1685
- Predecessor: Carlo Fabrizio Giustiniani
- Successor: Jean Charles de Mari

Orders
- Consecration: 20 June 1683 by Alessandro Crescenzi (cardinal)

Personal details
- Born: 1643 Genoa, Italy
- Died: 28 May 1685 (age 42) France

Agostino Fieschi, C.R. (1643 – 28 May, 1685) was a Roman Catholic prelate who served as Bishop of Accia and Mariana (1683–1685).

== Biography ==
Agostino Fieschi was born in Genoa, Italy in 1643 and ordained a priest in the Congregation of Clerics Regular of the Divine Providence. On 14 June 1683, he was appointed during the papacy of Pope Innocent XI as Bishop of Accia and Mariana. On 20 June 1683, he was consecrated bishop by Alessandro Crescenzi (cardinal), Cardinal-Priest of Santa Prisca, with Pier Antonio Capobianco, Bishop Emeritus of Lacedonia, and Francesco Maria Giannotti, Bishop of Segni, serving as co-consecrators. He served as Bishop of Accia and Mariana until his death on 28 May 1685.

Catholic Church titles
Preceded by Carlo Fabrizio Giustiniani	Bishop of Accia and Mariana; 1683–1685	Succeeded by Jean Charles de Mari
