= Caporale =

Caporale is a surname. Notable people with the surname:

- Corky Caporale, Sopranos character played by Edoardo Ballerini
- D. Nick Caporale (born 1928), justice of the Nebraska Supreme Court
- Geraldo Scarpone Caporale (1928–2016), Honduran Roman Catholic bishop
- Justin Caporale, Director of Operation, Event Strategies, Inc.
- Mariano Caporale (born 1985), Argentine football player

== See also ==
- Caporales, traditional dance in Bolivia
