= Bastia Cathedral =

Cathedral in Haute-Corse, France

Coordinates: 42°41′32″N 9°27′6″E

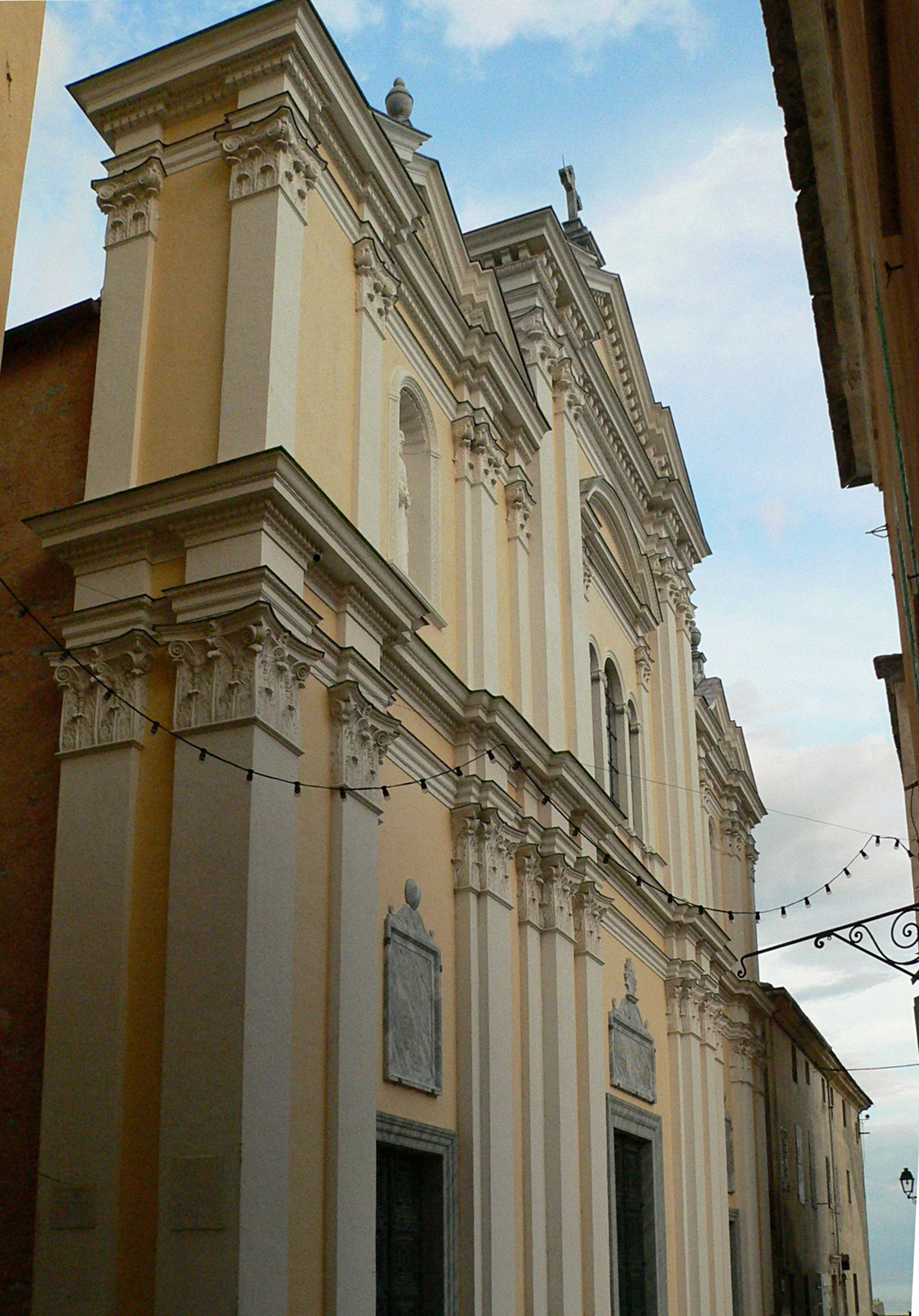
Former Bastia Cathedral

Bastia Cathedral, now the parish church of Sainte-Marie (French: Pro-cathédrale Sainte-Marie de l'Assomption de Bastia; Église Sainte-Marie) is a Roman Catholic church and former cathedral in Bastia on the island of Corsica. It has been listed since 2000 as a monument historique by the French Ministry of Culture.

Bastia Cathedral, dedicated to the Assumption of the Virgin Mary, was built from 1495 onwards, with major reconstruction at the beginning of the 17th century. Between 1570 and 1801 it was the pro-cathedral of the Diocese of Mariana and Accia, which in 1801 was absorbed into the Diocese of Ajaccio. Behind the church stands the chapel of Sainte-Croix, known for its exuberantly decorated interior and for the figure of Christ des Miracles ("Christ of the Miracles"), venerated by the people of Bastia, and discovered floating in the waters of the Mediterranean in 1428 by two fishermen.
