= Maona =

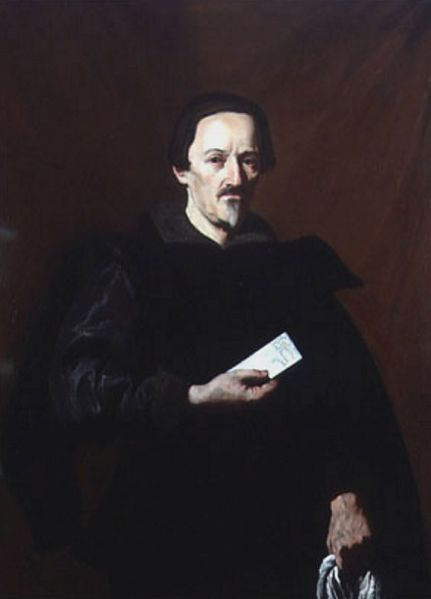
Vincenzo Giustiniani was the last owner of the Genoese Maona of Chios

A maona (Arabic: معونة ma‘ūnah; lit. 'help'; Arabic: معاونة mu‘āwanah; lit. 'mutual help') also as mahona (pl. mahone) or societas comperarum was a medieval Italian association of investors formed to manage the purchased shares (loca or partes) of the revenue due to the relevant city-state through tax farming. The shares were individually sold to wealthy merchants who would band together to make collection easier.

== Characteristics ==
These organizations were usually temporary, and could sometimes be extremely aggressive in extracting the monies due them, engaging in activities up to and including outright conquest. The origins of the concept can be traced back to trade financing in Mesopotamia. The linguistic roots of the Arabic word maona (معونة) can be best translated as 'help' or 'helping each other'. The maonas were the first examples of shareholding companies in the Western world and were used by the Genoese to enlarge their dominions in the Levant in the 14th century. Maona were especially common in Genoa and the territories of the Republic of Genoa.

== Maona of Chios and Phocaea ==
The most notable maona was the one administering the island of Chios in the Aegean Sea and the nearby port of Phocaea, formed in 1346. It was sold to the Giustiniani family of settlers on Chios, who then ruled the island until the Ottoman conquest in 1566.

The model proved successful, and in 1373 the Genoese also founded the Maona Vecchia di Cipro in Cyprus.
