= Diocese of Accia =

Roman Catholic titular see

Coordinates: 42.42115°N 9.331725°E

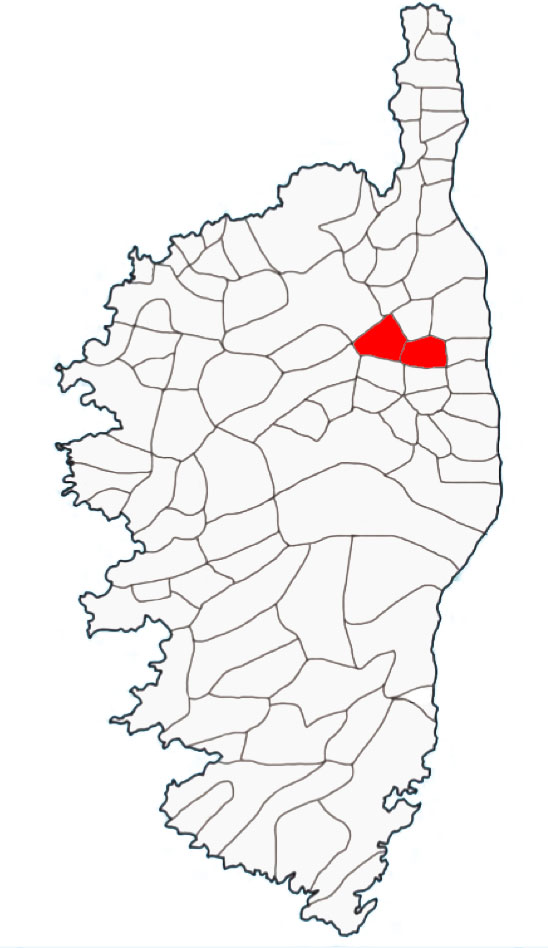
Location of Accia in Corsica

The Diocese of Accia was a Roman Catholic bishopric on the island of Corsica. It is now a titular diocese. The diocese was located in the town of Accia in the interior region of Haute-Corse, which was destroyed and from which only some ruins remain. Established in 824 AD it was merged with the Diocese of Mariana in 1554. In 1570 the Bishop of Mariana and Accia moved his seat to Bastia.

In 1968, the Diocese of Accia was revived as a titular See, and with one brief exception, has been used as a title for Auxiliary Bishops of various dioceses.

== Bishops ==
=== Bishops of Accia ===
- Nicolaus (909)
- Riccobonus (930)
- Henricus (Enrico o Arrigo) (1133)
- Opizo (1237)
- Imerius Guardalupo, O.E.S.A. (ca. 1267 – 1272)
- Benvenuto Nonno, O.Cist. (ca. 1297 – 1332)
- Angelo, O.Min. (20 Sep 1332 – 1344)
- Nicolaus (28 May 1344 – 1348)
- Francesco de Quesso, O.Min. (11 Feb 1348 – ? )
- Raimondo de Piacenza, O.Min. (13 May 1377 – ? )
- Francesco Bonaccorsi, O.Min. (13 Oct 1400 – 1421?)
- Ludovico di Narni, O.F.M. (26 March 1401 – ? )
- Agnello di Napoli, O.Carm. (30 May 1421 – 1440? )
- Alberto de Casini, O.F.M. (6 Feb 1441 – 8 Sept 1450)
- Antonio d'Omessa, O.P. (17 March 1451 – ? )
- Giovanni Andrea Bussi (3 March 1463 – 23 July 1466)
- Antonio de Bonaumbra (4 May 1467 – ? )
- Bartolomeo Panmoglio (Pammoleo) (14 April 1480 – ? )
- Girolamo Antonio di Subiaco (21 Feb 1494 - ? )
- Domenico de Valletari (21 Aug 1500 - 1521)
- Bernardino de Luca (16 Oct 1521 - ? )
- Benedetto de Nobili (1536 - 1545)
- Girolamo Boccadoro (26 Aug 1545 – ? )
- Pietro Affatato (14 Feb 1547 – 3 July 1553)
- Agostino Salvago, O.P. (18 Aug 1553 – 28 Nov 1558)
- Giulio Superchio, O.Carm. † (14 Feb 1560 – 30 January 1563)

=== Diocese of Mariana and Accia ===
- Nicolo Cicala (1563–1570)
- Giovanni Battista Centurioni (4 September 1570 – 1584)
- Nicolaus Mascardi (9 April 1584 – 1599)
- Hieronymus de Puteo (dal Pozzo) (29 November 1599 – 11 July 1622)
- Iulius de Puteo (dal Pozzo)
- Giovanni Agostino Marliani
- Carlo Fabrizio Giustiniani (10 January 1656 – 1 September 1682)
- Agostino Fieschi, O.Theat. (14 June 1683 – 28 May 1685)
- Giovanni Carlo de Mari
- Mario Emmanuele Durazzo (1704–1707)
- Andrea dalla Rocca (28 November 1707 – March 1720)
- Andrea Saluzzo (3 July 1720 – 1747)
- Domenico Saporiti (31 July 1747 – April 1772)
- Angelo Edoardo Stefanini (7 September 1772 – 29 January 1775)
- Francesco Citadella (29 May 1775 – 1781
- Pierre Pineau Duverdier, Orat. (25 February 1782 – December 1788)
- Ignace François Verclos (30 March 1789 – May 1801)

== See also ==
- Catholic Church in France
- List of Catholic dioceses in France

== Books ==
- Cappelletti, Giuseppe (1861). Le chiese d'Italia Tomo decimosesto Venezia: Giuseppe Antonelli. Retrieved: 2016-10-26.
- Eubel, Conradus, ed. (1913). Hierarchia catholica, Tomus 1 (second ed.). Münster: Libreria Regensbergiana. (in Latin)
- Eubel, Conradus, ed. (1914). Hierarchia catholica, Tomus 2 (second ed.). Münster: Libreria Regensbergiana.
- Gulik, Guilelmus (1923). Eubel, Conradus (ed.). Hierarchia catholica, Tomus 3 (second ed.). Münster: Libreria Regensbergiana.
- Gams, Pius Bonifatius (1873). Series episcoporum Ecclesiae catholicae: quotquot innotuerunt a beato Petro apostolo (in Latin). Ratisbon: Typis et Sumptibus Georgii Josephi Manz.
- Gauchat, Patritius (Patrice) (1935). Hierarchia catholica IV (1592–1667). Münster: Libraria Regensbergiana.
- Pergola, Ph., "Mariana", in Topographie chrétienne des cités de la Gaule des origines au milieu du Ville siècle, II, Paris 1986, pp. 99–103.
- Ritzler, Remigius; Sefrin, Pirminus (1952). Hierarchia catholica medii et recentis aevi V (1667–1730). Patavii: Messagero di S. Antonio.
- Ritzler, Remigius; Sefrin, Pirminus (1958). Hierarchia catholica medii et recentis aevi VI (1730–1799). Patavii: Messagero di S. Antonio.
- Ughelli, Ferdinando; Coleti, Niccolò (1719). Italia sacra sive De episcopis Italiæ, et insularum adjacentium (in Latin). Vol. Tomus quartus (4). Venice: apud Sebastianum Coleti. pp. 907–910.
- Venturini, A. (2006), "Les évêques de Corse depuis les origines avérées à la réunion de l'évêché d'Accia à celui de Mariana (591–1563)," Etudes corses no. 65 (Fevrier 2008), pp. 1–40. (in French)
