= Giovanni Agostino Marliani =

Most Reverend Giovanni Agostino Marliani
- Bishop of Reggio Emilia
- Church: Catholic Church
- Diocese: Diocese of Reggio Emilia
- In office: 1662–1674
- Predecessor: Girolamo Codebò
- Successor: Augusto Bellincini

Orders
- Consecration: 1645 by Stefano Durazzo

Personal details
- Born: 1585 Genoa, Italy
- Died: 4 June 1674 (age 89) Reggio Emilia, Italy

Giovanni Agostino Marliani (1585 – 4 June 1674) was a Roman Catholic prelate who served as Bishop of Reggio Emilia (1662–1674) and Bishop of Accia and Mariana (1645–1656).

== Biography ==
Giovanni Agostino Marliani was born of a patrician family in Genoa, Italy in 1585.

He is attested as Vicar General of the diocese of Genoa in 1635 and again in 1640.

On 15 July 1645, Marliani was appointed Bishop of Accia and Mariana by Pope Innocent X. In 1645, he was consecrated bishop by Stefano Durazzo, Archbishop of Genoa. In 1656, he resigned as Bishop of Accia and Mariana.

On 27 February 1662, he was appointed Bishop of Reggio Emilia by Pope Alexander VII. He held a diocesan synod in Reggio on 15–17 June 1665. He held a second synod on 17–19 April 1674.

Marliani served as Bishop of Reggio Emilia until his death on 4 June 1674.

== Episcopal succession ==
While bishop, he was the principal co-consecrator of:

- Carlo Fabrizio Giustiniani, Bishop of Accia and Mariana (1656);
- Matteo di Génnaro, Archbishop of Reggio Calabria (1660);
- Francesco Falabella, Archbishop of Santa Severina (1660);
- Francesco Angelucci, Bishop of Veroli (1660);
- Luigi de Gennaro, Bishop of Cava de' Tirreni (1660);
- Francesco Maria Annoni, Bishop of Muro Lucano (1660);
- Francesco de Marchi (bishop), Bishop of Krk (1660);
- Francesco Cini, Bishop of Macerata e Tolentino (1660);
- Giovanni Antonio Melzi, Archbishop of Capua (1661);
- Federico Martinotti, Bishop of Sarsina (1661); and
- Vitaliano Marescano, Bishop of Umbriatico (1661).

== External links and additional sources ==
- Saccani, Giovanni (1902). I vescovi di Reggio-Emilia, Cronotassi, Reggio Emilia: Tip. Artigianelli 1902, pp. 137-139. (in Italian)

Catholic Church titles
Preceded by Giulio del Pozzo	Bishop of Accia and Mariana; 1645–1656	Succeeded by Carlo Fabrizio Giustiniani
Preceded by Girolamo Codebò	Bishop of Reggio Emilia; 1662–1674	Succeeded by Augusto Bellincini
