= Diocese of Mariana in Corsica =

Former Catholic diocese on Corsica

The Diocese of Mariana in Corsica (Latin: Dioecesis Marianensis) was a Roman Catholic ecclesiastical territory in Mariana, Corsica, in the north-eastern corner of the island. In 1563 the diocese was united with the Diocese of Acci(a) to form the Diocese of Accia and Mariana. Both dioceses were poor and had lost population. Mariana had been abandoned and its bishop lived in Bastia to the north, the seat of the civil government of the island. The Cathedral sat alone near the banks of the River Golo some three miles from the sea, in the midst of fields.

== History ==
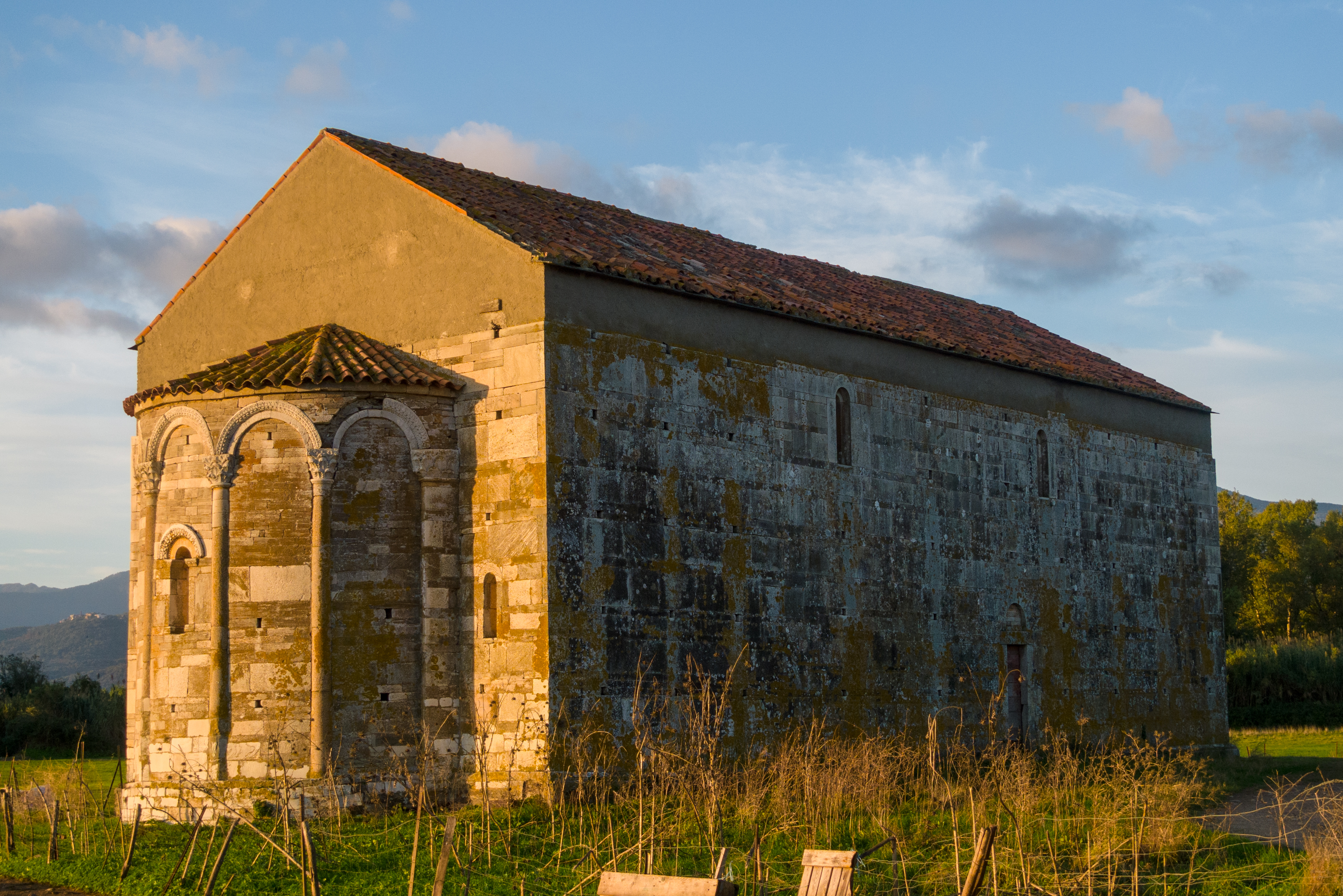
Church of S. Parteo, Lucciana (restored)

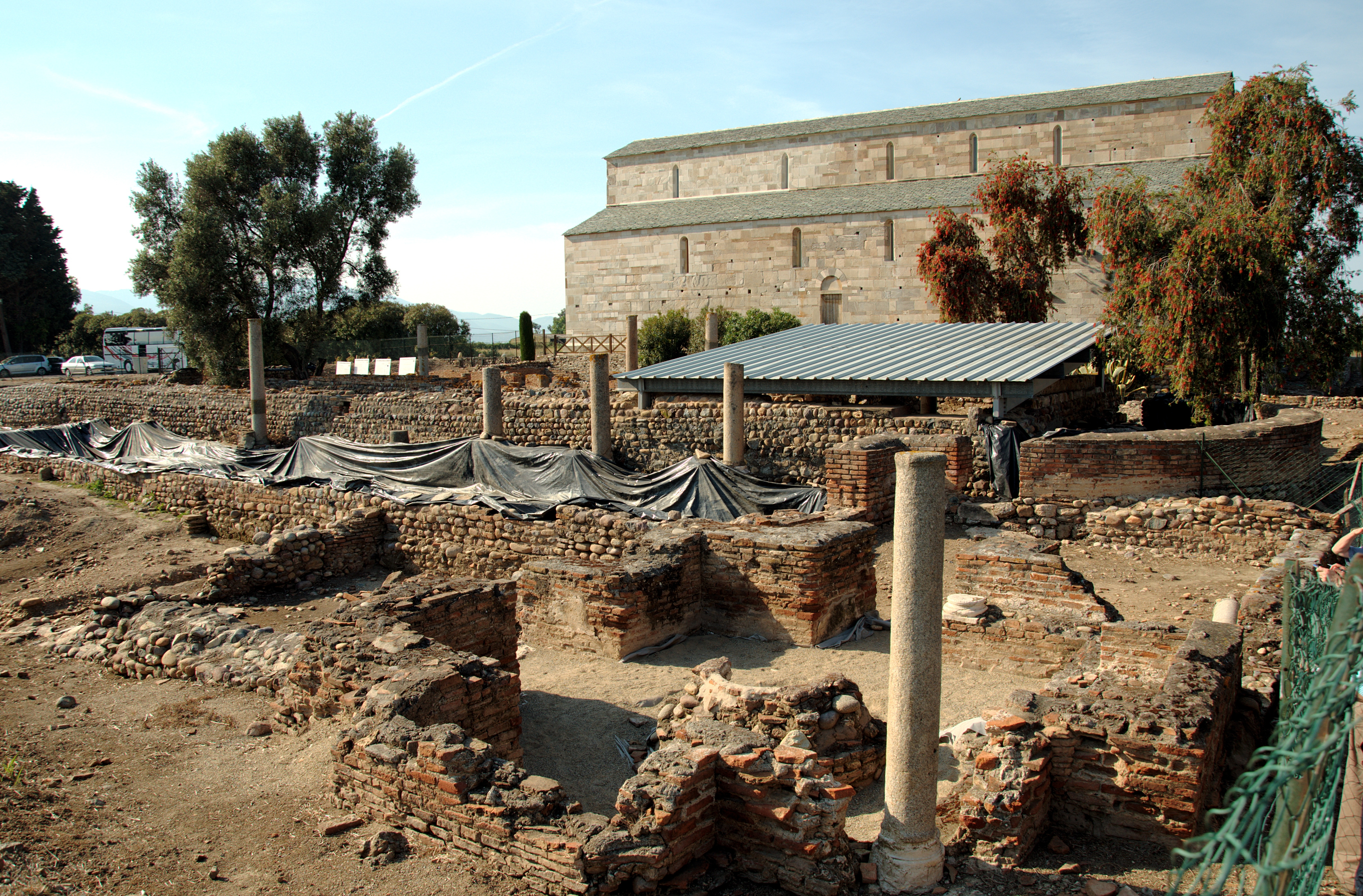
Cathedral of Mariana (restored)

In the earliest history of the diocese, Ferdinando Ughelli reports the existence of a Saint Petreius, Bishop of Mariana and martyr, for whom a shrine was built by a certain Ugo Colonna of Rome, according to the Sacra Corsicae Chronica of Salvatore Vitale. Giuseppe Cappelletti points out that Vitale is the only source of the story, but that Ugo Colonna built the cathedral, which was dedicated to the Assumption of the Virgin Mary, and that San Petreio was a different church. He also notes that the Martyrologies do not report the existence of a bishop, a bishop and martyr, or just a martyr named Perseo or Petreio. Pius Gams both italicizes the name Perseus and puts it in parentheses, indicating grave suspicion.

Ughelli then reports the existence of a Bishop Catanus, Corsicanus episcopus, who attended the Synod of Arles in 314. Neither the name nor the diocese of Mariana occurs, however, in the list of those who attended the Synod.

Ughelli thirdly reports the existence of Bishop Leo of Corsica, on the authority of letters of Pope Gregory I and the Sacra Corsicae Chronica of Salvatore Vitale. Bishop Leo did exist, but Pope Gregory addresses him as episcopus in Corsica, bishop in Corsica, not bishop of Corsica. Leo had been sent by the Pope as an Apostolic Visitor, since, as the Pope notes, the dioceses of Corsica had long been vacant.

The fourteenth century was a period of extreme crisis in Corsica. Roger Caratini notes that the population of ordinary people on the island had decreased by 8% between 1300 and 1350, mostly by migration to the territory of Pisa; then came the Black Death; between 1350 and 1400 the population decreased another 19%. The ability to maintain traditional institutions in the face of the new Genoese overlords was greatly compromised.

In 1453 Pope Nicholas V entered into a verbal agreement with the Republic of Genoa, which specified that, although the Pope maintained the exclusive right to appoint bishops on the Island of Corsica, he would appoint only Genoese subjects who were acceptable to the Government. The Genoese government turned the island over to the administration of the Genoese Banco di S. Giorgio, under new statutes for Corsica were issued, the Capitula Corsorum, which specified that bishops on the island had to be natives of the island. In 1464, however, the Republic of Genoa came under the domination of the Duchy of Milan, and it was the Milanese who decided appointments. In 1479 the Milanese were compelled to evacuate Corsica, and their regulations were nullified.

In 1563, considering the extreme poverty of the diocese of S. Pietro de Accia, which could no longer support a bishop, Pope Pius IV joined the diocese with the diocese of Mariana, with the new title of Bishop of Mariana and Accia.

During the French Revolution, the National Constituent Assembly reformed the Church in France, drawing up the Civil Constitution of the Clergy (12 July 1790). All clergy were obliged to swear an oath of allegiance to the Constitution, thereby effectively entering into a schism with the Papacy and the Roman Catholic Church. The number of bishoprics in France was dramatically reduced. The five bishoprics on the island of Corsica were suppressed and combined into one, to be called the diocèse de Corse.

When the electors of Corsica assembled, they elected Ignace-François Guasco, Provost (or Dean) of the Cathedral Chapter of Mariana as their 'Constitutional Bishop'. The canonical bishop Verclos made his protest and fled to the mainland of Italy. Guasco was consecrated at Aix on 16 June 1791 by Constitutional Bishop Charles-Benoît Roux, Metropolitan of Bouches-de-Rhône; the consecration was valid but illicit and schismatic. On 11 August 1793, judging that the territory of Corse was too large, the National Convention in the Constitution of 1793 divided both the department and the diocese of Corse into two, Golo (Guasco, resident at Ajaccio) and Liamone, and ordered a second bishop to be elected for the northern and eastern part of the island. Before this could be done, however, the British seized the island, and on 23 December 1793, Guasco recanted and resigned. Bishop Verclos immediately returned to Corsica.

In November 1801, the decision was taken by Pope Pius VII in implementing the Concordat of 1801 not to alter the situation in Corsica which had been imposed by the French Revolution. All of the dioceses remained suppressed, with the exception of Ajaccio, which had been the center of the 'Constitutional Bishop of Corse' and which was coincidentally the birthplace of the First Consul, Napoleon Bonaparte.

In April 2002 the title Bishop of Mariana in Corsica (though not the diocesan apparatus) was revived. It has been used to qualify a priest as an auxiliary bishop, and to reward a domestic prelate in the Papal Household. The titular see of Accia was separately revived in 1968.

== Bishops ==
=== Diocese of Mariana ===
...

- Donatus (attested 649)
- Lunergius (attested 900 or 909)
- Lotherius (attested ca. 940)

...

- Guilelmus (1123)
- Petrus (1158)
- Josephus (attested in 1179)
- Pandulfus (1242)
- Opizo Cortineo (ca. 1260)
- Adam (ca. 1320)
- Vincentius, O.Min. (1 December 1329 – ? )
- Benvenutus de Fabriano, O.Min. (9 June 1343 – ? )
- Dominicus de Campotaxio (ca. 1350)
- Raimundus, O.P. (10 June 1351 – 1352)
- Giovanni da Castello (7 January 1353 – 1364)
- Pietro Raimundi, O.Carm. (10 April 1364 – 1366)
- Nicolò Ligur (8 June 1366 – ? )
- Bonaventura (ca. 1380) (appointed by Urban VI of the Roman Obedience)
- Giovanni d'Omessa (11 February 1388 – 1428) (appointed by Urban VI of the Roman Obedience)
- Dominicus de Orbitello (19 April 1428 – 1434)
- Giorgio Fieschi (Flisco) (10 May 1434 – 3 Oct 1436) (Appointed Archbishop of Genoa)
- Michele de Germanis de Portu Mauritii (19 November 1436 – 1458)
- Girolamo de Montenigro, O.P. (21 July 1458 – 1464)
- Leonardo Fornari (11 January 1465 – 1494)
- Ottaviano Fornari (20 Jan 1495 - 1500 Died)
- Giovanni Battista Usumari (1500 – 1512)
- Giovanni Battista Cibo (1512 – 1531)
- Cardinal Innocenzo Cibo (Cybo), Administrator (20 Mar 1531 – 1 Dec 1531 Resigned)
- Cesare Cibo (1 December 1531 – 22 June 1548)
- Ottaviano Cibo (22 June 1548 – 1550)
- Balduino de Balduinis (17 Dec 1550 – 30 March 1554) (Appointed Bishop of Aversa)
- Cardinal Giovanni Battista Cicala (Cicada), Administrator. (30 Mar 1554 – 13 Sep 1560 Resigned)
- Nicolo Cicala (13 Sep 1560 - 1563)

=== Diocese of Mariana and Accia ===
- Giovanni Battista Centurioni (4 September 1570 – 1584)
- Nicolaus Mascardi (9 April 1584 – 1599)
- Hieronymus de Puteo (dal Pozzo) (29 November 1599 – 11 July 1622)
- Iulius de Puteo (dal Pozzo)
- Giovanni Agostino Marliani
- Carlo Fabrizio Giustiniani (10 January 1656 – 1 September 1682)
- Agostino Fieschi, O.Theat. (14 June 1683 – 28 May 1685)
- Giovanni Carlo de Mari
- Mario Emmanuele Durazzo (1704 – 1707)
- Andrea dalla Rocca (28 November 1707 – March 1720)
- Andrea Saluzzo (3 July 1720 – 1747)
- Domenico Saporiti (31 July 1747 – April 1772)
- Angelo Edoardo Stefanini (7 September 1772 – 29 January 1775)
- Francesco Citadella (29 May 1775 – 1781
- Pierre Pineau Duverdier, Orat. (25 February 1782 – December 1788)
- Ignace François Verclos (30 March 1789 – May 1801)

=== Titular Bishops of Mariana ===
- Giacomo Lanzetti (21 June 2002 – 29 September 2006)
- Paolo De Nicolò (24 May 2008 - )

== Books ==
- Cappelletti, Giuseppe (1861). Le chiese d'Italia Tomo decimosesto Venezia: Giuseppe Antonelli. Retrieved: 2016-10-26.
- Eubel, Conradus, ed. (1913). Hierarchia catholica, Tomus 1 (second ed.). Münster: Libreria Regensbergiana. (in Latin)
- Eubel, Conradus, ed. (1914). Hierarchia catholica, Tomus 2 (second ed.). Münster: Libreria Regensbergiana.
- Gulik, Guilelmus (1923). Eubel, Conradus (ed.). Hierarchia catholica, Tomus 3 (second ed.). Münster: Libreria Regensbergiana.
- Gams, Pius Bonifatius (1873). Series episcoporum Ecclesiae catholicae: quotquot innotuerunt a beato Petro apostolo (in Latin). Ratisbon: Typis et Sumptibus Georgii Josephi Manz.
- Gauchat, Patritius (Patrice) (1935). Hierarchia catholica IV (1592-1667). Münster: Libraria Regensbergiana.
- Pergola, Ph., "Mariana", in Topographie chrétienne des cités de la Gaule des origines au milieu du Ville siècle, II, Paris 1986, pp. 99–103.
- Pisani, Paul (1907). Répertoire biographique de l'épiscopat constitutionnel (1791-1802) (in French). Paris: A. Picard et fils.
- Ritzler, Remigius; Sefrin, Pirminus (1952). Hierarchia catholica medii et recentis aevi V (1667-1730). Patavii: Messagero di S. Antonio.
- Ritzler, Remigius; Sefrin, Pirminus (1958). Hierarchia catholica medii et recentis aevi VI (1730-1799). Patavii: Messagero di S. Antonio.
- Ughelli, Ferdinando; Coleti, Niccolò (1719). Italia sacra sive De episcopis Italiæ, et insularum adjacentium (in Latin). Vol. Tomus quartus (4). Venice: apud Sebastianum Coleti. pp. 999–1004.
- Venturini, A. (2006), "Les évêques de Corse depuis les origines avérées à la réunion de l'évêché d'Accia à celui de Mariana (591-1563)," Etudes corses no. 65 (Fevrier 2008), pp. 1–40. (in French)
