= Mariana, Corsica =

Roman site near Biguglia

Coordinates: 42°32′21″N 9°29′45″E

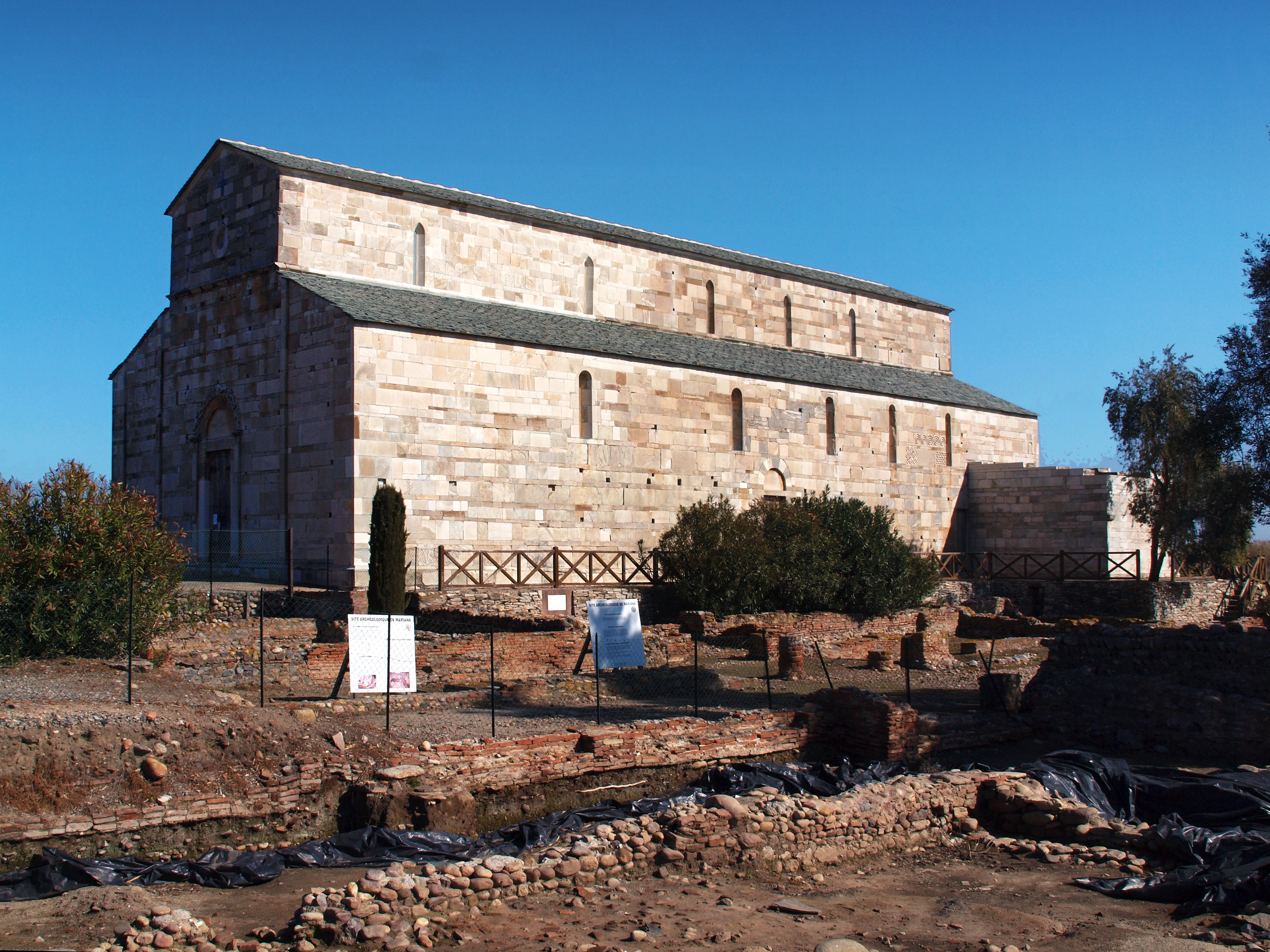
The Church of Santa Maria Assunta

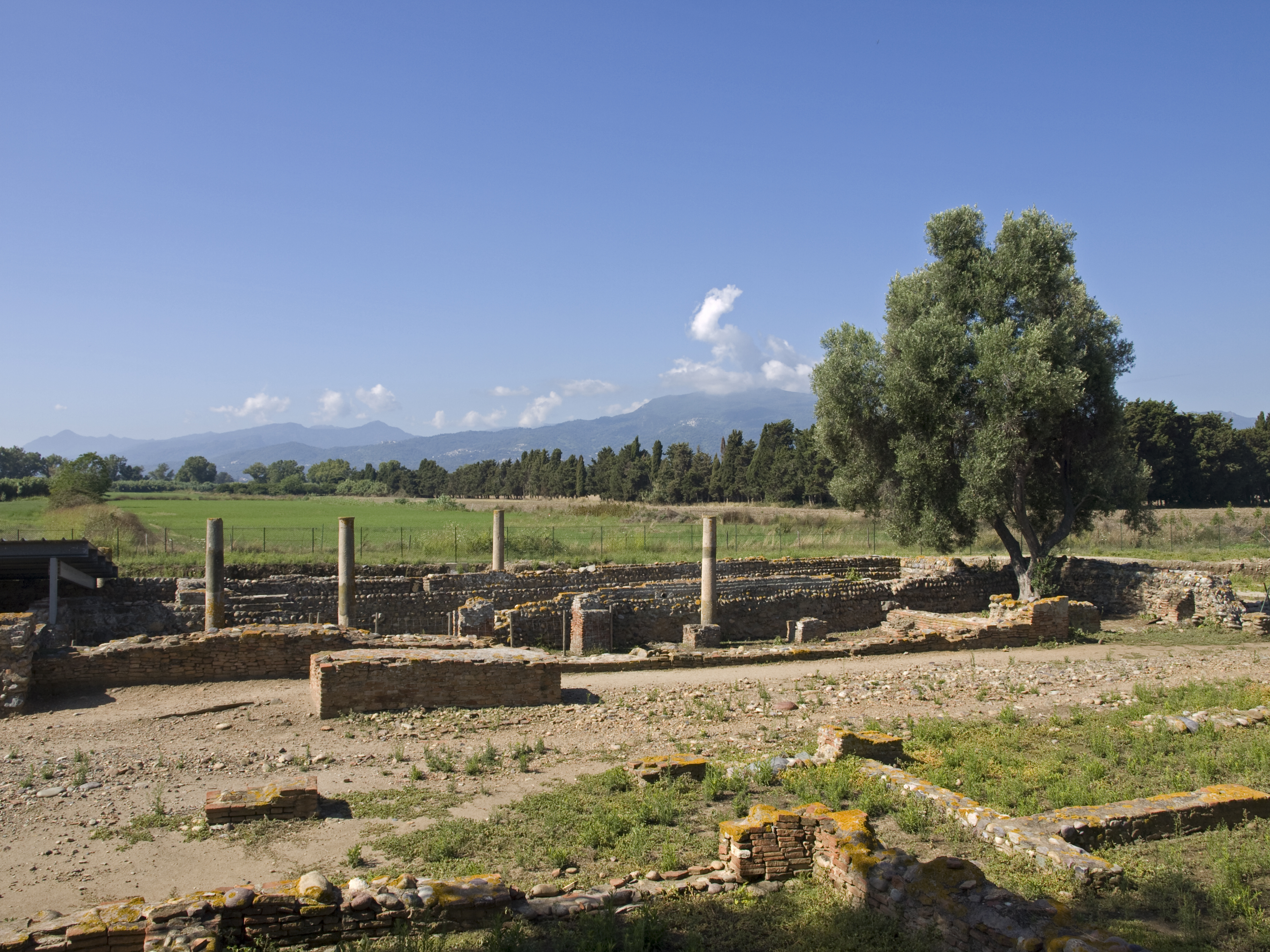
Roman ruins

Mariana is a Roman site south of Biguglia, in the Haute-Corse département of the Corsica région of south-east France. It lies in the littoral area known as La Marana, near the present town of Lucciana. There are two old churches in the area — the Church of Santa Maria Assunta and San Parteo Church.

== History ==
It was founded in 93 BC as a military colony. Saint Devota, patron saint of Corsica and Monaco, is said to have been martyred here in 303 AD.
