= Diocese of Ajaccio =

Latin Catholic diocese in France

Coordinates: 41°54′59″N 8°43′47″E

Diocese of Ajaccio Dioecesis Adiacensis Diocèse d'Ajaccio Diocesi d'Aiacciu

Catholic
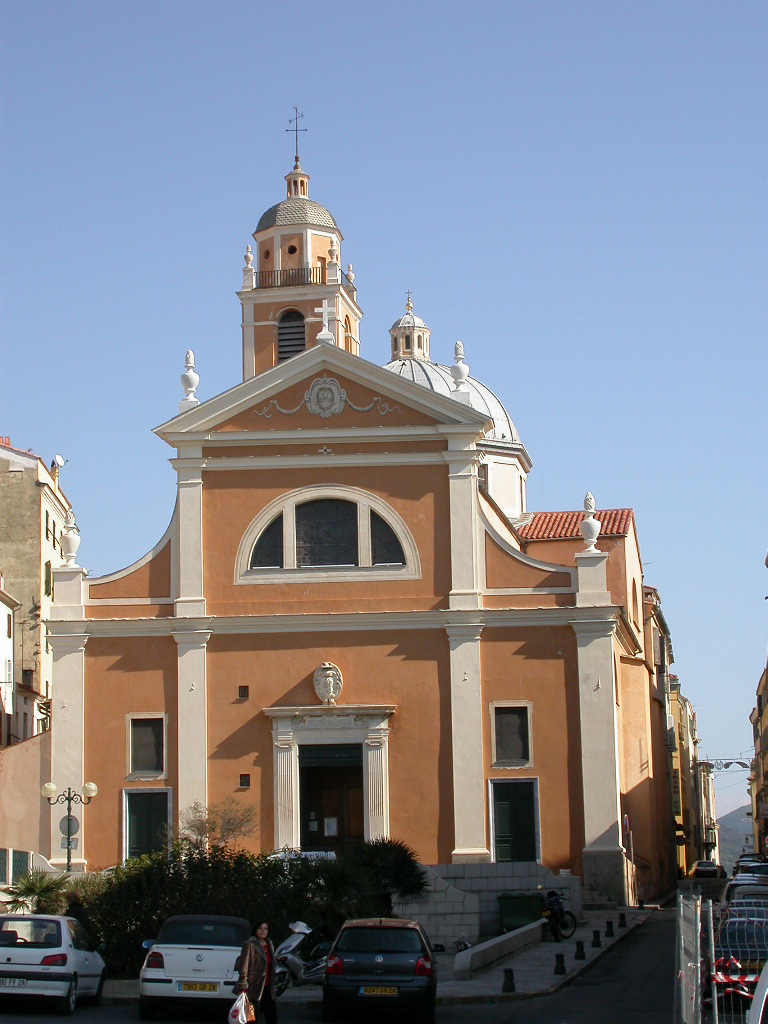
- Ajaccio Cathedral

Location
- Country: France
- Ecclesiastical province: Marseille
- Metropolitan: Archdiocese of Marseille

Statistics
- Area: 8,722 km^{2} (3,368 sq mi)
- Population: Total; Catholics: (as of 2022); 340,000; 277,000 (81.5%)
- Parishes: 434

Information
- Denomination: Catholic Church
- Sui iuris church: Latin Church
- Rite: Roman Rite
- Established: 3rd Century
- Cathedral: Cathedral of Our Lady of the Assumption of Ajaccio
- Patron saint: St. Euphrase
- Secular priests: 56 (Diocesan); 20 (Religious Orders); 13 Permanent Deacons

Current leadership
- Pope: Leo XIV
- Bishop: François-Xavier Bustillo, O.F.M. Conv.
- Metropolitan Archbishop: Jean-Marc Aveline

Map

Website
- Website of the Diocese

The Diocese of Ajaccio (Latin: Dioecesis Adiacensis; French: Diocèse d'Ajaccio) is a Latin Church ecclesiastical jurisdiction or diocese of the Catholic Church in France. The diocese comprises the whole of the island of Corsica.

Erected in the 3rd century, the diocese was formerly a suffragan of the Archdiocese of Pisa. After the French Concordat of 1801, the diocese became a suffragan of the Archdiocese of Aix-en-Provence and Arles, until 2002 when it was attached to the archdiocesan province of Marseille. In 2012, in the diocese of Ajaccio, there was one priest for every 3,636 Catholics.

== History ==
Its first bishop known to history was Evandrus, who assisted at the Council of Rome in 313.

In 1077, Pope Gregory VII granted the sovereignty of the island of Corsica to Pisa. In 1347, Pisa was forced to cede its control over the island of Corsica to Genoa. Pope Eugene IV tried to reestablish papal sovereignty, but he failed.

The Byzantine ruins at Mariana perpetuate the memory of the church built by the Pisans in the 12th century.

At the end of the sixteenth century, the Cathedral of Ajaccio had only two dignities, the Archpriest and the Archdeacon, and three Canons with three prebends. Pope Sixtus V added five Canons, making a total of ten members of the body. In 1695, there were two dignities and twelve Canons.

In 1759, Ajaccio had a population of around 5,000, under the political control of the Republic of Genoa, though the diocese was suffragan to the Metropolitan Archdiocese of Pisa. The Cathedral had one dignity and thirteen canons, there was one monastery of monks.

By this time, Corsica contained five other dioceses:

- Diocese of Accia (vacant since 1563, and merged with the diocese of Mariana; both suppressed in 1790);
- Diocese of Aléria, an ancient city of the Phocians, whose bishop resided at Corte;
- Diocese of Sagone, a vanished city whose bishop resided at Calvi, while the Chapter was at Vico;
- Diocese of Mariana, also a vanished city, whose bishop resided at Bastia;
- Diocese of Nebbio (whose bishop resided in the port of Saint-Florent).

This ecclesiastical organization endured when Corsica passed to French control in 1768. Following the French Revolution, the Civil Constitution of the Clergy (1791) suppressed all these bishoprics in favor of one diocese for the entire island, called the Diocese de Corse, inside the province of the Côtes de la Méditerranée.

=== Cathedral ===
There is a legend that the bishops banished from Africa to Corsica in 484 by Hunneric, Arian King of the Vandals, built with their own hands the primitive cathedral of Ajaccio. The present cathedral, dating from 1554 to 1593, owes its construction to the initiative of Gregory XIII, who while still Ugo Buoncompagni, spent some time at Ajaccio as papal legate. The see was left vacant for five years, during which time the diocesan revenues were applied to the building of the cathedral. It was finished by Bishop Giustiniani after his nomination. It is said that the cathedral was designed by Giacomo della Porta, but a guidebook remarks, "Se è vero, non era molto in forma." Napoleon Bonaparte's uncle Lucien (Luciano) was Archdeacon of the Church of Ajaccio. Napoleon was baptized in the Cathedral on 21 July 1771.

Liturgical services are held according to the Greek Byzantine rite in the village of Cargèse, founded in 1676 by the descendants of the Greek aristocrat Stephen Comnenus (Stephanos Comnenos), whom the Ottoman Turks had expelled from the Peloponnesus.

== Bishops ==
=== Before 1200 ===
- Evandrus : (313)

Sede vacante

- Benedictus : (649)

...

=== 1200 to 1400 ===
...

- Aimericus : (1309–1322)
- Vitalis Gracchi, O.E.S.A. : (1322–1342)
- Manfred de Calcinara, O.Min. : (1342–1345)
- Bertrand (Bernardo) Escharpiti, O.Min. : (1345–1348)
- Filippo de Ursone, O.Min. : (1348–1351)
- Vincenzo de Sassaro, O.Min. : (1351–1369)
- Simon : (1369–1401)

=== 1400 to 1600 ===
- Petrus Corsus : (1401–1411)
- Marco : (1411–1420)
- Paolo de Albertis, O.Min. : (1420–1422)
- Andreas Didaci de Escobar : (1422–1428)
- Lucas de Offida, O.E.S.A. : (1429–1438)
- Valeriano Calderini : (1438)
- Rafael Spinola, O.Min. : (1438–1457)
- Deodato Boctoni : (1457–1476)
- Paolo di Bonifazio : (1477–1482)
- Gabriel de Franchi, O.P. : (1482– )
- Cardinal Paolo Fregoso : (1482 – 1498?) Administrator.
- Filippo Pallavicini : (1498–1518)
- Giacomo Pallavicini : (1518–1539)
- Leonardo Tornabuoni : (1539–1540)
- Alessandro Guidiccioni : (1541–1548)
- Giovanni Battista Bernardi : (1548–1578)
- Cristoforo Guidiccioni : (1578–1582)

Sede vacante

- Giulio Giustiniani : (1587–1616)

=== 1600 to 1800 ===
- Fabiano Giustiniani, Orat. : (1616–1627)
- Ottaviano Rivarola : (1627–1651)
- Cardinal Giovanni Stefano Donghi : (1651–1655)
- Syrus Strassera, O.Theat. : (1655–1656)
- Giovanni Gregorio Ardizzoni : (1656–1685)
- Giovanni Paolo Inurea, O.Camald. (1686–1694)
- Giovanni Battista Gentile, O.S.B. : (1694–1695)
- Francesco Maria Sacco, O.Theat. : (1695–1697)
- Pietro Spinola, O.F.M.Ref. : (1698–1715)
- Agostino Spinola, C.R.Som. : (1716–1722)
- Carlo Lomellino : (1723–1741)
- Bernardino Centurione : (1741–1759)
- Benedetto Andrea Doria : (1759–1794)
  - Ignace-François Guasco (1791–1793) (Constitutional Bishop of Corse)

=== 1800 to 2000 ===
- Louis Sébastiani (de La Porta) (13 April 1802 – 9 December 1831 Died).
- Toussaint (Raffaele Sante) Casanelli d'Istria : (28 June 1833 – 12 October 1869 Died).
- Pierre-Paul de Cuttoli (21 December 1869 – 18 December 1870 Died).
- François-André-Xavier de Gaffory (27 February 1872 – 14 July 1877 Died).
- Paul-Matthieu de La Foata (21 August 1877 – 3 January 1899 Died)
- Louis Olivieri (7 December 1899 – 17 May 1903 Died)

Vacant

- Marie-Joseph Ollivier (21 February 1906 – 21 March 1906 Died)
- Jean-Baptiste Desanti (1 June 1906 – 11 February 1916 Died)
- Auguste-Joseph-Marie Simeone (27 May 1916 – 30 July 1926 Appointed, Bishop of Fréjus)
- Jean-Marcel Rodié (29 April 1927 – 7 March 1938 Appointed, Bishop of Agen)
- Jean-Baptiste-Adrien Llosa (14 September 1938 – 26 July 1966 Retired)
- André Charles Collini (26 July 1966 Succeeded – 22 December 1972 Appointed, Coadjutor Archbishop of Toulouse)
- Jean-Charles Thomas (4 February 1974 – 23 December 1986 Appointed, Coadjutor Bishop of Versailles)
- Sauveur Casanova (13 August 1987 – 5 January 1995 Retired)
- André Jean René Lacrampe, Ist. del Prado (5 January 1995 – 13 August 2003, Appointed Archbishop of Besançon)

=== Since 2000 ===
- Jean-Luc Brunin (6 May 2004 Appointed – 24 June 2011, Appointed Bishop of Le Havre)
- Olivier de Germay (22 February 2012 – 22 October 2020, Appointed Archbishop of Lyon)
- François-Xavier Bustillo O.F.M. Conv. (appointed 11 May 2021)

== See also ==
- Catholic Church in France
- List of Catholic dioceses in France

== Books ==
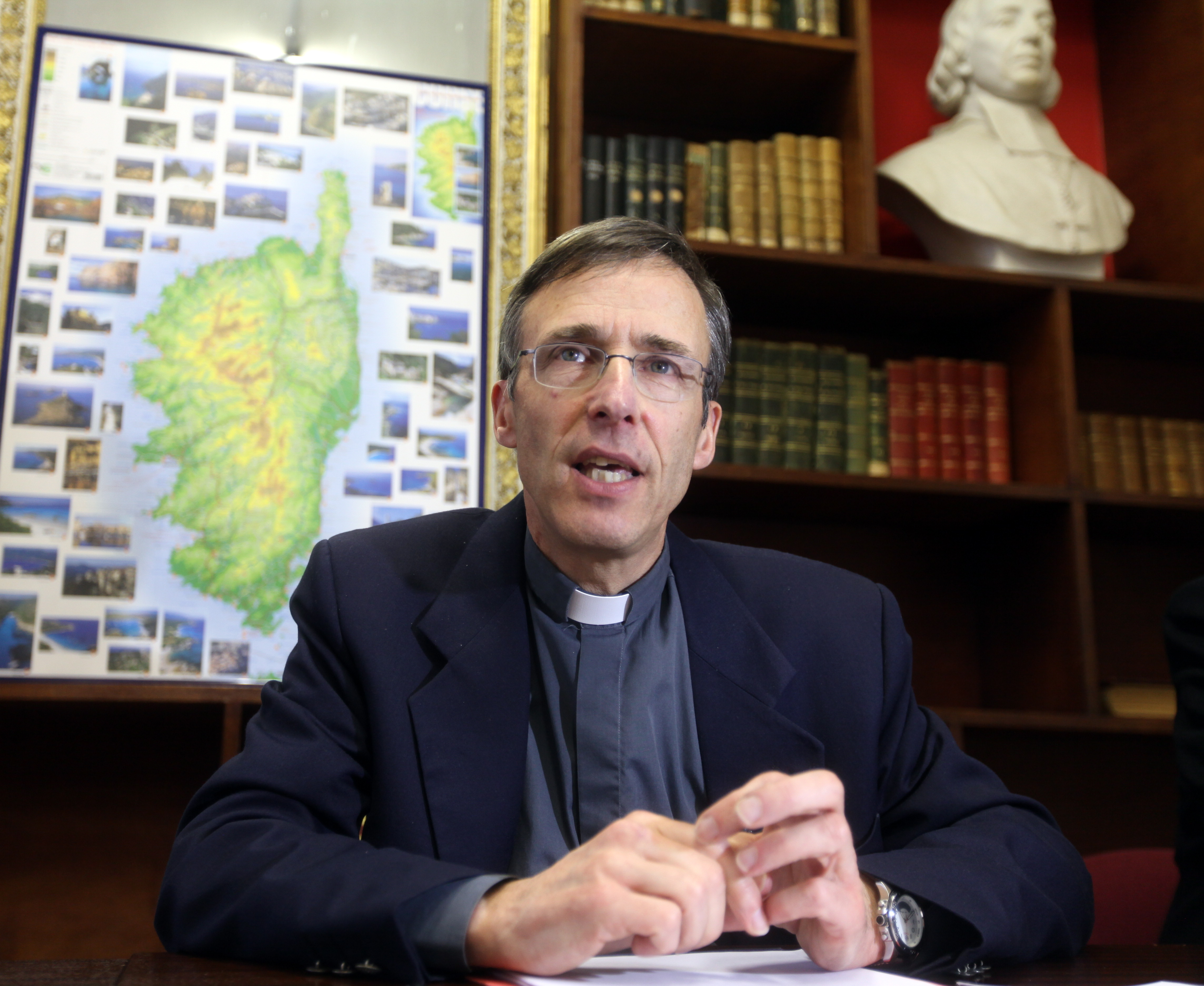
Bishop Olivier de Germay, incumbent

- Cappelletti, Giuseppe (1861). Le chiese d'Italia Tomo decimosesto Venezia: Giuseppe Antonelli. pp. 307–324. Retrieved: 2016-10-26.
- Casta, François J. (1974). Le diocèse d'Ajaccio (in French). Paris: Editions Beauchesne. GGKEY:KBKELWRL4H0.
- Eubel, Conradus, ed. (1913). Hierarchia catholica, Tomus 1 (second ed.). Münster: Libreria Regensbergiana. (in Latin)
- Eubel, Conradus, ed. (1914). Hierarchia catholica, Tomus 2 (second ed.). Münster: Libreria Regensbergiana.
- Gulik, Guilelmus (1923). Eubel, Conradus (ed.). Hierarchia catholica, Tomus 3 (second ed.). Münster: Libreria Regensbergiana.
- Gams, Pius Bonifatius (1873). Series episcoporum Ecclesiae catholicae: quotquot innotuerunt a beato Petro apostolo (in Latin). Ratisbon: Typis et Sumptibus Georgii Josephi Manz.
- Gauchat, Patritius (Patrice) (1935). Hierarchia catholica IV (1592-1667). Münster: Libraria Regensbergiana.
- Pisani, Paul (1907). Répertoire biographique de l'épiscopat constitutionnel (1791-1802) (in French). Paris: A. Picard et fils.
- Ritzler, Remigius; Sefrin, Pirminus (1952). Hierarchia catholica medii et recentis aevi V (1667-1730). Patavii: Messagero di S. Antonio.
- Ritzler, Remigius; Sefrin, Pirminus (1958). Hierarchia catholica medii et recentis aevi VI (1730-1799). Patavii: Messagero di S. Antonio.
- Ughelli, Ferdinando; Coleti, Niccolo (1718). Italia sacra sive De episcopis Italiæ, et insularum adjacentium (in Latin). Vol. Tomus tertius (3) (secunda ed.). Venice: apud Sebastianum Coleti. pp. 493–501.
