= Lattanzio =

Lattanzio is an Italian surname and given name. Notable people with the name include:

== Given name ==
- Lattanzio Gambara (c. 1530–1574), Italian painter
- Lattanzio Lattanzi (d. 1587), Italian Roman Catholic bishop
- Lattanzio Mainardi (fl. 16th century), Italian painter
- Lattanzio Pagani (active after 1543, died circa 1582), Italian painter
- Lattanzio da Rimini (active 1492 — 1505), Italian painter

== Surname ==
- Carlo Lattanzio (born 1997), Argentine footballer
- Chris Lattanzio (born 1963), American artist
- Ettore Lattanzio (born 1990), Canadian football defensive lineman
- Giannina Lattanzio (born 1993), Italian-born Ecuadorian footballer
- Patricia Lattanzio, Canadian politician and lawyer
- Vittorio Lattanzio (1926–2010), Italian politician and physician
