= Filippo Iannone =

Italian Catholic prelate (born 1957)

The Most Reverend Filippo Iannone O.Carm
- Prefect of the Dicastery for Bishops
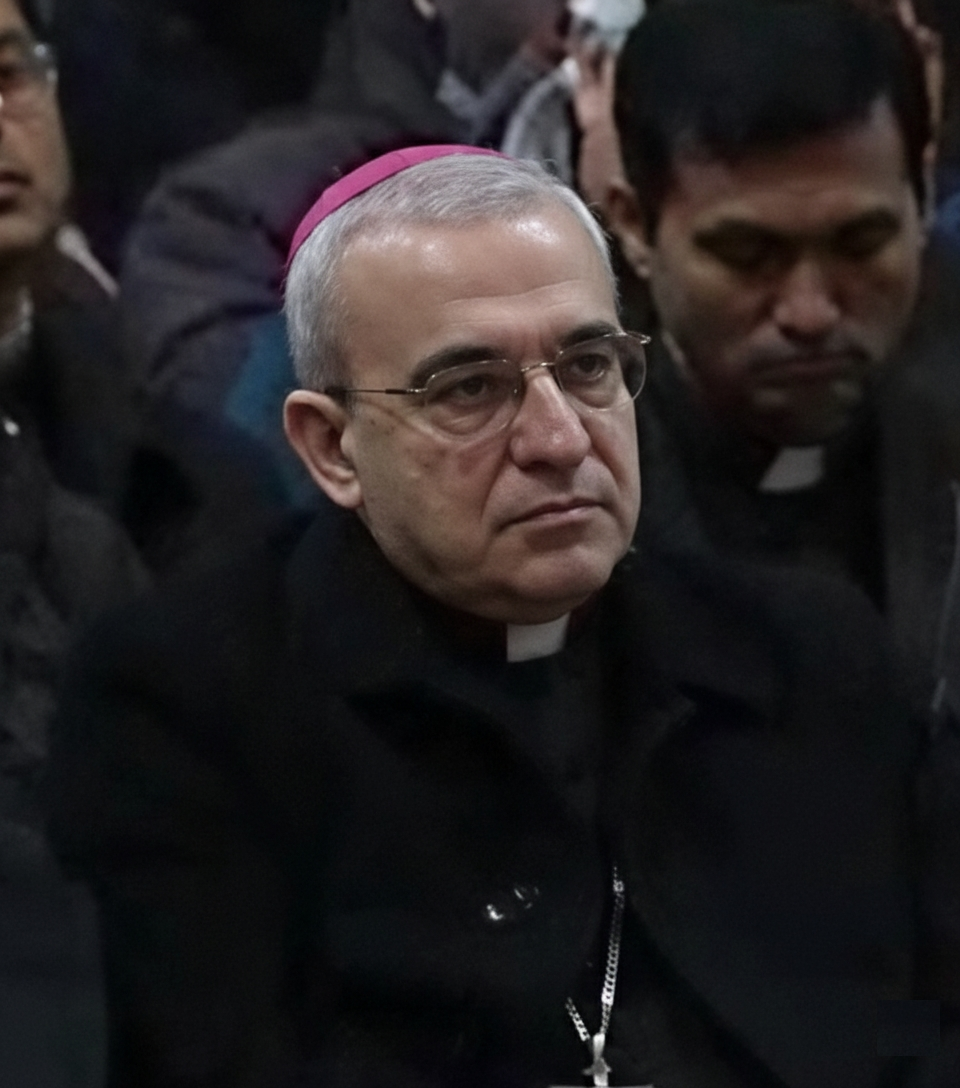
- Iannone in 2017
- Church: Catholic Church
- Appointed: 26 September 2025
- Predecessor: Robert Francis Prevost
- Previous posts: Auxiliary Bishop of Naples (2001–09); Titular Bishop of Nebbi (2001–09); Bishop of Sora-Aquino-Pontecorvo (2009–12); Vicegerent for Rome (2012–17); Adjunct Secretary of the Pontifical Council for Legislative Texts (2017–18); President of the Pontifical Council for Legislative Texts (2018–22); Prefect of the Dicastery for Legislative Texts (2022–25)

Orders
- Ordination: 26 June 1982 by Antonio Ambrosanio
- Consecration: 26 May 2001 by Michele Giordano

Personal details
- Born: 13 December 1957 (age 68) Naples, Italy
- Education: Pontifical Lateran University
- Motto: Latin: Sub tuum praesidium
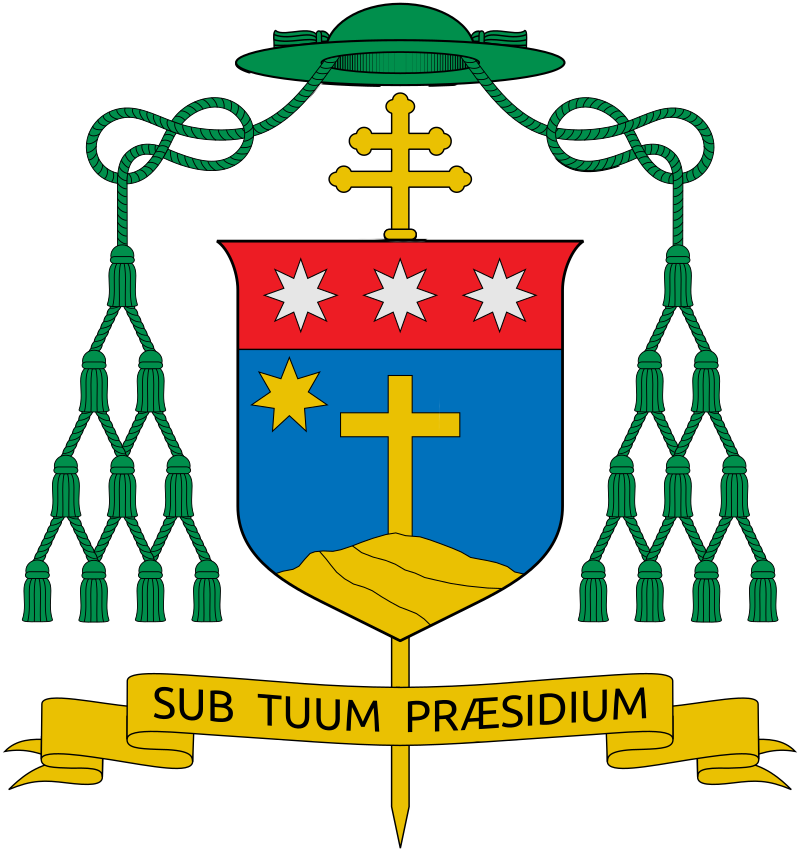
- Coat of arms

Filippo Iannone (born 13 December 1957) is an Italian Catholic prelate serving as prefect of the Dicastery for Bishops and president of the Pontifical Commission for Latin America since 15 October 2025. He was prefect Dicastery for Legislative Texts from 2022 to 2025. He has been a bishop since 2001 and an archbishop since 2012. He is a member of the Carmelites.

== Education and early career ==
Iannone was born on 13 December 1957 in Naples. On 1 August 1976, he entered the Carmelites. He was a novice at the San Martino ai Monti in Rome and then studied at the Santa Maria del Carmine in Naples. He later studied at the San Luigi Papal Theological Seminary of Southern Italy for his bachelor's degree in theology and at the Pontifical Lateran University, where he earned a doctorate in civil and canon law. After a course of study at the Roman Rota, he gained the title of avvocato rotale. He took his first vows on 1 October 1977 and his final vows on 15 October 1980. He received his priestly ordination on 26 June 1982.

He was associate professor of canon law at the Pontifical Theological Faculty of Southern Italy and a visiting professor at several other institutions. Within the Carmelite order, he worked in the regional Treasury Commissioner's office from 1985 to 1988 and for the national body from 1988 to 1991. From 1988 to 1994, he was President of the Commission for the Revision of the Constitution. For the Archdiocese of Naples, he held the position of Defender of the Faith in the Regional Court from 1987 to 1990; and Judicial vicar at the Naples Diocese Tribunal from 1990 to 1994. He was episcopal vicar for part of the Archdiocese from 1994 to 1996 and vicar general from 1996 to 2001.

== Episcopal ministry ==
On 12 April 2001, Iannone was appointed auxiliary bishop of the Archdiocese of Naples and titular bishop of Nebbi by Pope John Paul II. He received his episcopal ordination on 26 May 2001 from Cardinal Michele Giordano. At the time of his appointment, he was the youngest Italian bishop. As part of the reorganisation of the Archdiocese of Naples undertaken by Cardinal Crescenzio Sepe, he was nominated as Vicar General, co-ordinating with the clergy and moderator curiae) (lit. "Court moderators") in matters of Church administration.

On 19 June 2009, Pope Benedict XVI named him Bishop of the Diocese of Sora-Cassino-Aquino-Pontecorvo.

On 31 January 2012, Pope Benedict named him vicegerent of the Diocese of Rome, elevating him to the rank of archbishop. His appointment to that position was requested by Cardinal Agostino Vallini, the pope's vicar for Rome, who had himself come to Rome from Naples and knew Iannone's work there.

While vicegerent, Iannone played a role in handling a case of alleged financial corruption at the Istituto Dermopatico dell'Immacolata, a hospital sponsored by the Congregation of the Sons of the Immaculate Conception. His mandate concerned the impact on the Congregation.

As of December 2015, he was a member of the Supreme Tribunal of the Apostolic Signatura, a consultant to the Congregation for Institutes of Consecrated Life and Societies of Apostolic Life, a member of the Council for Legal Affairs of the Italian Episcopal Conference, and president of the Education and Culture Committee of the Lazio episcopal region.

== Curial service ==
On 11 November 2017, Pope Francis named him adjunct secretary of the Pontifical Council for Legislative Texts, identifying him by the title "Archbishop–Bishop emeritus of Sora-Aquino-Pontecorvo". He was the first to hold the title of adjunct secretary since 2000. On 7 April 2018, Pope Francis named him President of that body, which was unusual in that he was promoted above the Council's secretary, Bishop Juan Ignacio Arrieta. On 5 December 2020, Pope Francis named him a member of the Congregation for the Causes of Saints.

On 21 July 2022, as part of the Vatican's critique of the German bishops' approach to synodality, Iannone described German plans to establish a permanent synod council that included lay members as threat to episcopal authority. He objected that the German synod presumed to address issues beyond its regional jurisdiction. He has participated in ongoing discussions between senior Curial officials and the German hierarchy.

On 26 September 2025, Pope Leo XIV named Iannone his successor as prefect of the Dicastery for Bishops and president of the Pontifical Commission for Latin America. The appointments took effect on 15 October. He continues to chair the working group defining the crime of spiritual abuse, a responsibility originally assigned to the Dicastery for Legislative Texts.

Catholic Church titles
Preceded by Luca Brandolini	Bishop of Sora-Cassino-Aquino-Pontecorvo; 2009–2012	Succeeded by Gerardo Antonazzo
Preceded by Luigi Moretti	Vicegerant of Rome; 2012–2017	Succeeded by Gianpiero Palmieri
Preceded by Francesco Coccopalmerio	President of the Pontifical Council for Legislative Texts; 2018–2022	Curia reorganization
New title	President of the Dicastery for Legislative Texts; 2022–2025	Succeeded by Anthony Randazzo
Preceded by Robert Prevost	Prefect of the Dicastery for Bishops; 2025–present	Incumbent
