= Borghesi =

Borghesi (pronounced [borˈɡeːzi, -eːsi]) is an Italian surname meaning "burghers" or "bourgeois". Notable people with the name include:

- House of Borghese, Italian noble family originating as Borghese or Borghesi
- Antonio Borghesi (1949–2017), Italian politician
- Bartolomeo Borghesi (1781–1860), Italian antiquarian and early numismatic
- Diomede Borghesi (1540–1598), Italian poet, orator, literary critic and philologist
- Giada Borghesi (born 2002), Italian cyclist
- Giovanni Battista Borghesi (1790–1846), Italian painter and scenic designer
- Giovanni Ventura Borghesi (1640–1708), Italian painter
- Ippolito Borghesi (died 1627), Italian painter
- Letizia Borghesi (born 1998), Italian cyclist
- Lucio Borghesi (1642–1705), Italian Roman Catholic prelate
