= Luca Brandolini =

Italian Catholic bishop

Luca Brandolini CM
- Bishop Emeritus of Sora-Aquino-Pontecorvo
- Church: Catholic Church
- Diocese: Diocese of Sora-Aquino-Pontecorvo
- In office: 2 September 1993 – 19 June 2009
- Predecessor: Lorenzo Chiarinelli
- Successor: Filippo Iannone
- Previous posts: Titular Bishop of Urusi (1987-1993); Auxiliary Bishop of Rome (1987-1993)

Orders
- Ordination: 24 April 1960
- Consecration: 7 December 1987 by Ugo Poletti

Personal details
- Born: 25 December 1933 (age 92) Monte Compatri, Province of Rome, Kingdom of Italy

Styles of Luca Brandolini
- Reference style: The Most Reverend
- Spoken style: Your Excellency
- Religious style: Monsignor

Luca Brandolini, CM (born 25 December 1933) is an Italian prelate of the Roman Catholic Church who served as Bishop of Sora-Aquino-Pontecorvo from 1993 to 2009.

== Biography ==
Luca Brandolini was born in Monte Compatri, and entered the Congregation of the Mission, more commonly known as the Lazarists, in October 1953. He made his profession as a Lazarist on 18 October 1955, and was ordained to the priesthood on 24 April 1960. During the Second Vatican Council (1962–1965), Brandolini was "a disciple" and "close co-worker" of Archbishop Annibale Bugnini, whose episcopal ring Brandolini now wears. In 1966, he obtained a bachelor's degree in theology with specialization in liturgy from the Pontifical Liturgical Institute of S. Anselmo. He did curial and pastoral work from 1971 to 1987, also teaching at the Pontifical Gregorian and Pontifical Lateran Universities.

On 29 October 1987, Brandolini was appointed Pro-Vicar General of Rome and Titular Bishop of Urusi by Pope John Paul II. He received his episcopal consecration on the following 7 December from Ugo Cardinal Poletti, with Archbishop Ennio Appignanesi and Bishop Plinio Pascoli serving as co-consecrators. Brandolini was later named President of the Italian Episcopal Conference's Commission for Liturgy in May 1993, and Bishop of Sora-Aquino-Pontecorvo on 2 September 1993.

He retired from this see in June 2009.

Brandolini disapproved of Pope Benedict XVI's Summorum Pontificum, saying to La Repubblica, "I can't fight back the tears. This is the saddest moment in my life as a man, priest and bishop...It's a day of mourning, not just for me but for the many people who worked for the Second Vatican Council. A reform for which many people worked, with great sacrifice and only inspired by the desire to renew the Church, has now been cancelled". However, he did declare, "I will obey the Holy Father, because I am a bishop and because I care for him".

He has also served as President of the Liturgical Action Centre.
