= William Duffy (bishop) =

Roman Catholic prelate and bishop

Most Reverend William Duffy
- Suffragan bishop of York; Titular Bishop of Ascalon
- Church: Catholic Church
- Archdiocese: Archdiocese of York
- In office: 1535–?
- Previous post: suffragan bishop to the Bishop of St Asaph (1531–1535)

William Duffy was a Roman Catholic prelate who served as Titular Bishop of Ascalon (1531–?), suffragan bishop to the Bishop of St Asaph (1531–1535) and suffragan bishop to the Archbishop of York (1535–?).

== Biography ==
William Duffy was ordained a priest in the Order of Friars Minor. On 10 July 1531, he was appointed during the papacy of Pope Paul II as Titular Bishop of Ascalon and Auxiliary Bishop of St Asaph. On 16 July 1531, he was consecrated bishop by Octavio de Cesi, Bishop of Cervia, with Bernardo Ruggieri, Bishop Emeritus of Sora serving as one of the co-consecrators. He served as suffragan bishop to the Bishop of St Asaph until his appointment as suffragan bishop to the Archbishop of York in 1535. Probably to be identified with William Duffield, Bishop of "Ascalensis," and Vicar of Barton-upon-Humber, Lincolnshire, who functioned as a suffragan (auxiliary) bishop in the dioceses of Lincoln and York 1535–38. He was executed for treason in 1538 after repudiating the royal supremacy.

== External links and additional sources ==
- Cheney, David M. "Archdiocese of York". Catholic-Hierarchy.org. (for Chronology of Bishops)^{self-published}
- Chow, Gabriel. "Metropolitan Archdiocese of York (England)". GCatholic.org. (for Chronology of Bishops)^{self-published}
