= Bonifacio di Castel Lotario =

Most Reverend Bonifacio di Castel Lotario
- Bishop of Chiusi
- Church: Catholic Church
- Diocese: Diocese of Chiusi
- In office: 1503–1504
- Successor: Niccolò Bonafede

Personal details
- Died: 1504 Chiusi, Italy

Bonifacio di Castel Lotario (died 1504) was a Roman Catholic prelate who served as Bishop of Chiusi (1503–1504).

== Biography ==
On 8 February 1503, Bonifacio di Castel Lotario was appointed during the papacy of Pope Alexander VI as Bishop of Chiusi. He served as Bishop of Chiusi until his death in 1504.

== External links and additional sources ==
- Cheney, David M. "Diocese of Chiusi e Pienza". Catholic-Hierarchy.org. (for Chronology of Bishops) ^{[self-published]}
- Chow, Gabriel. "Diocese of Chiusi (Italy)". GCatholic.org. (for Chronology of Bishops) ^{[self-published]}

Catholic Church titles
Preceded by	Bishop of Chiusi; 1503–1504	Succeeded by Niccolò Bonafede
