= Bernardino Rocci =

Italian Roman Catholic cardinal

His Eminence Bernardino Rocci
- Cardinal-Priest of Santo Stefano al Monte Celio; Archbishop (Personal Title) of Orvieto
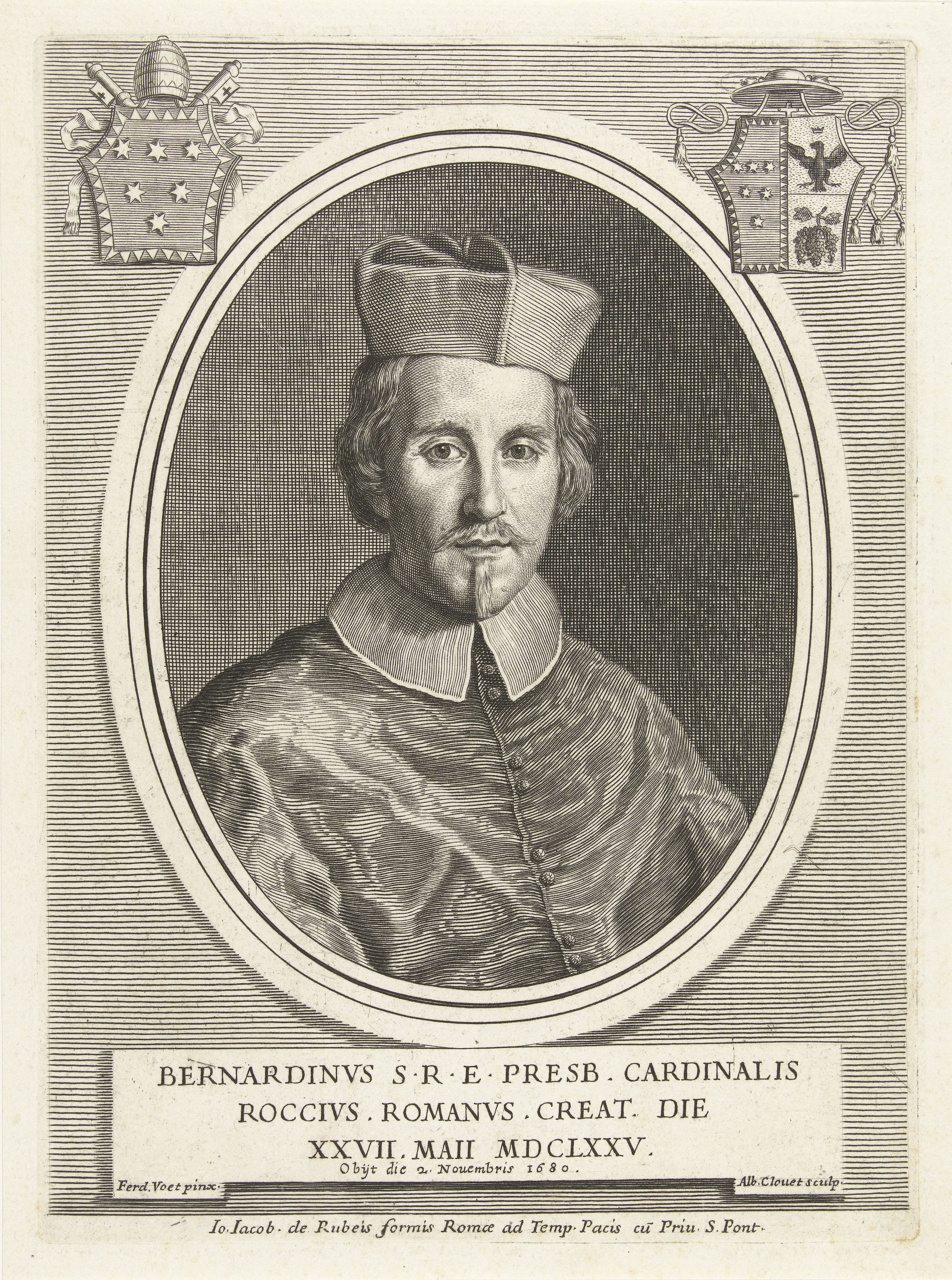
- Church: Catholic Church

Orders
- Consecration: 22 April 1668 by Giulio Gabrielli

Personal details
- Born: 21 August 1627 Rome, Italy
- Died: 2 Nov 1680 (age 53)

Bernardino Rocci (1627–1680) was a Roman Catholic cardinal.

On 22 April 1668, he was consecrated bishop by Giulio Gabrielli, Cardinal-Bishop of Sabina, with Emilio Bonaventura Altieri, Bishop Emeritus of Camerino, and Carlo de' Vecchi, Titular Archbishop of Athenae, serving as co-consecrators.
