= Bartolomeo Ferratini =

Roman Catholic prelate

Most Reverend Bartolomeo Ferratini
- Bishop of Chiusi
- Church: Catholic Church
- Diocese: Diocese of Chiusi
- In office: 1533–1534
- Predecessor: Niccolò Bonafede
- Successor: Gregorio Magalotti
- Previous post: Bishop of Sora (1531–1534)

Orders
- Consecration: 17 April 1533 by Gabriele Mascioli Foschi

Personal details
- Died: June 1534

Bartolomeo Ferratini (died 1534) was a Roman Catholic prelate who served as Bishop of Chiusi (1534) and Bishop of Sora (1531–1534). He was Prefect of the papal household (Majordomo) from 1533 to 1534.

== Biography ==
Ferratini belonged to a noble family of Amelia. He studied in Rome, and obtained the degree of Doctor in utroque iure. Pope Julius II appointed him a Canon of the Vatican Basilica, and Assessor of the commissaries of the tithe, as well as a collector of papal revenues.

In 1528, Ferratini was Vice-Legate of Pope Clement VII in Piacenza.

On 8 Nov 1531, Bartolomeo Ferratini was appointed Bishop of Sora by Pope Clement VII. He was still serving as Vice Legate of Perugia and Unbria, however, in April 1532, when Clement sent him the large sum of 1,800 gold ducats for administration of the city of Perugia.

The Master of the Sacred Palaces (papal majordomo), Msgr. Giuliano Visconti, bishop-elect of Alba, died suddenly, at the age of thirty, on 5 January 1533. He was succeeded almost immediately by Bartolomeo Ferratini.

After seventeen months, on 17 April 1533, he was consecrated bishop by Gabriele Mascioli Foschi, Archbishop of Durrës, with Pedro Flores, Bishop of Castellammare di Stabia, and Rodolfo Pio, Bishop of Faenza, serving as co-consecrators.

On 14 January 1534, he was appointed Bishop of Chiusi by Pope Clement. He enjoyed the prerogatives of the Bishop of Chiusi until his death in June 1534, though his service to Pope Clement as his Master of the Apostolic Palaces (Majordomo) required his personal attendance on the pope. He traveled with Clement to Bologna in 1533, and to Marseille in 1534.

== Sources ==
- D. Busolini, "Bartolomeo Ferratini (1475-1534)", in Dizionario biografico degli italiani, XLVI, Roma 1996, pp. 774–775. (in Italian)

== External links and additional sources ==
- Cheney, David M. "Diocese of Sora-Cassino-Aquino-Portecorvino". Catholic-Hierarchy.org. (for Chronology of Bishops) ^{[self-published]}
- Chow, Gabriel. "Diocese of Sora-Cassino-Aquino-Portecorvino (Italy)". GCatholic.org. (for Chronology of Bishops) ^{[self-published]}
- Cheney, David M. "Diocese of Chiusi e Pienza". Catholic-Hierarchy.org. (for Chronology of Bishops) ^{[self-published]}
- Chow, Gabriel. "Diocese of Chiusi (Italy)". GCatholic.org. (for Chronology of Bishops) ^{[self-published]}

Catholic Church titles
Preceded by Adriano Mascheroni	Bishop of Sora; 1531–1534	Succeeded by Eliseo Teodino
Preceded by Niccolò Bonafede	Bishop of Chiusi; 1534	Succeeded by Gregorio Magalotti
