= Marco Antonio Marescotti =

Roman Catholic prelate and Bishop of Chiusi

Most Reverend Marco Antonio Marescotti
- Bishop of Chiusi
- Church: Catholic Church
- Diocese: Diocese of Chiusi
- In office: 1664–1681
- Predecessor: Alessandro Piccolomini
- Successor: Lucio Borghesi

Orders
- Ordination: 2 February 1664

Personal details
- Born: 29 April 1625 Siena, Italy
- Died: 8 December 1681 (age 56) Chiusi, Italy

Marco Antonio Marescotti (29 April – 8 December 1681) was a Roman Catholic prelate who served as Bishop of Chiusi (1664–1681).

== Biography ==
Marco Antonio Marescotti was born in Siena, Italy and ordained a priest on 2 February 1664. On 11 February 1664, Alessandro Piccolomini was appointed during the papacy of Pope Alexander VII as Bishop of Chiusi. He served as Bishop of Chiusi until his death on 8 December 1681.

== External links and additional sources ==
- Cheney, David M. "Diocese of Chiusi e Pienza". Catholic-Hierarchy.org. (for Chronology of Bishops) ^{[self-published]}
- Chow, Gabriel. "Diocese of Chiusi (Italy)". GCatholic.org. (for Chronology of Bishops) ^{[self-published]}

Catholic Church titles
Preceded by Alessandro Piccolomini	Bishop of Chiusi; 1664–1681	Succeeded by Lucio Borghesi
