= Alessandro Piccolomini (bishop of Chiusi) =

Most Reverend Alessandro Piccolomini
- Bishop of Chiusi
- Church: Catholic Church
- Diocese: Diocese of Chiusi
- In office: 1657–1661
- Predecessor: Carlo de' Vecchi
- Successor: Marco Antonio Marescotti

Personal details
- Died: 6 November 1661 Chiusi, Italy

Alessandro Piccolomini (died 6 November 1661) was a Roman Catholic prelate who served as Bishop of Chiusi (1657–1661).

On 12 March 1657, Alessandro Piccolomini was appointed during the papacy of Pope Alexander VII as Bishop of Chiusi. He served as Bishop of Chiusi until his death on 6 November 1661.

== External links and additional sources ==
- Cheney, David M. "Diocese of Chiusi e Pienza". Catholic-Hierarchy.org. (for Chronology of Bishops) ^{[self-published]}
- Chow, Gabriel. "Diocese of Chiusi (Italy)". GCatholic.org. (for Chronology of Bishops) ^{[self-published]}

Catholic Church titles
| Preceded by Carlo de' Vecchi | Bishop of Chiusi; 1657–1661 | Succeeded by Marco Antonio Marescotti |
