= Bernardo Ruggieri =

Roman Catholic prelate

Most Reverend Bernardo Ruggieri
- Bishop of Sora
- Church: Catholic Church
- Diocese: Diocese of Sora
- In office: 1511–1530
- Predecessor: Giacomo de Massimi
- Successor: Adriano Mascheroni

Bernardo Ruggieri was a Roman Catholic prelate who served as Bishop of Sora (1511–1530).

== Biography ==
On 12 December 1511, Bernardo Ruggieri was appointed during the papacy of Pope Julius II as Bishop of Sora. He served as Bishop of Sora until his resignation in 1530. While bishop, he was the principal co-consecrator of Giovanni Angelo Arcimboldi, Bishop of Novara (1526), and William Duffy (bishop), Auxiliary Bishop of Saint Asaph (1531).

== External links and additional sources ==
- Cheney, David M. "Diocese of Sora-Cassino-Aquino-Portecorvino". Catholic-Hierarchy.org. (for Chronology of Bishops) ^{[self-published]}
- Chow, Gabriel. "Diocese of Sora-Cassino-Aquino-Portecorvino (Italy)". GCatholic.org. (for Chronology of Bishops) ^{[self-published]}

Catholic Church titles
| Preceded by Giacomo de Massimi | Bishop of Sora; 1511–1530 | Succeeded by Adriano Mascheroni |
