= Paula Frassinetti =

Italian Roman Catholic saint

Saint Paula Frassinetti
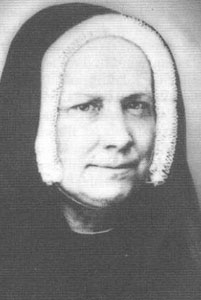

Foundress
- Born: March 3, 1809; Genoa, Gênes, French Empire
- Died: June 11, 1882
- Venerated in: Roman Catholic Church
- Beatified: June 8, 1930 by Pope Pius XI
- Canonized: March 11, 1984 by Pope John Paul II
- Feast: June 11

Paula Frassinetti is an Italian saint in the Roman Catholic Church and foundress of the Congregation of the Sisters of Saint Dorothy (aka, Congregazione Suore di S. Dorotea della Frassinetti). Her feast day is June 11.

== Life ==
Paula Frassinetti was born March 3, 1809, in Genoa, Italy to Giovanni Battista Frassinetti, a cloth merchant, and his wife Angela. The third of five children, her four brothers all became priests. When she was nine years old, her mother died and an aunt came to help with the household. Three years later her aunt died, and at the age of twelve, Frassinetti assumed the responsibility.

At the age of nineteen, Frassinetti went to stay with her brother Giuseppe Frassinetti, a priest at the seaside village of Quinto in Liguria. In 1834 she and six other women formed a small community called the "Daughters of Holy Faith". Giuseppe and members of the parish started a small school in a church that had been dedicated to Clare of Assisi. The sisters taught in the school. They went to Genoa to help during a breakout of cholera.

In 1835 Luca Passi, of Bergamo, a friend of her brother Giuseppe, asked Frassinetti if she would assume the Pious Work of Saint Dorothy, a project he had founded to serve the poorest and most needy youth. Thereafter the Daughters of Holy Faith became known as the Sisters of Saint Dorothy. On May 19, 1841, Frassinetti established a house in Rome. The work of the institute expanded beyond Liguria and Rome, to other parts of Italy as new houses, boarding schools, and orphanages were established. Later the sisters established a presence in Malta, Portugal, and Brazil. In the United Kingdom the sisters run an International Student's Residence and are involved in Parish Ministry.

She died on June 11, 1882, after a bout with pneumonia following several strokes.

Her body was reported to be found to be incorrupt in 1906.

== Veneration ==
Frassinetti was beatified by Pope Pius XI on June 8, 1930, and the cause for her canonization was opened on April 10, 1935. She was canonized on March 11, 1984, by Pope John Paul II.

== Legacy ==
There are about 1,200 sisters active in Europe, Latin America, Africa and Asia.

== Quotes ==
- "Work in full simplicity"
- "We're in God's hands, and we are so very well"
- "Our mission is to educate through heart and love
- "The will of God is my paradise"
