= Adriano Mascheroni =

Roman Catholic prelate

Most Reverend Adriano Mascheroni
- Bishop of Sora
- Church: Catholic Church
- Diocese: Diocese of Sora
- In office: 1530–1531
- Predecessor: Bernardo Ruggieri
- Successor: Bartolomeo Ferratini

Personal details
- Died: 1531 Sora, Italy

Adriano Mascheroni (died 1531) was a Roman Catholic prelate who served as Bishop of Sora (1530–1531).

== Biography ==
On 21 October 1530, Adriano Mascheroni was appointed during the papacy of Pope Clement VII as Bishop of Sora. He served as Bishop of Sora until his death in 1531.

== External links and additional sources ==
- Cheney, David M. "Diocese of Sora-Cassino-Aquino-Portecorvino". Catholic-Hierarchy.org. (for Chronology of Bishops) ^{[self-published]}
- Chow, Gabriel. "Diocese of Sora-Cassino-Aquino-Portecorvino (Italy)". GCatholic.org. (for Chronology of Bishops) ^{[self-published]}

Catholic Church titles
Preceded by Bernardo Ruggieri	Bishop of Sora; 1530–1531	Succeeded by Bartolomeo Ferratini
