= Giuseppe Frassinetti =

Italian priest (1804–1868)

Venerable Paolo Giuseppe Maria Frassinetti FSMI
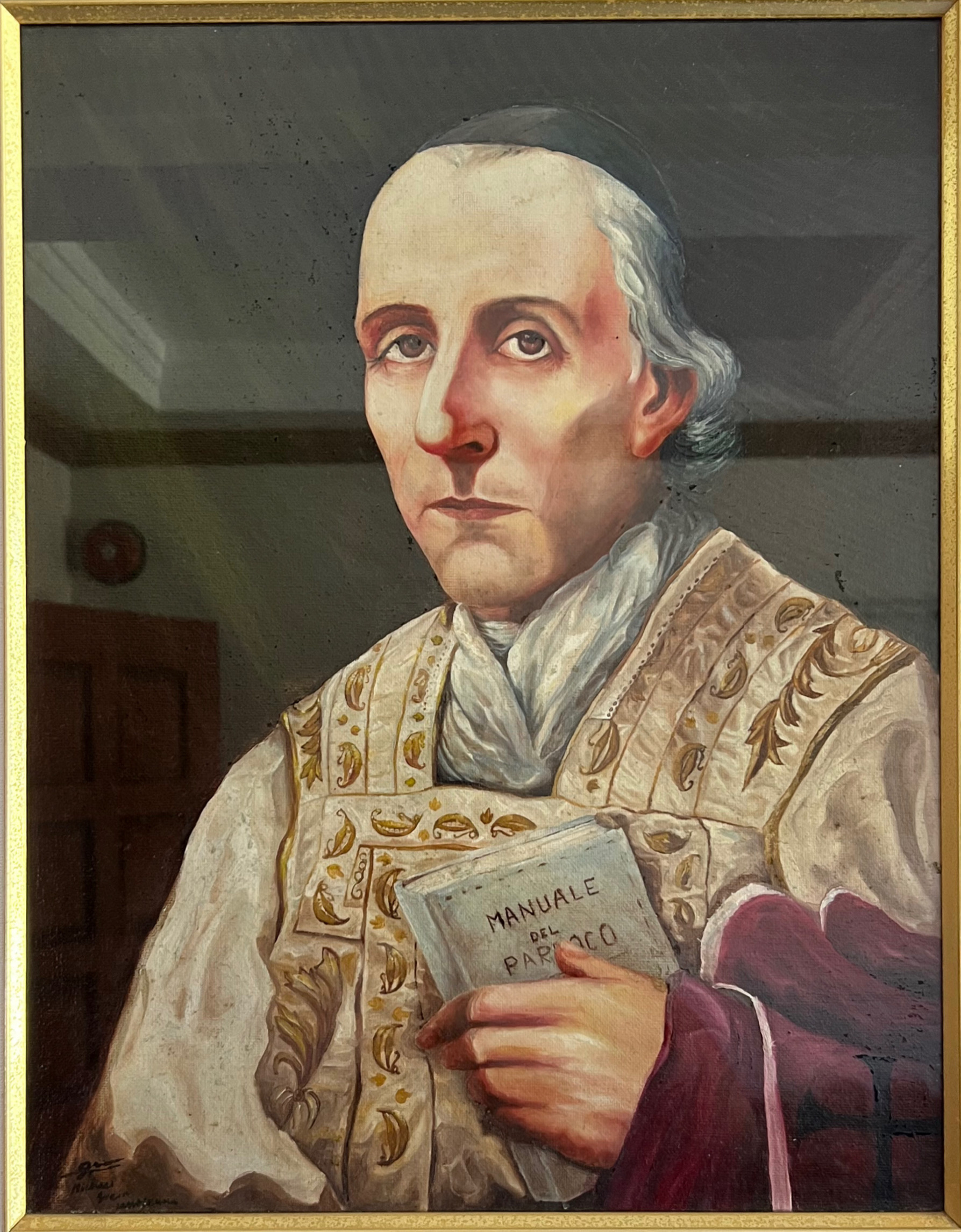
- Venerable Joseph Frassinetti
- Born: December 15, 1804; Vico San Paolo, corner Vico Carlone, Genoa, Italy
- Died: January 2, 1868 (aged 63); Santa Sabina, Genoa, Italy
- Resting place: Genoa, Italy

Don Paolo Giuseppe Maria Frassinetti, also known as Joseph Frassinetti (1804–1868), was an Italian Catholic priest who founded the Congregation of the Sons of Holy Mary Immaculate.

== Early life and family ==
Joseph Frassinetti, whose baptismal name was Paolo Giuseppe Maria, was born in Genoa, Italy on December 15, 1804. His parents were Giovanni Battista Frassinetti and Angela Viale. His father owned a small fabric store, which allowed the family a modest lifestyle. The parents brought up their children with an emphasis on austerity and piety, in accordance with their religious beliefs. Out of the family's eleven children, only five siblings survived childhood: Joseph, Francesco, Paola, Giovanni, and Rafaele.

Frassinetti's mother brought the children up with a deep Marian devotion. Following a traditional custom among the Catholics of Genoa, she brought all her children, once they reached the age of reason, to the Shrine of La Madonnetta, on the Hill of Carbonara, for them to offer their heart to the Virgin Mary. Angela Viale's unexpected death on January 6, 1819 greatly disturbed the family's life. Giovanni Frassinetti's sister, Antonietta, lived with the family and took on a maternal role for the children following Viale's death, until her own death seven years later. After this point, the responsibility of being the governess of the house fell on Paola, who was seventeen years old at that time. During this time, Joseph attended the Archdiocesan Seminary of Genoa as an outsider; meaning he would attend classes during the day and then return home at the night.

== Education ==
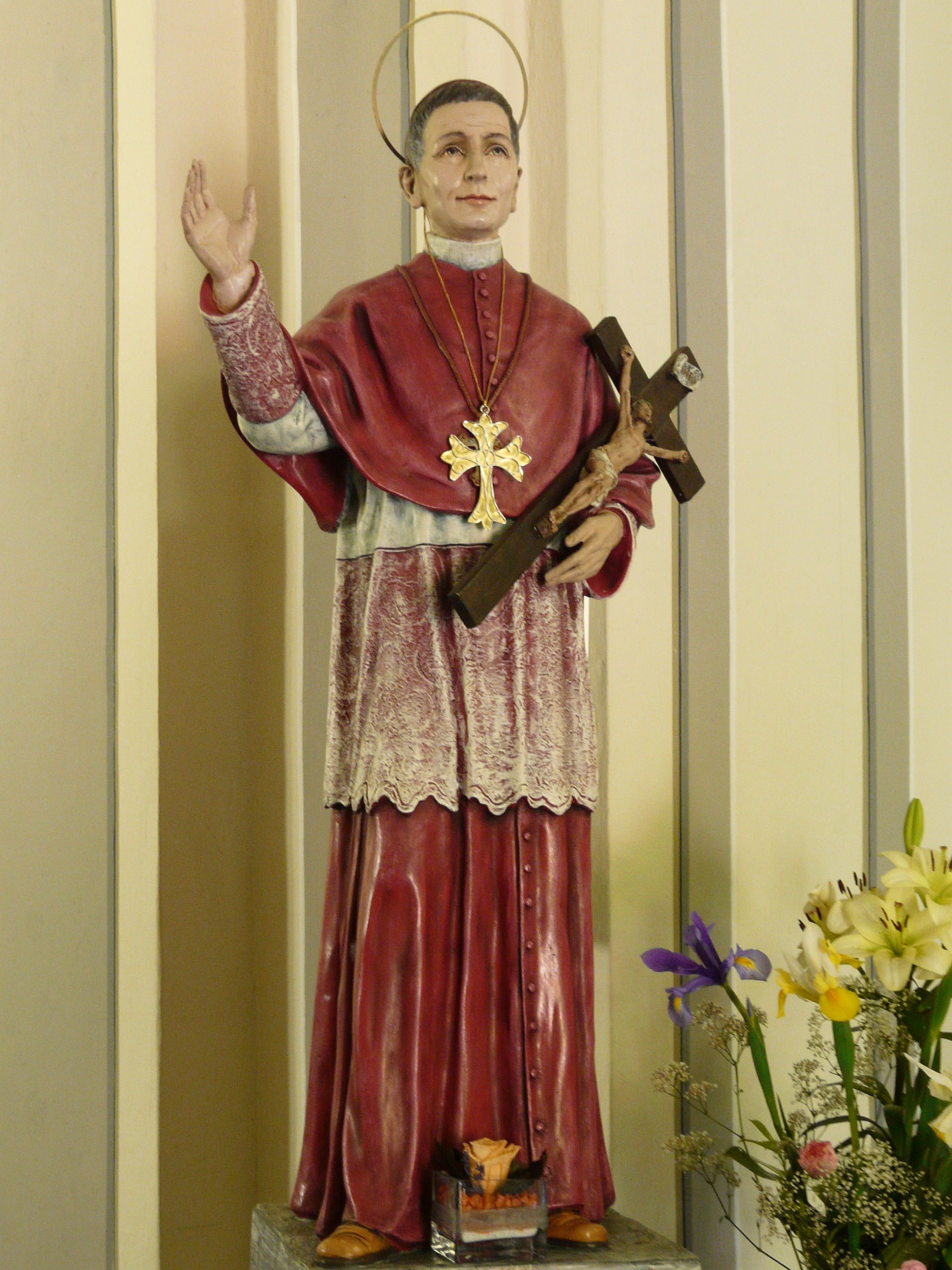
Saint Antonio Maria Gianelli, professor and lifelong friend of Frassinetti. He became the Bishop of Bobbio in 1838. He died on June 7, 1846; was Beatified on April 19, 1925, by Pius XI; and canonized on October 21, 1951, by Pius XII.

Joseph was a proficient and serious student at the Seminary of Genoa. Among his professors were Antonio Maria Gianelli—now a Saint—who became the Bishop of Bobbio. In addition to teaching Rhetorics, he had organized the Academy of the Simple-hearted, whose purpose was to foster creativity and love for literature among the young seminarians. Every year, some artistic presentations were organized, in which the best students would present their poetic and literary compositions. Joseph was among the most active in these events. From these activities, Joseph learned from his professor to esteem christocentric spirituality, and to value the morality of St. Alphonsus Maria de Liguori, which was in opposition to the dominant rigorism of the time.

On June 9, 1827, Frassinetti was ordained to the Diaconate, and on September 22 to the Priesthood. Both ordinations were held in Savona, through the imposition of hands of Joseph Vincenzo Airenti, the bishop of that Diocese, since the Archdiocese of Genoa was at that time sede vacante.

Frassinetti wrote later on, in his "Clarifications on My Past" (Rischiaramenti sul mio passato): "As soon as I was ordained a priest, a strong desire took possession of my heart to help the young clergy, as much as I could, in my nothingness and trusting only in divine help - and it seemed to me that much could have been done for them." He was passionate about his vocation and eager to support his fellow priests in the apostolate. In 1852, he would write "Jesus Christ, Model of the Priest" (Gesù Cristo, regola del sacerdote), a book for priests written with the intention of comforting and inciting them in doing good. The care for priestly vocations, as well as the attention in fostering fraternity among priests and the commitment to their spiritual, cultural, and moral formation, would become his specific charism.

== The Congregation of Blessed Leonardo ==
After his ordination, Frassinetti was sent as vicar to the parish of Santo Stefano in Genoa, where he dedicated himself particularly to the catechesis for children.

During this time, there were a number of priestly associations involved in preaching and religious instruction in the area; notably: The Urban Missionaries and The Evangelical Workers, of which Frassinetti was an active and zealous member. In addition to this, Frassinetti founded the Congregation of Blessed Leonardo of Porto Maurizio with his best friend and fellow seminarian, Luigi Strula. The Congregation was borne out of an idea conceived by Strula for "an Association" that would bring together the priests and seminarians involved in the Pious Works of Saint Raphael and the Pious Works of Saint Dorothy, two institutions established by Luca de' Passi during the Lent of 1829 for the catechetical instruction of children.

In addition to the commitment to catechetical activity, the members of the Congregation of Blessed Leonardo of Porto Maurizio were dedicated to developing their spirituality and caring for the formation of new generations. It was well accepted in Genoa by the young clergy who, thanks to it, were formed in the doctrine of St. Thomas Aquinas and in the morals of St. Alphonsus Maria de Liguori. Other characteristics of the institution were fidelity to the Pope and the opposition to Jansenism, which was still alive in the region of Liguria. These aspects, together with sympathetic feelings towards the Society of Jesus, aroused some mistrust and persecution, which caused the closure of the Congregation in 1848.

Some young priests collaborated in this academy; among them were: Gaetano Alimonda, who would become the Archbishop of Turin; Salvatore Magnasco, soon to be Archbishop of Genoa; Filippo Gentile, then appointed Bishop of Novara; and Tommaso Reggio, now Blessed, who was appointed first Bishop of Ventimiglia and then Archbishop of Genoa.

== Parishes of Quinto and Santa Sabina ==
In 1831, Fr. Joseph won the competition to become parish priest—as was the practice at the time for assigning posts—of Quinto al Mare, a small town on the east coast of Liguria (Riviera di Levante), a few kilometers from the capital city of Genoa. The first thing he did in his new post was to search for collaborators, whom he found in assistants Pietro Boccalandro and the Reverend Figari. Joseph devoted himself to helping the needy and offering free private lessons to poor children.

In 1835, a cholera epidemic spread throughout Liguria, and Quinto was not spared. In three successive waves, from August 1835 to September 1837, the disease claimed the lives of approximately 100 townspeople. With the assistance of other clergy, Frassinetti personally organized the spiritual care of the sick. Given the emergency, he also requested help from the Capuchin Fathers of Quarto.

In the meantime, he continued his collaboration with the Congregation of Blessed Leonardo, attending weekly meetings in Genoa. During this time, he wrote the Exhortation, an instructive manuscript for his contemporaries. In it, Joseph pointed to Rome as the center of Catholicism, and urged the priests to remain united under the guidance of the Pope. It contained also some apologetics against Jansenism. The Exhortation was so appreciated by the Marquis Giuseppe Durazzo, that he proposed to have it printed at his own expense. After being revised by Fr. Picconi, a learned Barnabite, the book was published in 1837 with the title, "Proposed Reflections to the Ecclesiastics" (Riflessioni proposte agli ecclesiastici).

On June 1st, 1839, Joseph left Quinto and took up the post of the Priory of Santa Sabina, a parish located in the historical center of Genoa in a predominantly working-class neighborhood; Fr. Boccalandro succeeded him in the parish of Quinto. The parishioners of Quinto depicted Joseph and his sister Paola on the apse of the Church of San Pietro as a sign of gratitude.

The church of Santa Sabina dated back to the sixth century, and had been destroyed by the Saracens at the beginning of the tenth century. The Benedictines, who rebuilt it a hundred years later on a higher ground, took care of it until the seventeenth century, when it passed under the diocesan clergy, with the title of Priory. During his time as Prior, Joseph published over one hundred works to support the pastoral ministry and the spiritual development of laypeople.

== Exile and return ==
In the 1840s, the issue of the "Italian Resurgence" was gaining momentum. The situation was complex due to the presence of the Papacy and the existence of Papal States.

The Congregation of Blessed Leonardo, which was pro-Vatican and anti-Jansenist, had friendly relations with the Jesuits, and was unwillingly involved in the controversy. However, in 1846, in response to the "Prolegomena" of Vincenzo Gioberti, which criticized the Society of Jesus for its involvement in politics, Fr. Frassinetti wrote the, "Essay on Dialectics and Religion by Vincenzo Gioberti", which defended the Jesuits. Gioberti counteracted with another writing, "The Modern Jesuit" (Il Gesuita moderno), which triggered a persecution against the Jesuits and their supporters, mocked as "Jesuitish" (Gesuitanti). Several members of the Congregation of Blessed Leonardo and the Institute of Saint Dorothy were among these supporters. While some leaders were ordered to leave their posts, others abandoned Genoa in favor of exile, due to the danger of the situation. Frassinetti took refuge first with his friend, Angelo Remondini; and then with Gerolamo Campanella in San Cipriano in the Polcevera Valley. During this period that he began to write "The Moral Theology of St. Alphonsus", on which he worked for about eighteen years. Moreover, he immersed himself in the reading of the Carmelite mystics - St. Teresa of Avila and St. John of the Cross, whose spirituality he adopted as his own.

In the spring of 1849, the Prior was able to return to Santa Sabina, where he resumed his apostolic work. After consultation with his friends, he decided not to resurrect the Congregation of Blessed Leonardo, and sought new forms of apostolate, more appropriate to the new social and historical situation.As such, he promoted the "Pious Association for the Preservation and Increase of the Faith", with the full support of the new Archbishop of Genoa, Andrea Charvaz. The Association can be considered an anticipation of the so-called Catholic Action Movement.

In 1854, together with Salvatore Magnasco, then a Canon of the Archdiocese of Genoa, and a few other friends, he laid the foundations for the "Workers' Mutual Aid Society", named after Saint John the Baptist, which was the first of its kind in Italy. The Society provided mutual assistance among workers in case of illness and calamity, and fostered their religious and social promotion.

== "Consecration in the World" ==
A particular aspect of Frassinetti's pastoral commitment was the promotion of the so-called "Consecrated Men and Women in the World"; that is, persons willing to live the evangelical counsels of poverty, chastity and obedience, while remaining in their family and occupation.

This began when Domenico Pestarino, a friend of Frassinetti, was rendering his pastoral service in Mornese, a town of the Monferrato, part of the Diocese of Acqui Terme. Among his penitents was Angela Maccagno, a young woman from a wealthy family. Her desire was to consecrate her life to God while remaining with her family. Encouraged by Pestarino, she started searching for companions with similar wishes. In 1853, Pestarino suggested Angela to write a draft of the rules of the group, and to have them sent to Frassinetti in Genoa for evaluation.

After carefully examining the draft, Joseph proposed a more organic and complete arrangement of the articles. The new Institute officially began in December 1855, under the name of the "Pious Union of the Daughters of Holy Mary Immaculate": it included Angela and five other companions, among whom was Maria Domenica Mazzarello - the future co-foundress of the Daughters of Mary Help of Christians.

The following summer, the Pious Union was established in the parish of Santa Sabina. In 1959, Joseph wrote "The Nun at Home" (La Monaca in casa) for the group, a manual of spirituality for consecrated women who live in their families. He also wrote two biographies of consecrated women in the world: that of Rosa Cordone and of Rosina Pedemonte. The booklets were quite successful, and were also reprinted in the "Catholic Readings" (Letture Cattoliche) published by Don Bosco.

Soon afterward, a young man from the parish of Santa Sabina, inspired by the reading of one of these biographies, proposed to Joseph the secular consecration of men as well. At first, he encouraged him to find some companions; then, in between November 1860 and the following year, he laid the foundations for the "Pious Union of the Sons of Holy Mary Immaculate" (Pia Unione dei Figli di Santa Maria Immacolata), for which he composed the rules as well. In the following years, the pious union grew steadily in Genoa and nearby places, including Mornese, reaching over fifty members.

Frassinetti was delighted when Pius IX, on July 11, 1861, extended the mass and the office of Saint Angela Merici to the entire Catholic Church, proposing her as a contemplative living in the world, and as the foundress of an organization of consecrated seculars, the so-called "Society of Saint Ursula". Seeing the similarity of intent, he understood that the Daughters of Holy Mary Immaculate were spiritually linked to the charism of St. Angela Merici. In 1863, with the approval of Angela Maccagno, and the blessing of Fr. Pestarino, he wrote the "Rule of the New Ursulines, Daughters of Holy Mary Immaculate, under the protection of Saint Ursula and Saint Angela Merici" (Regola delle Nuove Orsoline, Figlie di Santa Maria Immacolata, sotto la protezione di Sant'Orsola e Sant'Angela Merici), which provided clear guidelines for the associates scattered all around Italy.

The male Pious Union did not survive long after the death of Frassinetti in 1868; the female one had varied results. Notably, some of the consecrated women continued in his footsteps and carried out their apostolate until the Second Vatican Council.

== Final years and legacy ==
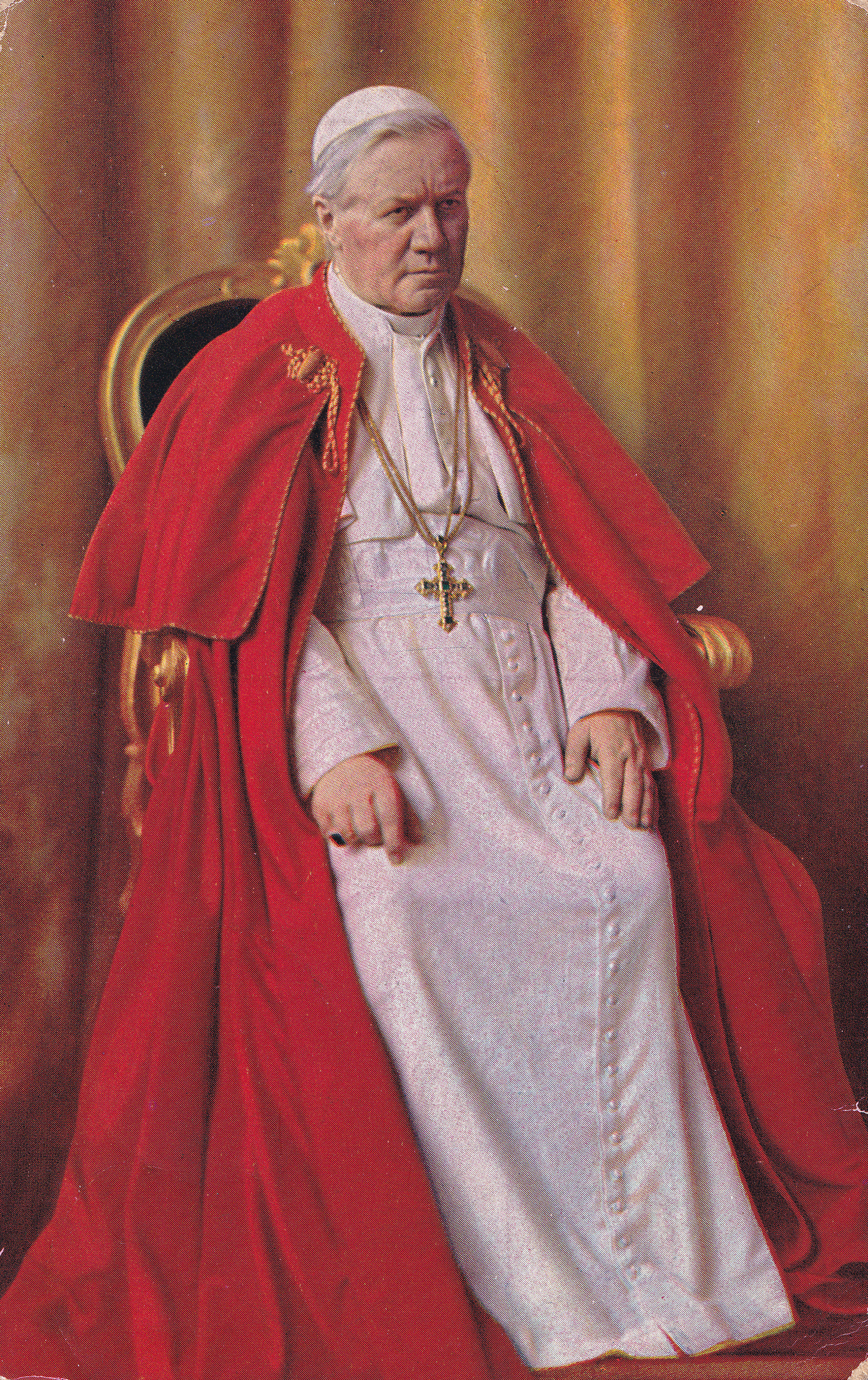
Pope Saint Pius X always had a paternal affection for the Congregation of the SHMI, and granted the pontifical approval.

Frasinetti's last years were filled with pastoral and intellectual activities. Two more important writings came to light: "The Manual of the New Parish Priest", in which he shared his thirty years of pastoral experience, and "The Compendium of the Moral Theology of St. Alphonsus Maria de' Liguori", a summary of the morals of the famous Saint from Naples. The Compendium, which was adopted as manual of moral theology in many seminaries, was translated in several languages, and it is considered Fr. Joseph's most notable work. In the fall of 1865, Fr. Joseph launched the idea of a "House of Common Life" for poor boys with a vocation to the priesthood.

In late December 1867, fell ill with pneumonia, which caused his death, on January 2, 1868.

The community of the Sons of Holy Mary Immaculate of Common Life continued under Antonio Piccardo. After working hard for the promotion of diocesan and missionary vocations, the institute was transformed by him and his companions into the Congregation of the Sons of Holy Mary Immaculate. It was highly appreciated and encouraged by St. Pius X who, on May 21, 1904, granted the "Decretum Laudis", and made it a pontifical congregation. Ever since, the Congregation of the Sons of Holy Mary Immaculate is committed to promoting in the Church the legacy of Frasinetti. It is currently present in Italy, Argentina, Chile, the Philippines, Mexico and Poland.

Since 1965, there has existed in Sardinia an Institute of consecrated women, born from the inspiration of Joseph Battistella, called "Missionary Daughters of Holy Mary Immaculate" (Missionarie Figlie di Santa Maria Immacolata). It is a public association of diocesan right and a secular institute in formation which follows the spirituality of Frasinetti. It intends to promote, especially among the young people, the calling to virginity and to vocations of special consecration.

On May 14, 1991, the Church has recognized the virtues of Joseph Frasinetti, declaring him Venerable.
