= Carlo de' Vecchi =

Italian Roman Catholic prelate

Most Reverend Carlo de' Vecchi
- Titular Archbishop of Athenae; Bishop Emeritus of Chiusi
- Church: Catholic Church
- In office: 1667–1673
- Predecessor: Giacomo Altoviti
- Successor: Francesco Boccapaduli

Orders
- Ordination: December 1647
- Consecration: 15 March 1648 by Bernardino Spada

Personal details
- Born: 1611 Siena, Italy
- Died: 13 March 1673 (age 62)

Carlo de' Vecchi (1611 – 13 March 1673) was a Roman Catholic prelate who served as Titular Archbishop of Athenae (1667–1673) and Bishop of Chiusi (1648–1657).

== Biography ==
Carlo de' Vecchi was born in Siena, Italy in 1611. He held the degree of Doctor in utroque iure, and was a Referendary of the Tribunal of the Two Signatures.

He was ordained a priest in December 1647.

In 1644, he served as governor of Faenza.

On 2 March 1648, he was appointed Bishop of Chiusi by Pope Innocent X. On 15 March 1648, he was consecrated bishop by Bernardino Spada, Cardinal-Priest of San Pietro in Vincoli, with Alfonso Maurelli, Archbishop of Cosenza, and Giovanni Francesco Passionei, Bishop of Pesaro, serving as co-consecrators. He served as until his resignation on 12 March 1657.

On 27 April 1667, he was appointed Titular Archbishop of Athens (Greece) by Pope Clement IX. As titular Archbishop of Athens, De'Vecchi held the office of Secretary of the Sacred Congregation of Bishops and Regulars in the Roman Curia.

He held the title of Archbishop of Athens until his death on 13 March 1673.

== Episcopal succession ==
While bishop, he was the principal co-consecrator of:

- Celio Piccolomini, Titular Archbishop of Caesarea in Mauretania (1656);
- Volumnio Bandinelli, Titular Patriarch of Constantinople (1658);
- Giovanni Antonio Melzi, Archbishop of Capua (1661);
- Federico Martinotti (Martinozzi), Bishop of Sarsina (1661);
- Vitaliano Marescano, Bishop of Umbriatico (1661);
- Ferdinand von Furstenberg, Bishop of Paderborn (1661);
- Tommaso de Rosa, Bishop of Sant'Angelo dei Lombardi e Bisaccia (1662);
- Francesco Pannocchieschi d'Elci, Archbishop of Pisa (1663);
- Giacomo Franzoni, Bishop of Camerino (1666);
- Galeazzo Marescotti, Titular Archbishop of Corinthus (1668);
- Bernardino Rocci, Titular Archbishop of Damascus (1668);
- Agostino Premoli, Bishop of Concordia (1668); and
- Lorenzo Cibo, Bishop of Jesi (1672).

== External links and additional sources ==
- Cheney, David M. "Diocese of Chiusi e Pienza". Catholic-Hierarchy.org. (for Chronology of Bishops) ^{[self-published]}
- Chow, Gabriel. "Diocese of Chiusi (Italy)". GCatholic.org. (for Chronology of Bishops) ^{[self-published]}
- Cheney, David M. "Athenae (Titular See)". Catholic-Hierarchy.org. (for Chronology of Bishops) ^{[self-published]}
- Chow, Gabriel. "Archdiocese of Athens (Greece)". GCatholic.org. (for Chronology of Bishops) ^{[self-published]}

Catholic Church titles
Preceded by Ippolito Campioni	Bishop of Chiusi; 1648–1657	Succeeded by Alessandro Piccolomini
Preceded by Giacomo Altoviti	Titular Archbishop of Athenae; 1667–1673	Succeeded by Francesco Boccapaduli
