= Giovanni Battista Maremonti =

16th-century Roman Catholic bishop

Most Reverend Giovanni Battista Maremonti
- Bishop of Sora
- Church: Catholic Church
- Diocese: Diocese of Sora
- In office: 1577–1578
- Predecessor: Tommaso Gigli
- Successor: Orazio Ciceroni
- Previous posts: Auxiliary Bishop of Ravenna (1567–1577); Titular Bishop of Utica (1567–1577)

Personal details
- Died: 1578

Giovanni Battista Maremonti (died 1578) was a Roman Catholic prelate who served as Bishop of Sora (1577–1578), Auxiliary Bishop of Ravenna (1567–1577), and Titular Bishop of Utica (1567–1577).

== Biography ==
On 17 Mar 1567, Giovanni Battista Maremonti was appointed during the papacy of Pope Pius V as Titular Bishop of Utica and Auxiliary Bishop of Ravenna. On 14 Aug 1577, he was appointed during the papacy of Pope Gregory XIII as Bishop of Sora. He served as Bishop of Sora until his death in 1578.

While bishop, he was the principal consecrator of Lattanzio Lattanzi, Bishop of Pistoia (1576).

== External links and additional sources ==
- Cheney, David M. "Diocese of Sora-Cassino-Aquino-Portecorvino". Catholic-Hierarchy.org. (for Chronology of Bishops) ^{[self-published]}
- Chow, Gabriel. "Diocese of Sora-Cassino-Aquino-Portecorvino (Italy)". GCatholic.org. (for Chronology of Bishops) ^{[self-published]}

Catholic Church titles
Preceded by Marcantonio Oradino	Titular Bishop of Utica; 1567–1577	Succeeded by Felice Ambrosino
Preceded by	Auxiliary Bishop of Ravenna; 1567–1577	Succeeded by
Preceded by Tommaso Gigli	Bishop of Sora; 1577–1578	Succeeded by Orazio Ciceroni
