= Roman Catholic Diocese of Chiusi-Pienza =

Catholic diocese in Tuscany, Italy (until 1986)

The former Italian Catholic Diocese of Chiusi-Pienza, in Tuscany, existed until 1986. In that year it was united into the Diocese of Montepulciano-Chiusi-Pienza. The Diocese of Chiusi (Clusinus) was at first immediately subject to the Holy See, but was made a suffragan of archdiocese of Siena by Pope Pius II. From 1459 to 1986, it was a suffragan of the archdiocese of Siena.

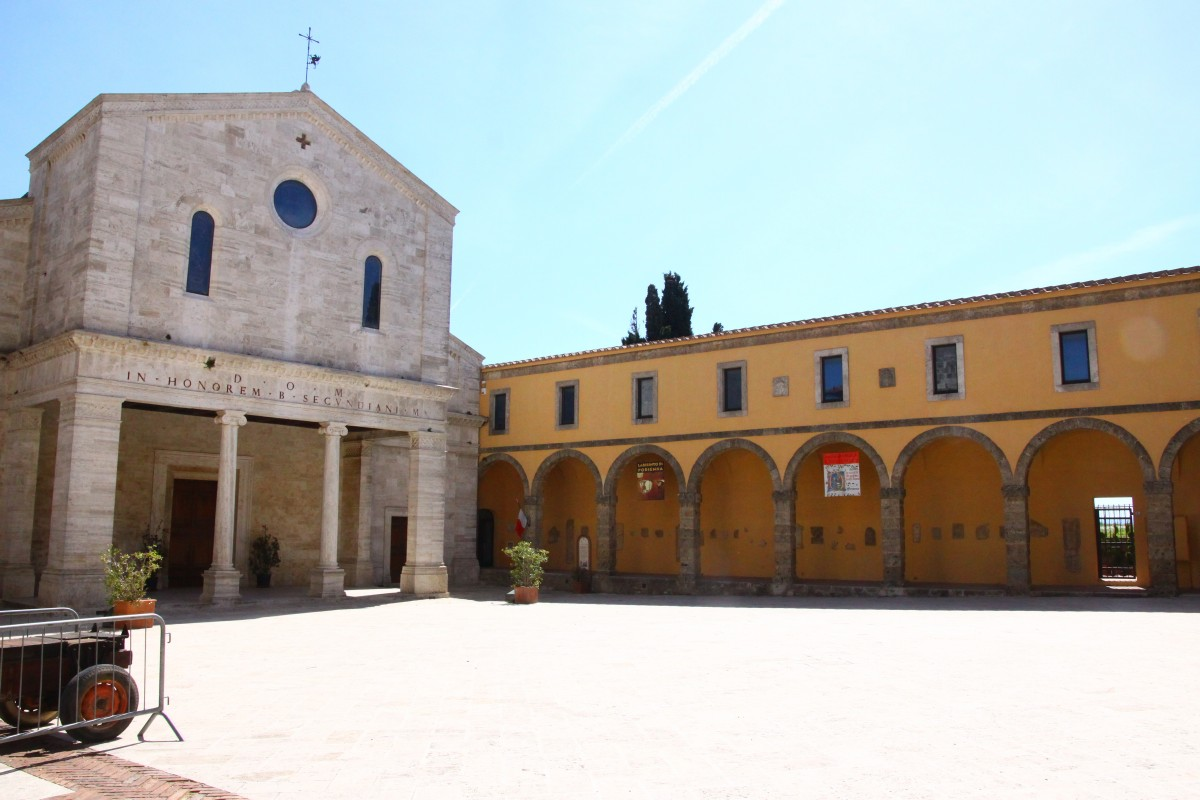
Chiusi, cathedral

== History ==
Catacombs are found at Chiusi. The martyrdom of the deacon Irenaeus and the virgin Mustiola probably took place under Valerian. The monastery of San Salvatore in Amiata was traditionally said to have been built by Ratchis, King of the Lombards, in 747. The foundation document, however, is a forgery. Afterwards the monastery rose to great power and influence.

Bishop Francesco degli Atti (1348) was a doctor of Canon Law, noted for his De quarta canonica piorum legatorum debita episcopo, a treatise on the 25% of a bishop's income which ought to be spent on charity.

Chiusi formerly boasted of a relic, the purported betrothal ring of the Blessed Virgin, which was taken to Perugia about 1449 by an Augustinian friar; in consequence of this a war broke out between them, in which Perugia was victorious and remained in possession of the ring. Pope Sixtus IV confiscated the ring, and had it brought to the Vatican, but Clement VIII returned it to Perugia. Two hundred years later, a wedding ring of the Virgin was being shown in Semur in Burgundy; another is preserved at S. Maria in via Lata in Rome; and another at the abbey of Anchin near Douai in France.

=== Chapter and cathedral ===
The cathedral of Chiusi was dedicated to S. Secundinus.

The cathedral was administered and served by a Chapter, originally composed of two dignities (the Provost and the Archpriest) and three Canons (canonici), along with four priests. The cathedral was a parish church, and the Archpriest and Provost were responsible for the parishioners' spiritual welfare. In 1620, there were the two dignities and eight Canons. Later two dignities were added (the Archdeacon and the Prior), and there were nine Canons and twelve beneficiati.

In 1584, Bishop Masseo Bardi, O.F.M. (1581–1597) held a diocesan synod, and published the constitutions agreed upon at the meeting. Bishop Lucio Borghesi (1682–1705) presided over a diocesan synod in Chiusi in 1684, and had its constitutions published. He held another synod in 1688.

=== Losses of territory ===
In 1325, when the new diocese of Cortona was erected, Pope John XXII obtained part of the territory of the new diocese from the territory of the diocese of Chiusi.

On 22 April 1459, Pope Pius II issued the bull "Triumphans Pastor", in which he raised the diocese of Siena to metropolitan status, and assigned to it as suffragans the dioceses of Soano, Chiusi, Massa, and Grosseto. On 13 August 1462, with the bull "Pro Excellenti", Pius II created a new diocese, the diocese of Pienza, with his native town as the seat of the bishop. Territory for the new diocese came in part from the diocese of Chiusi.

In the papal bull "In supereminenti" of 25 September 1600, Pope Clement VIII created the new diocese of Città di Pieve in Tuscany. The territory for the new diocese was taken from the dioceses of Perugia, Orvieto, the Papacy itself, and Chiusi ("Laviani, Pusteoli, Gioelle et Panigarolae cum caeteris locis in universo marchionatu Clusii" and Santa Flora). Pieve was raised to the status of a city (civitas), and its collegiate church of Ss. Gervasius and Protasius was raised to the rank of a cathedral. The bull mentions that Bishop Ludovico Martelli had recently died, which no doubt simplified the process envisioned by the Pope, since there would be no opposition or appeals from Chiusi. Pope Clement sent Magister Anselmo Dandini, his papal notary de numero participantium, who was also Referendary of the Two Signatures, as Commissary and Apostolic Visitor, to assess and arrange the divisions ("ad divisionem et assignationem fructuum, redituum et proventuum, ac bonorum huiusmodi procedens"). Pope Clement issued a second bull, "Super Universas", on 9 November 1601, in which he rehearsed all his orders from the first bull, ratified the arrangements made by Magister Dandini, and issued additional instructions for the organization of the diocese of Città di Pieve. In compensation for its losses, the episcopal revenues of Chiusi were to receive an annual payment of 1,000 scudi. Chiusi finally received a new bishop, Fausto Mellari, on 22 April 1602.

In the bull of 1 June 1772, preliminary to uniting the two dioceses of Chiusi and Pienza under one bishop, aeque personaliter, Pope Clement XIV removed four parishes from the diocese of Chiusi, Arcidorro, Monticello, Montelaterone and Casteldel Piano, transferring them to the diocese of Montalcino. On 15 June 1772, in the bull "Quemadmodum", Pope Clement united the dioceses of Chiusi and Pienza.

=== Amalgamation ===
On 15 June 1772, in the bull "Quemadmodum", Pope Clement united the dioceses of Chiusi and Pienza.

On 18 February 1984, the Vatican and the Italian State signed a new and revised concordat. Based on the revisions, a set of Normae was issued on 15 November 1984, which was accompanied in the next year, on 3 June 1985, by enabling legislation. According to the agreement, the practice of having one bishop govern two separate dioceses at the same time, aeque personaliter, was abolished. This applied to the diocese of Chiusi e Pienza. Instead, the Vatican continued consultations which had begun under Pope John XXIII for the merging of small dioceses, especially those with personnel and financial problems, into one combined diocese. On 30 September 1986, Pope John Paul II ordered that the dioceses of Montepulciano, Chiusi and Pienza be merged into one diocese with one bishop, with the Latin title Dioecesis Montis Politiani-Clusina-Pientina. The seat of the diocese was to be in Moontepulciano, and was to serve as the cathedral of the merged diocese. The cathedrals in Chiusi and Pienza were to become co-cathedrals, and the cathedral Chapters were each to be a Capitulum Concathedralis. There was to be only one diocesan Tribunal, in Montepulciano, and likewise one seminary, one College of Consultors, and one Priests' Council. The territory of the new diocese was to include the territory of the former dioceses of Chiusi and Pienza, and was suffragan to the archdiocese of Siena.

== Bishops of Chiusi ==
=== to 1200 ===
...

- Lucius Petronius Dexter (d. 322)

...
[Florentius (465)]
...

- Florentinus (attested 558–560)

...

- Ecclesius (attested 600, 604)

...

- Marcellinus (attested 649)

...

- Theodorus (attested 676, 680)

...

- Arcadius (attested 729–743)
- Gisolfus (attested 752)

...

- Andreas (attested 826)
- Theobaldus (attested 835, 845)
- Taceprandus (c. 850, 853)
- Liutprandus (attested 861)

...

- Christianus (attested 911)

...

- Liutto (attested 967, 968)

...

- Arialdus (attested 998–1007, 1021 or later)

...

- Wido (Guido) (attested 1027–1038)

...

- Petrus (attested 1049)
- Wido (attested 1055)
- Petrus (attested 1058)
- Joannes (attested 1059)
- Lanfranc (attested 1065–1098)

...

- Petrus (attested 1112–1127)

...

- Martinus (attested 1146–1147)

...

- Ubertus (attested 1159)

...

- Rainerius (attested 1176)
- Leo (attested 1179)
- Theobaldus (attested 1191–1196)

...

=== 1200 to 1500 ===
- Gualfredus (attested 1200–1215)
- Hermannus (attested 1215–1230)
- Pisanus (attested 1235, 1237)
- Gratianus ( ? –1245)
- Frigerius (attested 1245–1248)
- Petrus (attested 1250)
- Rainerius
- Petrus (1273–1299)
- Massaeus de' Medici, O.P. (1299-1316)
- Matteo Orsini, O.Min. (1317–1322)

Leonardus (1322–1327) Administrator

- Rainerius, O.S.B.Vallisumb. (1327–1343)
- Angelo (1343–1348)
- Francesco degli Atti (1348–1353)
- Biagio, O.Cist. (1353–1357)
- Biagio di San Gemino (Geminelli) (1357–1386?)
- Jacobus de Tolomaei, O.Min. (1383–1384) Roman Obedience
- Clemente Cennino (1384–1388?)
- Matthaeus (1388–1393) Roman Obedience
- Adoardo Michelozzi, O.Min. (1393–1404)
- Antonio, O.S.B. (1404–1410 Deposed) Roman Obedience
- Biagio Hermanni (1410–1418) Pisan Obedience
- Pietro Paolo Bertini (1418–1437)
- Alessio de Cesari (7 Jan 1437 –1462)
- Giovanni Chinugi (1462–1463)
- Gabriele Piccolomini (1463–1483)
- Lorenzo Mancini (1483–1490?)
- Antonio (1490–1497)
- Sinulfo di Castel Lotario (1497–1503)

...

=== 1500 to 1800 ===
- Bonifacio di Castel Lotario (8 Feb 1503 – 1504)
- Niccolò Bonafede (1504–1533)
- Bartolomeo Ferratini (14 Jan 1534 – Jun 1534)
- Gregorio Magalotti (1534–1537)
- Giorgio Andreasi (1538–1544)

Cardinal Bartolomeo Guidiccioni (1544–1545) Administrator

- Giovanni Ricci (1545 – 19 Nov 1554 Resigned)
- Figliuccio de Figliucci (19 Nov 1554 – 1558)
- Salvatore Pacini (1558–1581)
- Masseo Bardi, O.F.M. (29 May 1581 – 1597)
- Ludovico Martelli (1597–1600)
- Fausto Malari (Molari, Mellari) (22 Apr 1602 – 1608)
- Orazio Spannocchi (1609–1620)
- Alfonso Petrucci (1620–1633)
- Giovanni Battista Piccolomini (20 Jun 1633 – 14 Jul 1637)
- Ippolito Campioni, O.S.B. (14 Dec 1637 – 27 Jan 1647)
- Carlo de' Vecchi (2 Mar 1648 – 12 Mar 1657 Resigned)
- Alessandro Piccolomini (12 Mar 1657 – 6 Nov 1661)
- Marco Antonio Marescotti (1664–1681)
- Lucio Borghesi (25 May 1682 – 31 Jul 1705)
- Gaetano Maria Bargagli, O.S.B. (22 Feb 1706 – 30 Jun 1729)
- Giovanni Battista Tarugi (23 Dec 1729 – 14 Sep 1735)
- Pio Magnoni (9 Jul 1736 –1747)
- Giustino Girolamo Bagnesi, O.S.B. (15 Jul 1748 – Jan 1775)
- Giuseppe Pannilini (1775–1823)

=== Diocese of Chiusi e Pienza ===
United: 15 June 1772 with the Diocese of Pienza
Pienza was immediately Subject to the Holy See

- Giacinto Pippi (1824–1839)
- Giovanni Battista Ciofi (1843–1870)
- Raffaele Bianchi (1872–1889 Resigned)
- Giacomo Bellucci (30 Dec 1889 – 19 Feb 1917)
- Giuseppe Conti (22 Mar 1917 – 24 Apr 1941)
- Carlo Baldini, O.M.D. (31 Jul 1941 – 2 Jan 1970)
- Alberto Giglioli (7 Oct 1975 – 30 Sep 1986 Appointed, Bishop of Montepulciano-Chiusi-Pienza)

30 September 1986: United with the Diocese of Montepulciano to form the Diocese of Montepulciano-Chiusi-Pienza

== See also ==
- List of Catholic dioceses in Italy

== Books ==
- Gams, Pius Bonifatius (1873). Series episcoporum Ecclesiae catholicae: quotquot innotuerunt a beato Petro apostolo. Ratisbon: Typis et Sumptibus Georgii Josephi Manz. p. 753-754. (Use with caution; obsolete)
- Eubel, Conradus, ed. (1913). Hierarchia catholica (in Latin). Vol. Tomus 1 (second ed.). Münster: Libreria Regensbergiana.
- Eubel, Conradus, ed. (1914). Hierarchia catholica (in Latin). Vol. Tomus 2 (second ed.). Münster: Libreria Regensbergiana.
- Eubel, Conradus; Gulik, Guilelmus, eds. (1923). Hierarchia catholica (in Latin). Vol. Tomus 3 (second ed.). Münster: Libreria Regensbergiana.
- Gauchat, Patritius (Patrice) (1935). Hierarchia catholica (in Latin). Vol. Tomus IV (1592-1667). Münster: Libraria Regensbergiana.
- Ritzler, Remigius; Sefrin, Pirminus (1952). Hierarchia catholica medii et recentis aevi (in Latin). Vol. Tomus V (1667-1730). Patavii: Messagero di S. Antonio.
- Ritzler, Remigius; Sefrin, Pirminus (1958). Hierarchia catholica medii et recentis aevi. Vol. Tomus VI (1730-1799). Patavii: Messagero di S. Antonio.
- Ritzler, Remigius; Sefrin, Pirminus (1968). Hierarchia Catholica medii et recentioris aevi (in Latin). Vol. VII (1800–1846). Monasterii: Libreria Regensburgiana.
- Remigius Ritzler; Pirminus Sefrin (1978). Hierarchia catholica Medii et recentioris aevi (in Latin). Vol. VIII (1846–1903). Il Messaggero di S. Antonio.
- Pięta, Zenon (2002). Hierarchia catholica medii et recentioris aevi (in Latin). Vol. IX (1903–1922). Padua: Messagero di San Antonio. ISBN 978-88-250-1000-8.

=== Studies ===
- Barni, Enrico; Bersotti, Giacomo (1999). La Diocesi di Chiusi. Chiusi: Edizioni Luì. (in Italian)
- Cappelletti, Giuseppe (1862). Le chiese d'Italia dalla loro origine sino ai nostri giorni (in Italian). Vol. decimosettimo. Venezia: Antonelli. pp. 561–632.
- Kehr, Paul Fridolin (1908). Italia pontificia. vol. III. Berlin 1908. pp. 231–251. (in Latin)
- Lanzoni, Francesco (1927). Le diocesi d'Italia dalle origini al principio del secolo VII (an. 604). Faenza: F. Lega. pp. 552–554.(in Italian)
- Schwartz, Gerhard (1913), Die Besetzung der Bistümer Reichsitaliens unter den sächsischen und salischen Kaisern : mit den Listen der Bischöfe, 951-1122, Leipzig-Berlin 1913, pp. 262–263 (Roselle). (in German)
- Ughelli, Ferdinando; Coleti, Nicolo (1718). Italia sacra sive de Episcopis Italiae, et insularum adjacentium (in Latin). Vol. Tomus tertius (secunda ed.). Venice: Apud Sebastianum Coleti. pp. 585–654.
