= Niccolò Bonafede =

Italian Roman Catholic bishop

Most Reverend Niccolò Bonafede
- Bishop of Chiusi
- Church: Catholic Church
- Diocese: Diocese of Chiusi
- In office: 1504–1533
- Predecessor: Bonifacio di Castel Lotario
- Successor: Bartolomeo Ferratini

Personal details
- Born: c.1464 Monte San Giusto
- Died: 1533 Monte San Giusto
- Children: Camillo
- Education: Capranica (Rome); Sapienza (Rome); Perugia

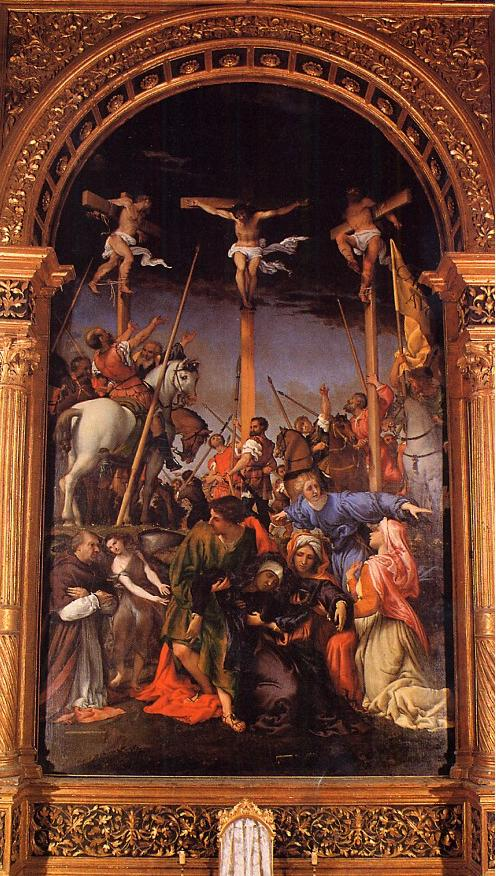
Lorenzo Lotto, Crucifixion (1531), commissioned by Bishop Bonafede, who appears at the lower left

Niccolò Bonafede (c. 1464–1533) was a Roman Catholic prelate who served as Bishop of Chiusi (1504–1533).

== Birth and family ==
Niccolò Bonafede was born at (Monte) San Giusto in the diocese of Fermo in the March of Ancona c. 1464.

The family of Niccolò Bonafede was established in San Giusto by the late 14th century. His great-grandfather had been Podestà of the town several times. Niccolò was the son of Tommaso Bonafede and Giacoma de' Rasci. He had a brother, Pier Matteo Bonafede, and a son, Camillo.

Because of a criminal prosecution laid against Tommaso by a malicious monk Gregory, Tommaso was able to form a relationship with his judge, Cardinal Filippo Calandrini, the brother of Pope Nicholas V and papal Legate of the Marches (1449–1452). Through Calandrini he also enjoyed the patronage of the two Capranica cardinals, Domenico and Angelo.

== Education ==
At the age of eighteen, young Niccolò went to Rome, and enrolled at the Collegio Capranica, which had been founded by Cardinal Domenico Capranica, with free tuition for seven years for thirty-six students of philosophy, theology, and Canon Law. The students elected their own student rector, and Niccolò was soon chosen for that post. He conducted a suit on behalf of the students against the Guardians of the Ospedale di San Giovanni, who were protectors of the Capranica, but engaged in maladministration and tyranny. During the proceedings he was introduced to Girolamo Calgrano, a Privy Chamberlain of Pope Innocent VIII (1484–1492), who brought him to the Pope where he was allowed to plead his case. Innocent was so impressed that he appointed Calgrano to hear the case officially and give summary judgment. An appeal was made by the Guardians, which was heard by Cardinal Piccolomini, and decided in favor of the Capranica.

== Doctorate and early employment ==
Due to the diseases prevalent in Rome, collectively called the mal aerea, Niccolò transferred to the University of Perugia. A consideration in his decision might have been the vendetta murder carried out recently by his brother Pier Matteo. He obtained the degree of Doctor in utroque iure, and joined the college of consistorial advocates in the Roman Curia. In 1492, he obtained a post as Auditor of Pope Alexander VI's nephew, Juan Castellar, who was a Protonotary Apostolic. When Castellar became Archbishop of Trani in August 1493, Bonafede was sent to Trani as the Archbishop's Vicar General. He conducted his business with considerable severity, arousing the distaste of King Ferdinand. Niccolò had to make the trip to Naples, seek an audience, and make his explanations. Ferdinand died on 24 January 1494, and Bonafede thought it best to leave the kingdom and take counsel with Castellar, who was also governor of Perugia

In Perugia, Castellar was involved in a dispute with the Baglione family, and when they appealed to Rome, Castellar sent Niccolò Bonafede to represent him before the Pope. Niccolò was successful, and Pope Alexander was so taken with him that he decided to retain him in papal service, and appointed him a papal chamberlain (cubicularius) (1494). A few months later, Niccolò submitted a petition, asking to be named to the papal chapel; instead, Pope Alexander named him a Protonotary Apostolic, and dispensed him from having to pay the usual fees.

At the beginning of 1496, Bonafede was appointed governor of the city of Tivoli. He entered Tivoli on 10 February, and remained there for around two years. His tenure was plagued by foreign soldiers, as well as troops of the Orsini and of the Colonna. The Orsini made war against the Pope, and in January 1497 captured Guidobaldo da Montefeltro, the Duke of Urbino and captain general of the papal army. Bonafede led a troop of fifty cavalry against the Orsini properties around Vicovaro in punishment. Pope Alexander was so delighted that he appointed Niccolò his ambassador to Venice.

Bonafede arrived in Venice on 3 January 1498, and remained there for twelve months, to the satisfaction of both the Signoria of the Serene Republic and Pope Alexander VI, no easy task. After a short rest and recuperation in his native land, he returned to Rome, where he was immediately assigned, on 15 January 1499, to be governor of Benevento, which was being attacked and subverted by agents of King Ferdinando of Naples. He arrived there on 11 February 1499, and held the position until mid-1501. He was not actually in Benevento for long. In the late summer of 1499, Pope Alexander decided to take advantage of the troubles in Lombardy brought about by the expulsion of Ludovico Sforza from Milan, and the invasion of King Louis XII of France to aid the Milanese against him, but also because Louis intended to pursue his family's claims to the crown of Naples. To assist Cesare Borgia in the Pope's plan to reclaim the Duchy of Urbino and the lordship of Camerino, Bonafede was summoned to become Commissary General of the papal forces. After the surrender of Camerino in July 1502, Cesare, with a papal mandate, appointed Bonafede governor of Forlì (1502–1503). In a meeting with the Pope and Cesare in July 1503, the Pope decided to name Niccolò governor of Siena and Commissary General of all papal troops in Italy, and, when the Bishop of Pesaro died, the Pope proposed giving Bonafede the bishopric. Unfortunately, Pope Alexander died on 18 August 1503, nullifying all these arrangements.

== New pope, new patron ==
Cesare Borgia was left to defend the interests of the family and his own position, as well as to produce a new pope who would be friendly to the Spanish cause. He was, however, stricken by the same malady, said to have been poison (by Guicciardini and others) but more likely to have been malaria, and was prostrate, rather that abroad and active. Bonafede counselled withdrawal from Rome, to avoid being trapped by the troops of both the Orsini and the Colonna; but Cesare was unwilling, and Bonafede became a negotiator with the Spanish cardinals and other potential supporters.

In the Conclave which followed, Bonafede participated as a conclavist of Cardinal Francesco de Loris, the Archbishop of Constantinople. He is said to have worked to assemble the votes which eventually elected Cardinal Francesco Piccolomini. The new Pope, Pius III, elected on 22 September 1503, was quite familiar with Niccolò. Eight days after his election, he summoned Bonafede, and praised him highly for his conduct in his various appointments. He then announced that he intended to appoint him Governor of Rome. Unfortunately, Pius III died on 18 October 1503, after only twenty-six days in office, and all appointments lapsed. During the Conclave of October 1503, the Governor of the city was Johannes de Sacchis, Bishop of Ragusa (1490–1505).

== High offices ==
In the second conclave, on 1 November 1503, Cardinal Giuliano della Rovere was elected Pope Julius II by acclamation. On 19 November Cesare Borgia left Rome permanently, heading for France. Three weeks after his election, on 21 November, Pope Julius named Niccolò Bonafede Vice-Chamberlain and Governor of Rome.

=== Governor of Rome ===
He was Vice-Chamberlain of the Apostolic Camera (Treasury) and governor of the city of Rome from 21 November 1503 to April 1505. His first large project was to disarm the violent part of the population of the city. Pope Julius predicted that he would fail, if only because of the lack of cooperation of the cardinals and nobles, many of whom kept small armies of retainers. Bonafede persisted, sending more than 200 offenders to prison, and 300 to the galleys, but his project came to nothing.

=== Bishop of Chiusi ===
On 20 June 1504, Niccolò Bonafede was appointed Bishop of Chiusi by Pope Julius II. The office was greatly desired by Cardinal Pietro Isvalies, Archbishop of Reggio Calabria, for one of his familiars, and he offered the exchange of one of his benefices in the Roman Curia. But Pope Julius paid no attention. At the same time, Julius granted Bonafede full possession of the parish church of S. Maria in Telusiano in Niccolò's home town of San Giusto. He continued to work in Rome however. The strain of the heavy work load of a conscious man began to undermine Niccolò's health. His constant fatigue led to sciatica, and he developed "podagra" (gout) in his knees. For four months he was unable to carry out the duties of his office, as the principal administrator and civil judge of the city, as the second highest official of the Apostolic Treasury, after the Cardinal Camerlengo, and as a regular attendant and advisor at papal consistories. His doctors predicted he would live only six months if he stayed in Rome. With papal consent, and by his own agreement, he retired from Rome to Chiusi, where it took him eight months to recover his health.

When Pope Julius heard of his recovery, he summoned him to Rome, and in 1506 appointed him governor of Forlì. Bonafede resisted going, but Julius eventually compelled him. He was paid 100 ducats in gold per month for his salary, and, before departing, obtained permission from the Pope to read all his papers concerning Forlì so that he could understand the Pope's wishes and goals. On arrival in Forlì, his first action was to give armed men four days to leave the city. He also recalled exiles. He then began dealing with political troublemakers, followers as well as opponents of the Pope. Julius was incensed, and the Cardinal of Pavia, Francesco Alidosi, quickly wrote Niccolò a folio-length letter in his own hand advising Bonafede to capitulate to the Pope's wishes and try to placate him. Julius was persuaded to appoint him Commissary General for his Bolognese campaign, and replace him in Forlì with the Bishop of Amelia, Giustiniano de' Moriconi. Bonafede returned to Rome

=== Bologna ===
During the Bolognese campaign Bonafede accompanied the Pope to Orvieto, then to Perugia, and then into the Romagna to Imola. As one Bolognese fortress after another fell to papal troops, led by the Duke of Urbino, the Bentivogli evacuated Bologna and the Pope and Bonafede entered the city on 11 November 1506. In February 1507, Pope Julius went off to Imola to inspect its fortifications; he arrived there on 22 February. Niccolò followed along, and in an interview managed to persuade the Pope (who wanted him to serve as Vice-Legate of Bologna) to allow him to return home to San Giusto. He spent a year there working on the building of his family palace, and then returned to his diocese of Chiusi.

In September 1510, Pope Julius decided to deal with the Duke of Ferrara, an ally of the French, who was in occupation of territory in the Romagna which the Pope considered as belonging to the Roman Church. In addition, Duke Alfonso was attempting to seize territory from Bologna. Pope Julius sent word to Bonafede to meet him in Bologna, where he arrived on 22 September. Julius immediately appointed Niccolò governor of Modena, where he was challenged by the forces of Marc'Antonio Colonna, who was in the service of Milan. The Pope sent the Duke of Urbino and papal forces to repel the incursion. The commissaries of the papal army, however, were little better than robbers, and managed to alienate the angry population from the papal cause. Bonafede had the Pope replace the papal officials. He himself caught one of the debilitating fevers that infected most armies of the time. Bonafede held the governorship for six months. Since the Cardinal of Pavia, who was Legate of Bologna, was politically unreliable and a notable simoniac, Pope Julius intended to take him with him back to Rome, leaving Niccolò Bonafede as governor of Bologna and Governor General of the entire Romagna. When Julius moved to Ravenna, on 23 May 1511, the French commander Giacomo Trivulzio entered Bologna. An intense debate immediately ensued among the Bolognese, as to whether to turn over the Governor, Niccolô Bonafede. After two days, the French withdrew from Bologna without any resolution of the situation, and two days after that Bonafede was restored to his governorship by the Bolognese. When King Louis XII arrived in the neighborhood of Bologna, several of Bonafede's friends among the cardinals advised him to flee the city, but he refused, pointing out that the Bolognese had taken great risks to save him from Trivulzio, and stealing away would be a serious mistake; only if he were promoted to a high office in Rome could he depart, something Julius was not prepared to do; Bonafede then demanded instead to be reconfirmed as governor. The Pope then wrote to Bonafede, ordering him to leave Bologna under threat of suspension from his benefices. After some recriminations between Bonafede, the papal Legate, and the government of Bologna, Bonafede obeyed. He returned to his home in San Giusto. Pope Julius II died on 21 February 1513.

=== San Giusto ===
In 1513, Niccolò completed a palace which he had been building since before 1504 in San Giusto. The principal façade has an inscription, "Nicolò Bonafede, Distinguished and Experienced Man, Bishop of Chiusi, having discharged with great distinction military missions for the Apostolic See, most recently against the French, and the governorship of a great many provinces [including] Bologna and Rome, has erected this house for his own repose and for the advantage of [his] descendants, and having demolished the little dwellings, he decorated [the palace] with attractive brickwork in the distinguished piazza, 23 October 1513.

In 1519, Bonafede was recalled by Pope Leo X from his retirement in San Giusto, on the advice of Cardinal Giuliano de'Medici, Cardinal Francesco Armellino the Legate of the Marches, and others, and again named Commissary General of the papal army in the Marches. On 20 March 1520, his forces killed Ludovico Euffreducci (Freduccio), the tyrant of Fermo. During his administration he reformed the governments of Fermo, Loreto, Osimo, and Ascoli. His actions, however, were looked on jealously by the Orsini faction, who had been supporters of Ludovico Euffreducci, and with the assistance of the Pope's sister, they determined to end Bonafede's tenure, and replace him with the bishop of Rimini, Fabio Cerri. Bonafede was summoned to Rome for "consultations' with the Pope, and the Bishop of Rimini, Vice-Legate of the March took over his functions. After a welcoming interview, Niccolò heard nothing from the Pope for the next ten days. A second interview brought complements, but also a narration of the complaints of the Orsini faction. Three days later, Bonafede left Rome for Florence, to consult with Cardinal de'Medici. Bonafede was finally offered the commission of reforming Perugia. When this was completed, he visited the shrine of Loreto and then returned home.

In 1523–1524, Bishop Bonafede was employed by Pope Adrian VI as Vice-Legate of the Marches and the Romandiola, in recovering territory in the Marches from the aggressive Pandolfo Malatesta, whom he defeated in battle. He proudly commemorated the achievement in an inscription on his palace in San Giusto.

Niccolò Bonafede died in San Giusto on 6 January 1534 (which was still the year 1533 in calendars that counted March 25 as New Year's Day.) He was buried in his church of S. Maria della Pietà in San Giusto, in a tomb which he himself had erected.

In the "Crucifixion" of Lorenzo Lotto (1531), which was commissioned by Bishop Bonafede and which hangs in the church of S. Maria in Monte San Giusto, the bishop is depicted kneeling at the lower left.

== Books and articles ==
- Georgio Viviano Marchese Buonaccorsi (1751). Antichità ... del Protonotariato Appostolico partecipante (in Italian). Faenza: Berecetti. p. 237.
- Leopardi, Monaldo (1832). Vita di Niccolo Bonafede: vescovo di Chiusi e officiale nella corte Romana dai tempi di Alessandro VI ai tempi di Clemente VII (in Italian). Pesaro: Annesio Nobili.
- Matthew, Louisa C. (1993). "«Patria», papal service and patronage: Nicolò Bonafede at Monte San Giusto in the Marches." Renaissance Studies, Vol. 7, No. 2 (June 1993), pp. 184–206.
- del Re, Niccolò (1972). Monsignor governatore di Roma (in Italian). Roma: Istituto di studi romani. p. 72. ISBN 9788873111382.
- Turchini, Angelo (2006). La legazione di Romagna e i suoi archivi: secoli XVI-XVIII (in Italian). Cesena (Forlì): Il ponte vecchio. p. 897. ISBN 978-88-8312-614-7.

== External links and additional sources ==
- Cheney, David M. "Diocese of Chiusi e Pienza". Catholic-Hierarchy.org. (for Chronology of Bishops) ^{[self-published]}
- Chow, Gabriel. "Diocese of Chiusi (Italy)". GCatholic.org. (for Chronology of Bishops) ^{[self-published]}

Catholic Church titles
Preceded by Bonifacio di Castel Lotario	Bishop of Chiusi; 1504–1533	Succeeded by Bartolomeo Ferratini
