= Chris Lattanzio =

American painter

Chris Lattanzio (born 1963) is an American artist based in Dallas, Texas.

His work, Spirit of the Downhill Skier, was included in the official United States Olympic Committee collection of the 2006 Winter Olympics commemorative art pieces. His 3-D line works, a form of low relief that is the exact opposite of an etching where everything else is taken away and only the lines are carved out and raise from the surface, have also been exhibited at the Supperclub in San Francisco and were included in a fund-raising event by Home Away from Homeless in 2006.

Lattanzio's 2007 Nobel Portraits for a Noble Building features 51 faces of all the Nobel Prize–winning scientists from the Bay Area (Stanford, UC Berkeley and UCSF), along with the largest wood portrait of Buddha in the United States, measuring 25 ft (7.6 m) feet tall by 20 ft (6.1 m) feet wide. His work is included in Wareham Development's Emeryville Station East (5885 Hollis Avenue in downtown Emeryville, California), an alternative fuel research center.

Beginning in 2008, Lattanzio began painting with light. The lights bleed into the ambient space surrounding the art itself; the LED lights and the space the lights illuminate, create a pictorial wall space. His personalized 3-D line art, combines with light, creating an interplay of colors and shadows.

Lattanzio's metal sculpture, Yellow rose of Texas, won second place in the inaugural Henderson Art Project in 2010
