= Sons of Holy Mary Immaculate =

Roman Catholic male religious institution

Congregation of the Sons of Holy Mary Immaculate
- Congregátio Filiórum Sanctæ Maríæ Immaculatæ (Latin)
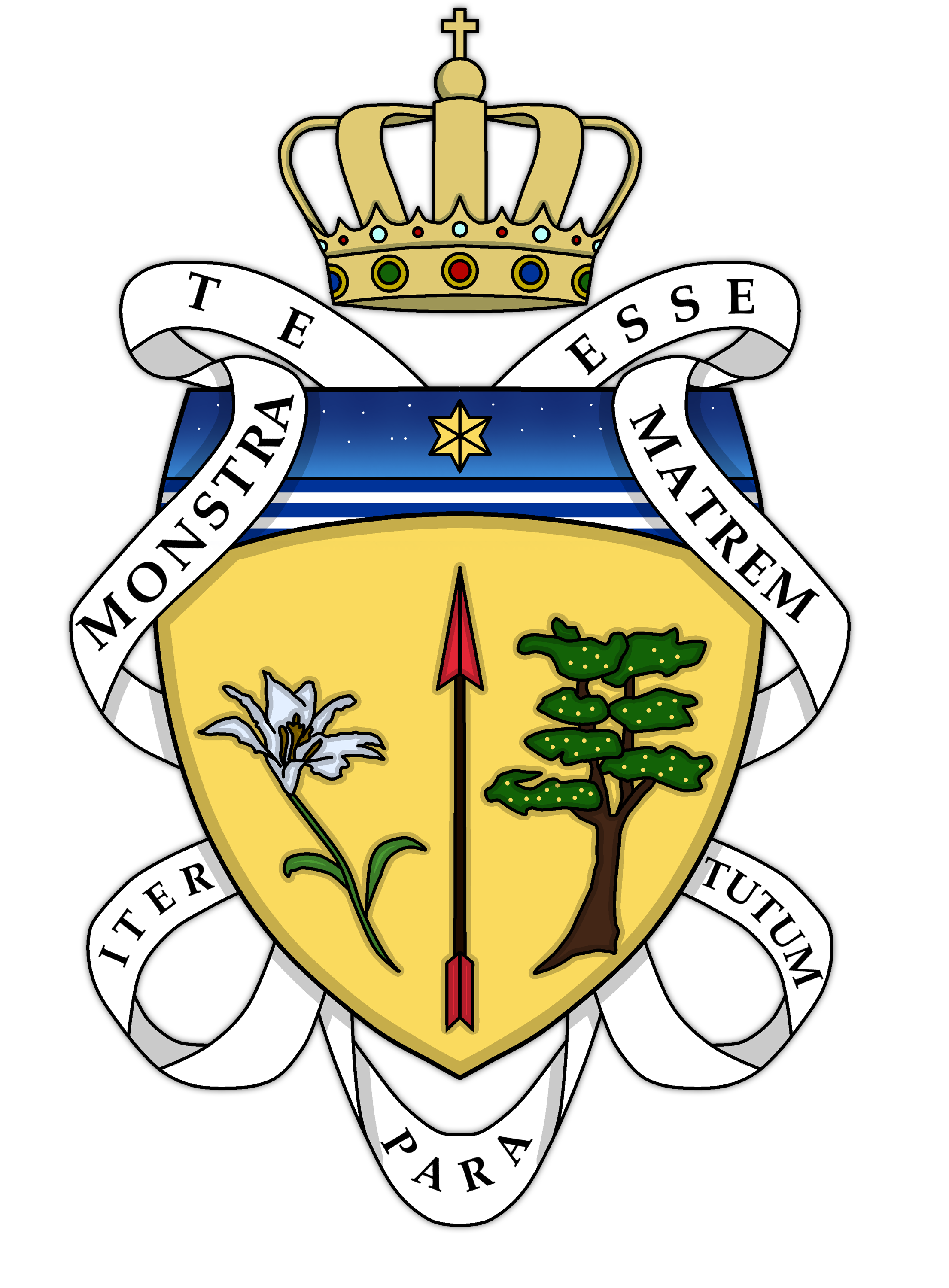
- The coat of arms of the Congregation: the white lily, arrow, ash tree, golden crown, and blue horizon with the words ''MONSTRA TE ESSE MATREM" and "ITER PARA TUTUM".
- Abbreviation: SHMI, FSMI
- Formation: 1861 (founded); 14 January 1866 (started accepting aspirants); 8 December 1903 (started as a Congregation); 21 May 1904 (of pontifical right)
- Founder: Venerable Joseph Frassinetti
- Founded at: Genoa, Italy
- Headquarters: Via del Mascherone 55, 00176 Rome, Italy
- Motto: Monstra Te esse Matrem. Iter para tutum. (Latin for 'Show Yourself to be a Mother. Prepare a Safe Way')
- Superior General: Fr. Mario Roncella, SHMI
- Patron Saints: Mary Immaculate; Saint Joseph; Pope Saint Pius X
- Parent organization: Catholic Church
- Website: www.congregazionefsmi.com

The Sons of Holy Mary Immaculate (in Latin: Congregátio Filiórum Sanctæ Maríæ Immaculátæ; in Italian: Figli di Santa Maria Immacolata) is a male religious institute of pontifical right: the members of this clerical congregation is also known with the acronym SHMI or FSMI.

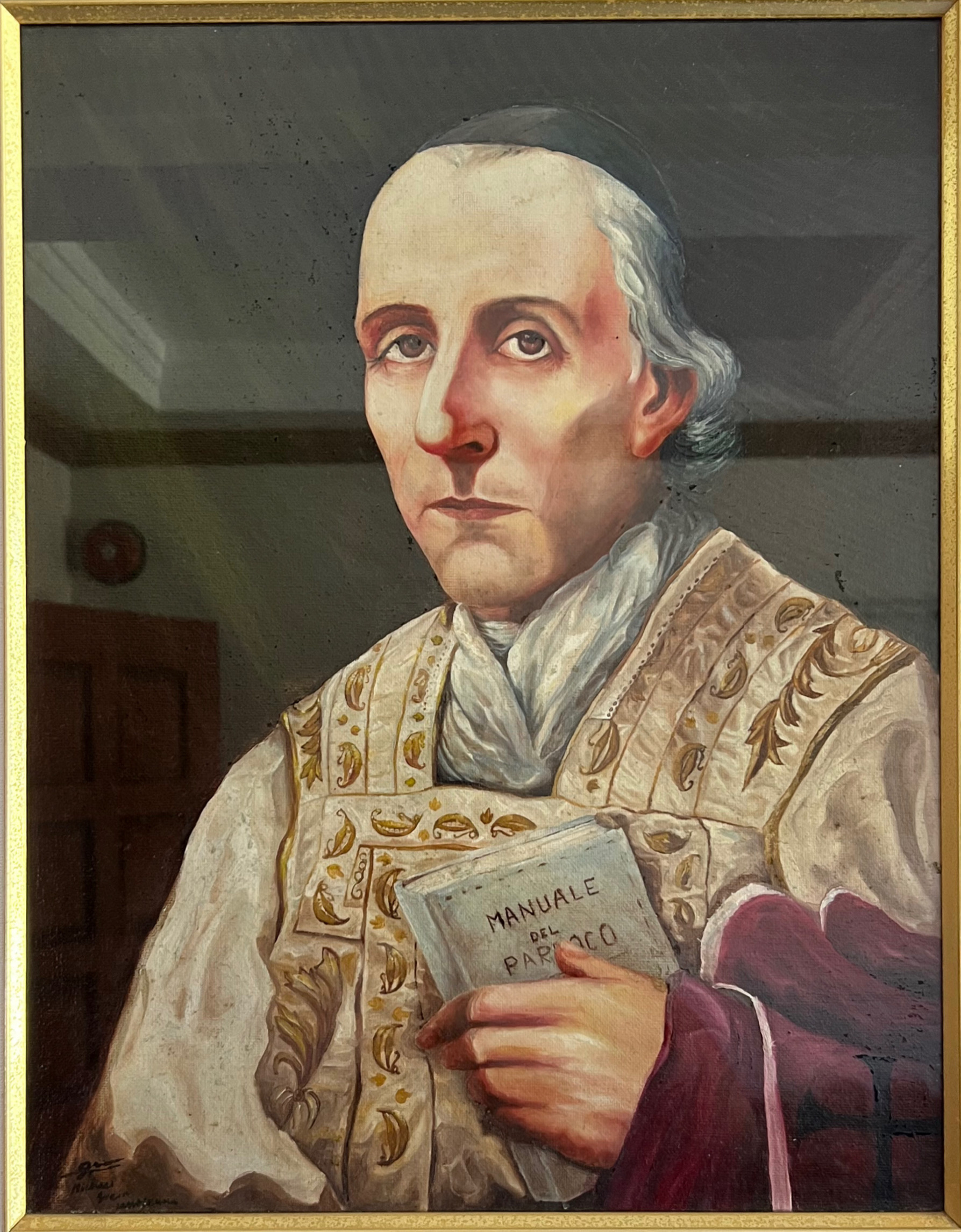
Venerable Joseph Frassinetti, the founder of the Congregation

== History ==
The congregation originates from a pious union of three young devotees to the Immaculate Conception, founded in Genoa in 1861 by the priest Giuseppe Frassinetti (1804–1868), prior of Santa Sabina: the members of the fraternity, after a pilgrimage to the Santuario della Madonnetta, on 14 January 1866, they began to lead a common life and welcomed young aspirants to the priesthood into their home without the financial means to support their studies.

The fraternity received new impetus from the direction of Antonio Piccardo, Frassinetti's successor, and the Sons of Holy Mary Immaculate was established as a congregation only on 8 December 1903.

The institute, of pontifical right since 21 May 1904, received definitive approval from the Holy See on 4 June 1910 and its constitutions on 17 May 1931.

== Activities and apostolate ==
The religious of the congregation are dedicated to the education of youth and the promotion of religious vocations. They are also active in missionary work.

In addition to Italy, they are present in Latin America (Argentina, Chile and Mexico), Poland, and the Philippines. The general headquarters is in Rome.
