= Lucio Borghesi =

Roman Catholic prelate

Most Reverend Lucio Borghesi
- Bishop of Chiusi
- Church: Catholic Church
- In office: 1682–1705
- Predecessor: Marco Antonio Marescotti
- Successor: Gaetano Maria Bargagli

Personal details
- Born: 1642 Siena, Italy
- Died: 31 Jul 1705 (age 62)

Lucio Borghesi (1642–1705) was a Roman Catholic prelate who served as Bishop of Chiusi (1682–1705).

== Biography ==
Lucio Borghesi was born in 1642 in Siena, Italy.

He held the degree of Doctor in utroque iure from the University of Siena. He served as majordomo (Praefectus cubiculi) of Cardinal Innico Caraccioli, the Archbishop of Naples (1667–1675).

On 25 May 1682, Pope Innocent XI appointed him Bishop of Chiusi. He served as Bishop of Chiusi until his death on 31 Jul 1705.

== External links and additional sources ==
- Cheney, David M. "Diocese of Chiusi e Pienza". Catholic-Hierarchy.org. (for Chronology of Bishops) ^{[self-published]}
- Chow, Gabriel. "Diocese of Chiusi (Italy)". GCatholic.org. (for Chronology of Bishops) ^{[self-published]}

Catholic Church titles
Preceded by Marco Antonio Marescotti	Bishop of Chiusi; 1682–1705)	Succeeded by Gaetano Maria Bargagli
