= Lattanzio Lattanzi =

16th-century Roman Catholic bishop

Most Reverend Lattanzio Lattanzi
- Bishop of Pistoia
- Church: Catholic Church
- Diocese: Diocese of Pistoia
- In office: 1575–1587
- Predecessor: Ludovico Antinori
- Successor: Ottavio Abbiosi

Orders
- Consecration: 19 February 1576 by Giovanni Battista Maremonti

Personal details
- Died: 11 December 1587

Lattanzio Lattanzi (died 1587) was a Roman Catholic prelate who served as Bishop of Pistoia (1575–1587).

== Biography ==
On 2 Dec 1575, Lattanzio Lattanzi was appointed during the papacy of Pope Gregory XIII as Bishop of Pistoia. On 19 Feb 1576, he was consecrated bishop by Giovanni Battista Maremonti, Titular Bishop of Utica, with Antonio Giannotti da Montagnana, Bishop of Forlì, and Annibale Grassi, Bishop of Faenza, serving as co-consecrators. He served as Bishop of Pistoia until his death on 11 Dec 1587.

Catholic Church titles
Preceded by Ludovico Antinori	Bishop of Pistoia; 1575–1587	Succeeded by Ottavio Abbiosi
