= Diocese of Sora-Cassino-Aquino-Pontecorvo =

Roman Catholic diocese in Italy

Coordinates: 41.7167°N 13.6167°E

Diocese of Sora-Cassino-Aquino-Pontecorvo Dioecesis Sorana-Cassinensis-Aquinatensis-Pontiscurvi

Catholic
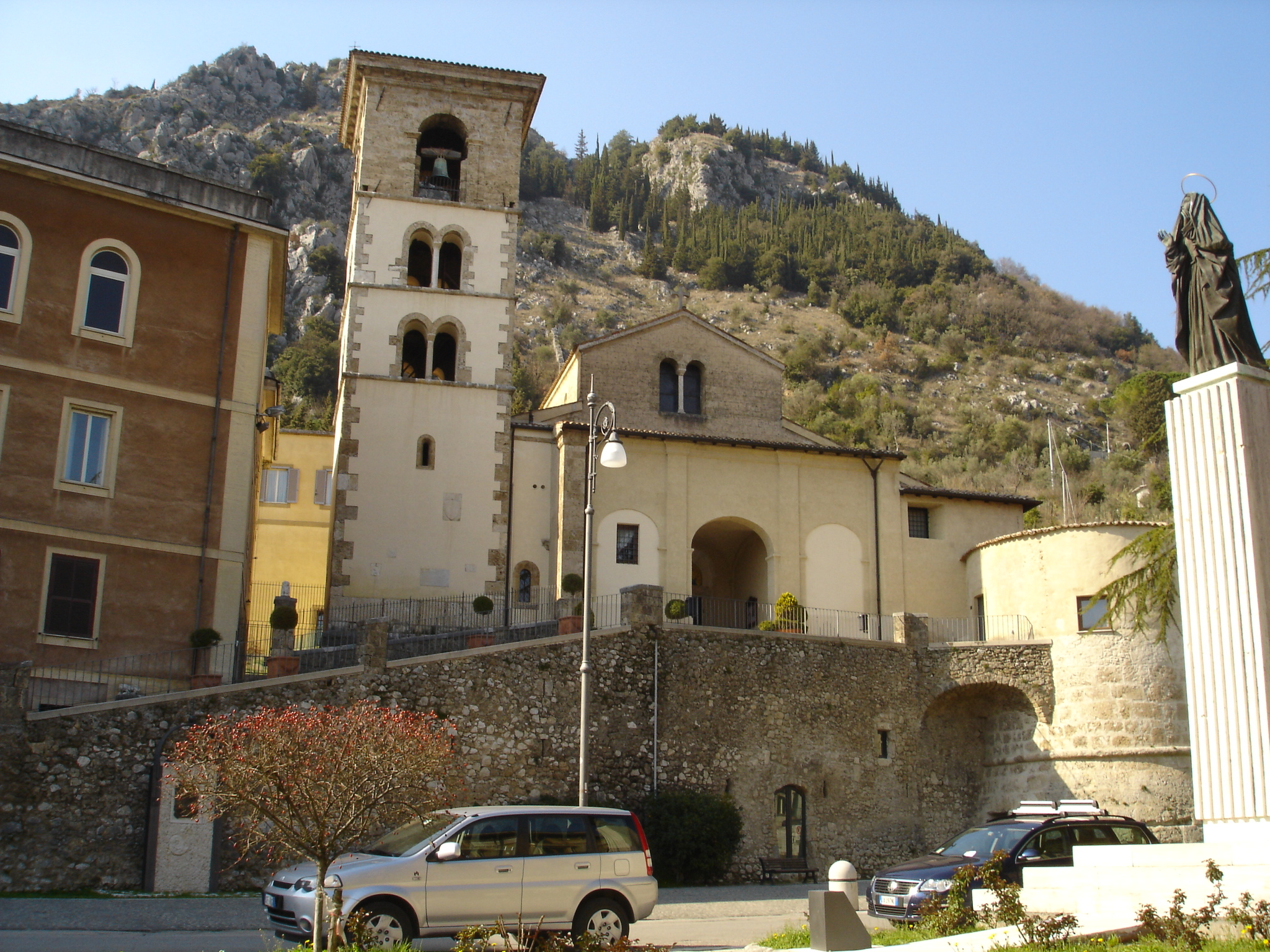
- Sora Cathedral

Location
- Country: Italy
- Ecclesiastical province: Immediately exempt to the Holy See

Statistics
- Area: 2,016 km^{2} (778 sq mi)
- Population: Total; Catholics: (as of 2023); 229,520 (est.) ▲; 219,938 (est.) ▼
- Parishes: 142

Information
- Denomination: Catholic Church
- Sui iuris church: Latin Church
- Rite: Roman Rite
- Established: 5th century (Aquino and Sora); 23 of June 1725 (Pontecorvo) in full communion since September 30, 1986
- Cathedral: Cattedrale di S. Maria Assunta (Sora)
- Co-cathedral: Concattedrale del SS. Salvatore, S. Maria Assunta e S. Germano Vescovo (Cassino); Concattedrale dei Santi Costanzo V. M. e Tommaso d’Aquino (Aquino); Concattedrale di S. Bartolomeo Apostolo (Pontecorvo)
- Patron saint: St. Restituta (Sora); St. Benedict (Cassino); St. Thomas Aquinas (Aquino); St. John the Baptist (Pontecorvo); Our Lady of Canneto (Settefrati)
- Secular priests: 96 (Diocesan) ▼25 (Religious) ▲18 Permanent Deacons

Current leadership
- Pope: Leo XIV
- Bishop: Gerardo Antonazzo
- Vicar General: Alessandro Recchia
- Bishops emeritus: Luca Brandolini, C.M., archbishop Filippo Iannone, O.Carm.

Website
- www.diocesisora.it

The Diocese of Sora-Cassino-Aquino-Pontecorvo (Latin: Dioecesis Sorana-Cassinensis-Aquinatensis-Pontiscurvi) is a Latin Church ecclesiastical jurisdiction or diocese of the Catholic Church in Lazio, Italy. It is an exempt diocese; it is directly dependent upon the Holy See. The seat of the bishop is the Cathedral of St. Mary of the Assumption (Italian: Santa Maria Assunta) in the episcopal see of Sora. The current bishop of Sora-Cassino-Aquino-Pontecorvo is Gerardo Antonazzo, who was appointed on 23 October 2014 by Pope Francis.

== History ==
Sora was an iron age settlement, inhabited successively by the Volsci, the Samnites, and the Romans, who made the town a municipium in 303 B.C. Sora had been a Roman colony already in the Republic; it received additional veterans and privileges from Augustus.

It is claimed that Christianity was first preached in Sora in the mid-1st century by Saint Mark, the disciple of Saint Peter; the story is an attempt to link a local church to the actual apostles and disciples of Christ. The Diocese of Sora originated, according to a dubious tradition, in the 3rd century. Saint Restituta, the alleged martyr of Sora, was probably an African personage, not an Italian one.

On 9 February 1110, Pope Paschal II, in the bull "Sicut injusta petentibus", confirmed the privileges and territory of the diocese of Sora for Bishop Goffridus.

Sora's most distinguished native son was Cardinal Cesare Baronio (1538–1607), author of the Annales Ecclesiastici and Martyrologicum Romanum.

== Cathedral ==
The seat of the bishop is the Cathedral of St. Mary of the Assumption (Italian: Santa Maria Assunta) in Sora. It was consecrated by Pope Adrian IV on 12 June 1155. The cathedral, which was also a parish church, was administered by a corporate body called the Chapter, which was headed by one dignity, the Primicerius, who served as the parish priest. There were also nine canons and four beneficiati.

=== Diocesan synods ===
A diocesan synod was an irregularly held, but important, meeting of the bishop of a diocese and his clergy. Its purpose was (1) to proclaim generally the various decrees already issued by the bishop; (2) to discuss and ratify measures on which the bishop chose to consult with his clergy; (3) to publish statutes and decrees of the diocesan synod, of the provincial synod, and of the Holy See.

Bishop Tommaso Gigli (1561–1576) held a diocesan synod. Bishop Girolamo Giovannelli (1609–1632) held a diocesan synod in Sora in 1614, and published the diocesan statutes. Bishop Matteo Gagliani (1703–1718?) held a synod on 20–21 May 1714.

Bishop Andrea Lucibello (1819–1836) held a diocesan synod for the dioceses of Sora, Aquino and Pontecorvo in the cathedral of Sora during the last week of May 1828. On 21–23 November 1841, Bishop Giuseppe Montieri (1838-1862) held a diocesan synod for the diocese of Pontecorvo. He held a synod in Sora on 7–9 June 1850.

=== Concordat of 1818 ===
Following the extinction of the Napoleonic Kingdom of Italy, the Congress of Vienna authorized the restoration of the Papal States and the Kingdom of Naples. Since the French occupation had seen the abolition of many Church institutions in the Kingdom, as well as the confiscation of most Church property and resources, it was imperative that Pope Pius VII and King Ferdinand IV reach agreement on restoration and restitution. Ferdinand, however, was not prepared to accept the pre-Napoleonic situation, in which Naples was a feudal subject of the papacy. Lengthy, detailed, and acrimonious negotiations ensued.

In 1818, a new concordat with the Kingdom of the Two Sicilies committed the pope to the suppression of more than fifty small dioceses in the kingdom. In the bull "De Utiliori" of 27 June 1818, the diocese of Sora was united with the Diocese of Aquino e Pontecorvo aeque principaliter.

==== Aquino and Pontecorvo ====
On 23 June 1725, the diocese of Pontecorvo had been created by Pope Benedict XIII, out of the territory of the diocese of Aquino, and the dioceses of Aquino and Pontecorvo were united, under the direct governanace of the Papacy. One bishop was to govern both dioceses, aeque principaliter. The name of the union was then the "Diocese of Aquino e Pontecorvo". The diocese of Aquino itself had been established in the 5th century.

=== Diocesan reorganization ===
The Second Vatican Council, in order to ensure that all Catholics received proper spiritual attention, decreed the reorganization of the diocesan structure of Italy and the consolidation of small and struggling dioceses, in particular those with financial and personnel problems. It also decreed that the natural population units of people, together with the civil jurisdictions and social institutions that compose their organic structure, should be preserved as far as possible as units.

On 18 February 1984, the Vatican and the Italian State signed a new and revised concordat. Based on the revisions, a set of Normae was issued on 15 November 1984, which was accompanied in the next year, on 3 June 1985, by enabling legislation. According to the agreement, the practice of having one bishop govern two separate dioceses at the same time, aeque personaliter, was abolished. The Vatican therefore continued consultations which had begun under Pope John XXIII for the merging of dioceses. From 30 September 1986, there has been only one bishop, and the merged diocese has been known as the Diocese of Sora-Aquino-Pontecorvo.

==== Territorial gain ====
On 23 October 2014, Pope Francis transferred the lands of the Benedictine territorial Abbey of Montecassino, except for the territory that was part of the abbey proper, to the diocese of Sora-Aquino-Pontecorvo. The expanded diocese was then renamed the Diocese of Sora-Cassino-Aquino-Pontecorvo. The various religious institutions involved in this transfer included 53 parishes.

=== Co-cathedrals ===
The former cathedrals and mother churches of the suppressed dioceses are now ranked as co-cathedrals: Cassino's, dedicated to The Holy Savior, St. Mary of the Assumption and Saint Germanus Bishop (Italian: Santissimo Salvatore, Santa Maria Assunta e San Germano Vescovo); Aquino's, dedicated to Sts. Constantius Bishop and Martyr and Thomas Aquinas (Italian: Santi Costanzo Vescovo e Martire e Tommaso d’Aquino); and the co-cathedral of St. Bartholomew the Apostle (Italian: S. Bartolomeo Apostolo) in Pontecorvo.

In 2023, there was one priest for every 1,817 Catholics in the diocese.

=== Diocesan patrons ===
The diocese's patrons are St. Restituta, St. Benedict, St. Thomas and St. Bartholomew. On 16 April 2024, Pope Francis, through a decree from the Dicastery for Divine Worship and the Discipline of the Sacraments, recognized the Virgin Mary under the title of "Madonna di Canneto" as the patron of the amalgamated diocese.

== Bishops ==
=== Bishops of Sora ===
Latin Name: Sorana

==== To 1500 ====
[ Amasius (3rd cent.) ]

- Joannes (c. 493–496)
- Aemilius (or Sebastianus) (501, 502)
- Sebastianus (c. 501–504)
- Valerianus (c. 680)
- Leo (c. 978)

...

- Leo (c. 1049, 1050)
- Palumbus (1059-1073)
- Joannes Ostiensis (1073-1086)
- Roffridus (c. 1089)
- Goffrido (1110?-?)
- Landolfus, O.S.B (d. 1162)
- Cardinal Konrad von Wittelsbach (Apostolic Administrator 1167-1200?)
- Bernardus (1174-1186)
- Pandulfo (1211?-?)
- Gionata (1221?-?)
- Guido ( ? –1238?)
- Piero Gaetano (1252) bishop-elect
- Luca (1253-?)
- Pietro Gerra (1267–1278), appointed Bishop of Rieti
- Andrea Perro (1279-1286)
- Bernardo, O.S.B. (1294-1295)
- Nicola (?-1295)
- Andrea Masarone (1296-1322)
- Giacomo (1323-1355)
- Angelo Ricasoli (1355-1357)
- Andrea (1358-1364)
- Martino Del Guidice (1364-1378)
- Piero Corsari (1378-1397)
- Raimundus Venatae (1379– ? ) Avignon Obedience
- Cola Francesco Iacobi (1397-1399) Roman Obedience
- Giacomo D’Antiochia, O.F.M. (1399-1404) Roman Obedience
- Antonius Porziani (1404–1406?) Roman Obedience
- Giacomo D’Antiochia, O.F.M. (again) (1406–1420)
- Giovanni Da Montenegro (1420-1433?)
- Antonio Novelli (1433-1463)
- Angelo Lupi (1463-1471)
- Giacomo (1471-1479?)
- Piero Lupi (1479-1503)

==== From 1500 to 1814 ====
- Matteo Mancini (1503–1505)
- Giacomo de Massimi (1505–1511), appointed Bishop of Città Ducale
- Bernardo Ruggieri (1511–1530)
- Adriano Mascheroni (1530–1531)
- Bartolomeo Ferratini (1531–1534)

○ Cardinal Alessandro Farnese, Apostolic Administrator (1534)

- Eliseo Teodino (1534–1561)

○ Cardinal Alessandro Farnese, jr., Apostolic Administrator (1561)

- Tommaso Gigli (1561–1576)

○ Cardinal Alessandro Farnese, jr., Apostolic Administrator (1577)

- Giovanni Battista Maremonti (1577–1578)
- Orazio Ciceroni (1578–1591)

○ Cardinal Filippo Spinola, Apostolic Administrator (1585)

- Marco Antonio Salomone (1591–1608), resigned
- Giulio Calvi (1608)
- Michele Consoli, O.Theat. (1609)
- Girolamo Giovannelli (1609–1632)
- Paolo Benzoni, C.R.L. (1632–1638)
- Felice Tamburelli (1638–1656)
- Agostino De Bellis, C.R. (1657–1659)
- Maurizio Piccardi (1660–1675)
- Marco Antonio Pisanelli (1675–1680)
- Tommaso Guzzoni, C.O. (1681–1702), resigned
- Matteo Gagliani (1703–?)
- Gabriele de Marchis (1718-1734)
- Scipione Sersale (1735–1744)
- Nicola Cioffi (1744–1748)
- Antonio Correale (1748–1764)
- Tommaso Taglialatela (1765–1768)
- Giuseppe Maria Sisto y Britto, C.R. (1768–1795)
- Agostino Colaianni (1797–1814)

Sede vacante (1814–1818)

=== Bishops of Aquino, Sora, and Pontecorvo ===
Latin Name: Aquinatensis, Sorana et Pontiscurvi
United: 27 June 1818 with the Diocese of Aquino and Pontecorvo

- Andrea Lucibello (1819–1836)
- Giuseppe Mazzetti, O. Carm. (1836-1838), appointed Titular Archbishop of Seleucia in Isauria
- Giuseppe Montieri (1838-1862)
- Paolo do Niquesa (1871-1879)
- Ignazio Persico, O.F.M. Cap. (1879-1887)
- Raffael Sirolli (1887-1899), appointed Titular Archbishop of Iconium
- Luciano Bucci, O.F.M. (1889-1900)
- Antonio Maria Jannotta (1900-1933)
- Agostino Mancinelli (1933–1936)
- Michele Fontevecchia (1936–1952), resigned
- Biagio Musto (1952–1971)
- Carlo Minchiatti (1971–1982)
- Lorenzo Chiarinelli (1983–1986), title changed to Bishop of Sora-Aquino-Pontecorvo

=== Bishops of Sora-Aquino-Pontecorvo ===
Latin Name: Sorana-Aquinatensis-Pontiscurvi
Status Changed: 30 September 1986

- Lorenzo Chiarinelli (1986-1993)
- Luca Brandolini, C.M. (1993–2009), retired
- Filippo Iannone, O. Carm. (2009–2012)
- Gerardo Antonazzo (2013–2014) [title of diocese changed to Bishop of Sora-Cassino-Aquino-Pontecorvo]

=== Bishops of Sora-Cassino-Aquino-Pontecorvo ===
Latin Name: Sorana-Cassinensis-Aquinatensis-Pontiscurvi

Territory added: 23 October 2014 with the Territorial Abbey of Montecassino

- Gerardo Antonazzo (2014– )

== Bibliography ==
=== Sources for lists of bishops ===
- Gams, Pius Bonifatius (1873). Series episcoporum Ecclesiae catholicae: quotquot innotuerunt a beato Petro apostolo (in Latin). Ratisbon: Typis et Sumptibus Georgii Josephi Manz. p. 733.
- Eubel, Conradus, ed. (1913). Hierarchia catholica (in Latin). Vol. Tomus 1 (second ed.). Münster: Libreria Regensbergiana.
- Eubel, Conradus, ed. (1914). Hierarchia catholica (in Latin). Vol. Tomus 2 (second ed.). Münster: Libreria Regensbergiana.
- Eubel, Conradus; Gulik, Guilelmus, eds. (1923). Hierarchia catholica (in Latin). Vol. Tomus 3 (second ed.). Münster: Libreria Regensbergiana.
- Gauchat, Patritius (Patrice) (1935). Hierarchia catholica (in Latin). Vol. Tomus IV (1592-1667). Münster: Libraria Regensbergiana.
- Ritzler, Remigius; Sefrin, Pirminus (1952). Hierarchia catholica medii et recentis aevi V (1667-1730) (in Latin). Patavii: Messagero di S. Antonio.
- Ritzler, Remigius; Sefrin, Pirminus (1958). Hierarchia catholica medii et recentis aevi (in Latin). Vol. Tomus VI (1730-1799). Patavii: Messagero di S. Antonio.
- Ritzler, Remigius; Sefrin, Pirminus (1968). Hierarchia Catholica medii et recentioris aevi sive summorum pontificum, S. R. E. cardinalium, ecclesiarum antistitum series... A pontificatu Pii PP. VII (1800) usque ad pontificatum Gregorii PP. XVI (1846) (in Latin). Vol. VII. Monasterii: Libr. Regensburgiana.
- Remigius Ritzler; Pirminus Sefrin (1978). Hierarchia catholica Medii et recentioris aevi... A Pontificatu PII PP. IX (1846) usque ad Pontificatum Leonis PP. XIII (1903) (in Latin). Vol. VIII. Il Messaggero di S. Antonio.
- Pięta, Zenon (2002). Hierarchia catholica medii et recentioris aevi (in Latin). Vol. 9 (1903–1922). Padua: Messagero di San Antonio. ISBN 978-88-250-1000-8.

=== Studies ===
- Branca, Carlino (1847). Memorie storiche della città di Sora. (in Italian) Napoli: Gemelli 1847.
- Cappelletti, Giuseppe (1870). Le chiese d'Italia dalla loro origine sino ai nostri giorni (in Italian). Vol. Tomo vigesimo primo (21). Venezia: G. Antonelli. pp. 357–364.
- Fedele, P. (1909). "I vescovi di Sora nel secolo undecimo," (in Italian), in: Archivio della Società romana di storia patria Vol. 32 (Roma 1909), pp. 321-334.
- Gulia, Luigi (ed.) (2016). Dalla diocesi di Sora al Soglio pontificio, tra rinascimento e riforma della Chiesa. (in Italian). Convegno, Sora, sabato 29 ottobre 2016. Sora: Centro di studi Sorani Vincenzo Patriarca, 2016.
- Kehr, Paul Fridolin (1935). Italia pontificia (in Latin). Vol. VIII: Regnum Normannorum—Campania. Berlin: Weidmann. pp. X and 100-102.
- Lanzoni, Francesco (1927), Le diocesi d'Italia dalle origini al principio del secolo VII (an. 604). (in Italian). Faenza: F. Lega 1927. Pp.170-172.
- Lauri, Achille (1913). Sora, Isola del Liri e dintorni. Monografie storiche. (in Italian). Sora: V. Damico 1913.
- Norcia, Marianna (2007). "I monasteri di Sora e Val di Comino (Frosinone)," (in Italian), in: Stella Patitucci (ed.), Archeologia del paesaggio medievale. Studi in memoria di Riccardo Francovich. [Quaderni di archeologia medievale, IX]. Borgo San Lorenzo: All'insegna del giglio 2007. pp. 137-149.
- Ughelli, Ferdinando; Coleti, Niccolò (1717). Italia sacra sive De Episcopis Italiae, et insularum adjacentium (in Latin). Vol. 1 (Tomus primus) (editio secunda, aucta et emendata ed.). Venice: apud Sebastianum Coleti. pp. 1243–1249.

==== External links ====
- Contemplationi faventes, original text of the 2014 apostolic constitution redefining territorial jurisdiction of Montecassino
