= Lorenzo Chiarinelli =

Italian Roman Catholic bishop (1935–2020)

- Bishop of Viterbo
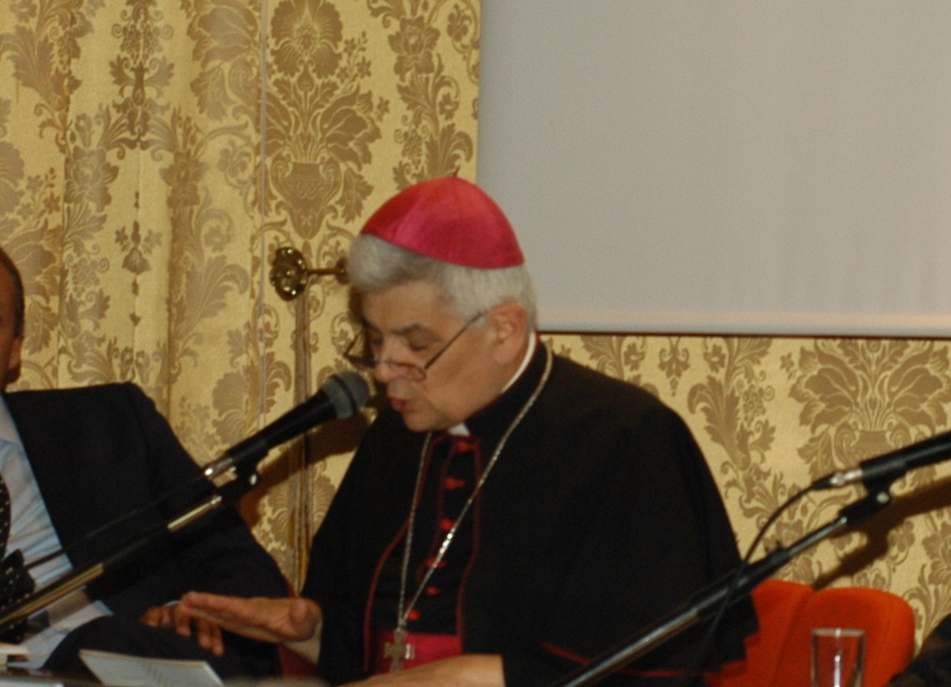
- Chiarinelli in 2005
- Church: Roman Catholic Church
- Diocese: Viterbo
- In office: 1997–2010
- Predecessor: Fiorino Tagliaferri
- Successor: Lino Fumagalli
- Previous posts: Bishop of Sora-Cassino-Aquino-Pontecorvo 1983–1993; Bishop of Aversa 1993–1997

Orders
- Ordination: 15 September 1957
- Consecration: 27 February 1983 by Sebastiano Baggio
- Rank: bishop

Personal details
- Born: 16 March 1935 Concerviano, Italy
- Died: 3 August 2020 (aged 85) Rieti, Italy

Lorenzo Chiarinelli (16 March 1935 – 3 August 2020) was an Italian Roman Catholic prelate. He was born in Concerviano, Italy. He became a priest in 1957, and ordained as a bishop in 1983 by Pope John Paul II.

He was the Bishop of Sora-Cassino-Aquino-Pontecorvo from 1983 to 1993, Aversa from 1993 to 1997 and Viterbo from 1997 to 2010.

Chiarinelli died on 3 August 2020 at the age of 85.
