= Marcantonio Gozzadini =

Italian cardinal

His Eminence Marcantonio Cardinal Gozzadini
- Cardinal priest of Sant'Agata dei Goti; Bishop of Faenza
- See: Diocese of Faenza
- Installed: 7 June 1623 – 1 September 1623
- Predecessor: sede vacante
- Successor: Francesco Cennini de' Salamandri
- Other post: Previously Bishop of Tivoli

Orders
- Consecration: 13 March 1622 by Ludovico Ludovisi
- Created cardinal: 21 July 1621

Personal details
- Born: 1574 Bologna, Italy
- Died: 1 September 1623 (aged 49) Rome

Marcantonio Gozzadini (1574 – 1 September 1623) was an Italian Roman Catholic Cardinal.

== Biography ==
He was born in Bologna into a patrician family. He was a cousin of Pope Gregory XV.

He studied canon and civil law at the University of Bologna and started both his judicial and ecclesiastical career there, but in 1616, he was transferred to Rome as advocate of the Roman Curia.

Gozzadini was created cardinal priest in the consistory of 21 July 1621 and opted for the title of Sant'Eusebio. He was also made Commander of the Sovereign Military Order of Malta by Pope Gregory XV.

In 1621, he was elected Bishop of Tivoli and opted for the title of S. Agata in Suburra on 23 May 1623. On 13 March 1622, he was consecrated bishop by Ludovico Ludovisi, Archbishop of Bologna, with Galeazzo Sanvitale, Archbishop Emeritus of Bari-Canos, and Ulpiano Volpi, Bishop of Novara, serving as co-consecrators.

On 7 June 1623, he was transferred to the Diocese of Faenza. Gozzadini participated in the Papal conclave of 1623.

He died in Rome in 1623.

== Episcopal succession ==
Episcopal succession of Marcantonio Gozzadinia

While bishop, he was the principal consecrator of:

- Alessandro d'Este, Bishop of Reggio Emilia (1622);
- Cristóforo Chrisostome Carletti, Bishop of Termia (1622);
- Andrea Caputo, Titular Bishop of Constantia in Arabia (1622);
- Giovanni de La Bronda, Bishop of Ampurias e Civita (1622);
- Ernst Adalbert of Harrach, Archbishop of Prague (1623);
- Ottaviano Garzadori, Bishop of Boiano (1623);
- Ovidio Lupari, Bishop of Teano (1623);
- Clemente Confetti (Confetto), Titular Bishop of Tiberias (1623);
- Giovanni Francesco Gandolfo, Bishop of Ventimiglia (1623);
- Pace Giordano (Pax Jordanus), Bishop of Trogir (1623);
- Federico Baldissera Bartolomeo Cornaro, Bishop of Bergamo (1623);
- Julius Benigni, Titular Archbishop of Thessalonica (1623); and
- Franciscus Buratti, Bishop of Vulturara e Montecorvino (1623).
