= Giacomo Morandi =

Italian Roman Catholic archbishop (born 1965)

The Most Reverend Giacomo Morandi
- Archbishop-Bishop of Reggio Emilia-Guastalla
- Church: Roman Catholic Church
- Diocese: Reggio Emilia-Guastalla
- See: Reggio Emilia-Guastalla
- Appointed: 10 January 2022
- Installed: 13 March 2022
- Predecessor: Massimo Camisasca
- Previous posts: Titular Archbishop of Caere (2017-2022); Undersecretary of the Congregation for the Doctrine of the Faith (2015-17); Secretary of the Congregation for the Doctrine of the Faith (2017–22)

Orders
- Ordination: 11 April 1990 by Santo Bartolomeo Quadri
- Consecration: 30 September 2017 by Angelo De Donatis

Personal details
- Born: 24 August 1965 Modena, Italy
- Education: Pontifical Biblical Institute; Pontifical Gregorian University
- Motto: Domine tu Omnia scis ("Lord, You know all things")
- Coat of arms: Giacomo Morandi's coat of arms

Styles of Giacomo Morandi
- Reference style: His Excellency; The Most Reverend
- Spoken style: Your Excellency
- Religious style: Archbishop

Ordination history of Giacomo Morandi
History
Priestly ordination
- Ordained by: Santo Bartolomeo Quadri
Episcopal consecration
- Principal consecrator: Angelo De Donatis
- Co-consecrators: Erio Castellucci; Luciano Monari

Giacomo Morandi (born 24 August 1965) is an Italian Catholic prelate who served as Bishop of Reggio Emilia-Guastalla since 2022. He was elected president of the regional bishops' conference in 2024.

Morandi served as the undersecretary of the Congregation for the Doctrine of the Faith from 2015 to 2017 and then as secretary until 2022. He was made an archbishop in 2017 and retains that as his personal title.

== Life ==
Giacomo Morandi was born in Modena on 24 August 1965.

In 1978 he commenced his studies for the priesthood in Modena and received his ordination on 11 April 1990 from Archbishop Santo Bartolomeo Quadri. He obtained his baccalaureate in theological studies and in 1992 obtained a licentiate in Biblical Sciences at the Pontifical Biblical Institute in Rome. In 2008 he obtained a licentiate and a doctorate in theological evangelization at the Pontifical Gregorian as well as in missiology. Morandi also served as a professor at the Institute of Religious Sciences in Modena and as a lecturer on patristic exegesis at an institute in Rome.

Morandi held various pastoral positions in the Modena archdiocese and he served as the vicar for episcopal catechesis and both evangelization and culture from 2005 until 2010 before his appointment in November 2010 as the vicar general for the archdiocese. This assignment ceased in 2015 upon the death of the archbishop at which stage he served as the diocesan administrator from 20 February to 12 September 2015 until the selection of a new archbishop. On 14 September the new archbishop Erio Castellucci reappointed him as the archdiocese's vicar general.

On 27 October 2015, Pope Francis appointed him undersecretary of the Congregation for the Doctrine of the Faith. On 18 July 2017, he appointed him secretary of that body and elevated him to the rank of archbishop with the titular see of Cerveteri. Morandi received his episcopal consecration in the Modena Cathedral on 30 September 2017 from Archbishop Angelo De Donatis, along with co-consecrators Archbishop Erio Castellucci and Bishop Luciano Monari. He was reportedly responsible for the Congregation's March 2021 document that explained why the church forbids the blessing of same-sex unions, which was largely respectful of those in such relationships but proved controversial for its assertion that the church "cannot bless sin".

On 10 January 2022, Pope Francis named him as the bishop of Reggio Emilia-Guastalla, granting him the use of the personal title of archbishop. His installation there was scheduled for 13 March.

Morandi was named president of the Episcopal Conference of Reggio Emilia-Guastalla in 2024.

== Published works ==
- Lugo teologico di evangelizzazione, Milano, Edizioni Paoline, 2009, ISBN 978-88-315-3582-3.

Catholic Church titles
Preceded by Luis Francisco Ladaria Ferrer	Secretary of the Congregation for the Doctrine of the Faith; 2017 – 2022	Incumbent
Preceded by Francesco Saverio Salerno	— TITULAR — Titular Archbishop of Cerveteri; 2017 – 2022	Incumbent
