= Andreasi =

Andreasi is a surname. Notable people with the surname include:

- Felice Andreasi (1928–2005), Italian actor
- Giorgio Andreasi (1467–1549), Italian Roman Catholic bishop
- Ippolito Andreasi (1548–1608), Italian painter

== See also ==
- Andreas
