= Alessandro d'Este =

Roman Catholic cardinal

His Eminence Alessandro d'Este
- Cardinal-Priest of Santa Maria della Pace; Bishop of Reggio Emilia
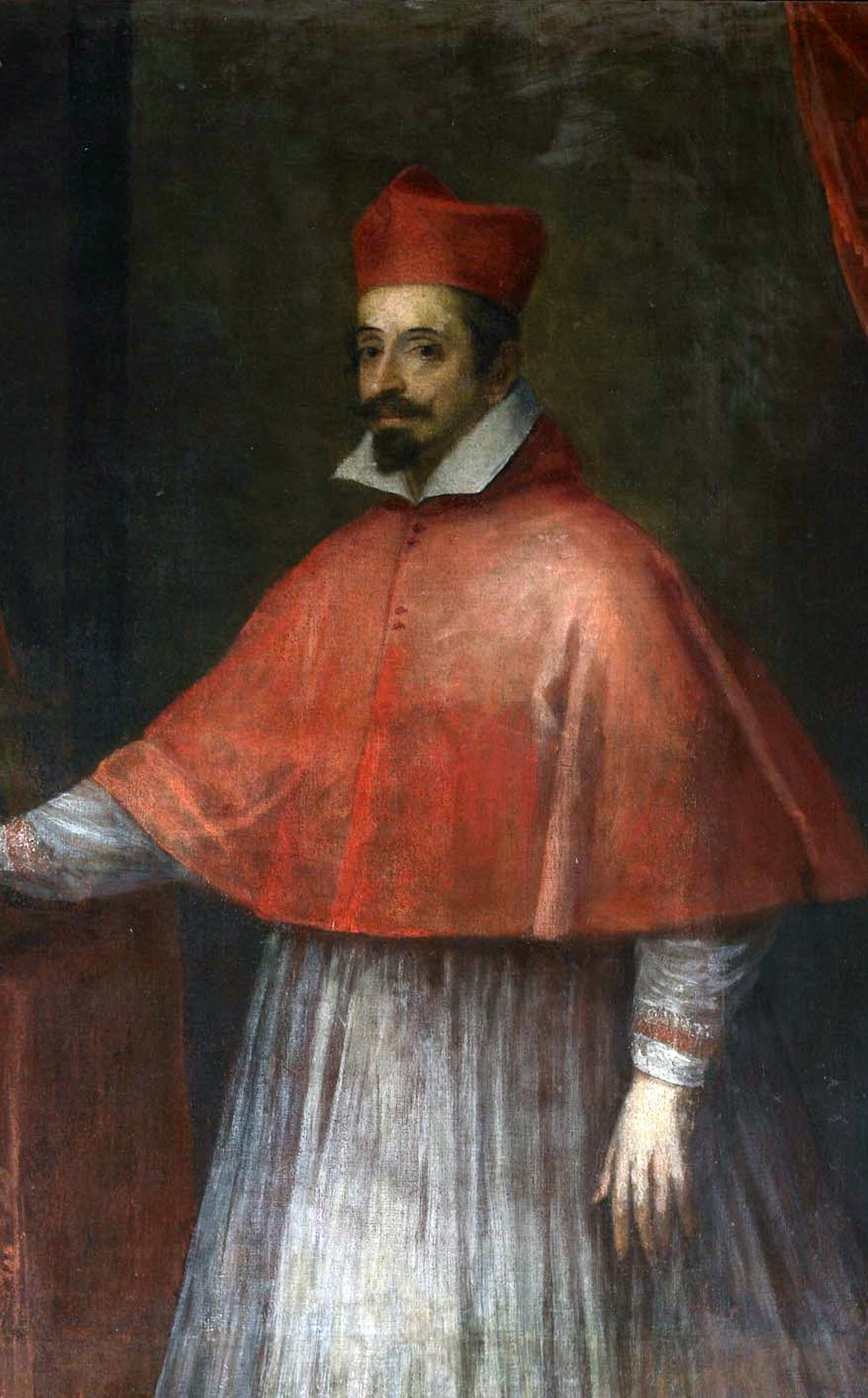
- Church: Catholic Church

Orders
- Consecration: 3 Apr 1622 by Marco Antonio Gozzadini

Personal details
- Born: 5 May 1568 Ferrara, Italy
- Died: 13 May 1624 (age 56)

Alessandro d'Este (1568–1624) was a Roman Catholic cardinal.

== Biography ==
He was born on May 5, 1568, the illegitimate and later acknowledged son of Alfonso d'Este, Marquis of Montecchio and Violante Segni.

Alessandro pursued his studies at the University of Padua, where he earned a degree in law. He was ordained a priest in 1587.

During the historical period leading up to the devolution of Ferrara in 1598, he was sent temporarily to Modena by his brother, Cesare d'Este, to take possession of the Duchy of Modena and Reggio before Cesare himself arrived.

On 3 Apr 1622, he was consecrated Bishop of Reggio Emilia by Marco Antonio Gozzadini, Bishop of Recanati with Raffaele Inviziati, Bishop Emeritus of Cefalonia e Zante, and Giulio Sansedoni, Bishop Emeritus of Grosseto, serving as co-consecrators.

He died on May 13, 1624, and was buried in the Church of Santa Maria Maggiore in Tivoli.

Catholic Church titles
Preceded by Giovanni Battista Deti	Cardinal-Deacon of Sant'Adriano al Foro; 1600	Succeeded by Giovanni Doria
Preceded by Andreas von Austria	Cardinal-Deacon of Santa Maria Nuova; 1600–1621	Succeeded by Maurizio di Savoia
Preceded by Andrea Baroni Peretti Montalto	Cardinal-Deacon of Sant'Eustachio; 1621	Succeeded by Maurizio di Savoia
Preceded by Andrea Baroni Peretti Montalto	Cardinal-Deacon of Santa Maria in Via Lata; 1621–1623	Succeeded by Carlo Emmanuele Pio di Savoia
Preceded by Claudio Rangoni	Bishop of Reggio Emilia; 1621–1624	Succeeded by Paolo Coccapani
Preceded by Giacomo Serra	Cardinal-Priest of Santa Maria della Pace; 1623–1624	Succeeded by Melchior Klesl
