= Rinaldo d'Este (1618–1672) =

Italian Catholic Cardinal

His Eminence Rinaldo d'Este
- Cardinal-Bishop of Palestrina
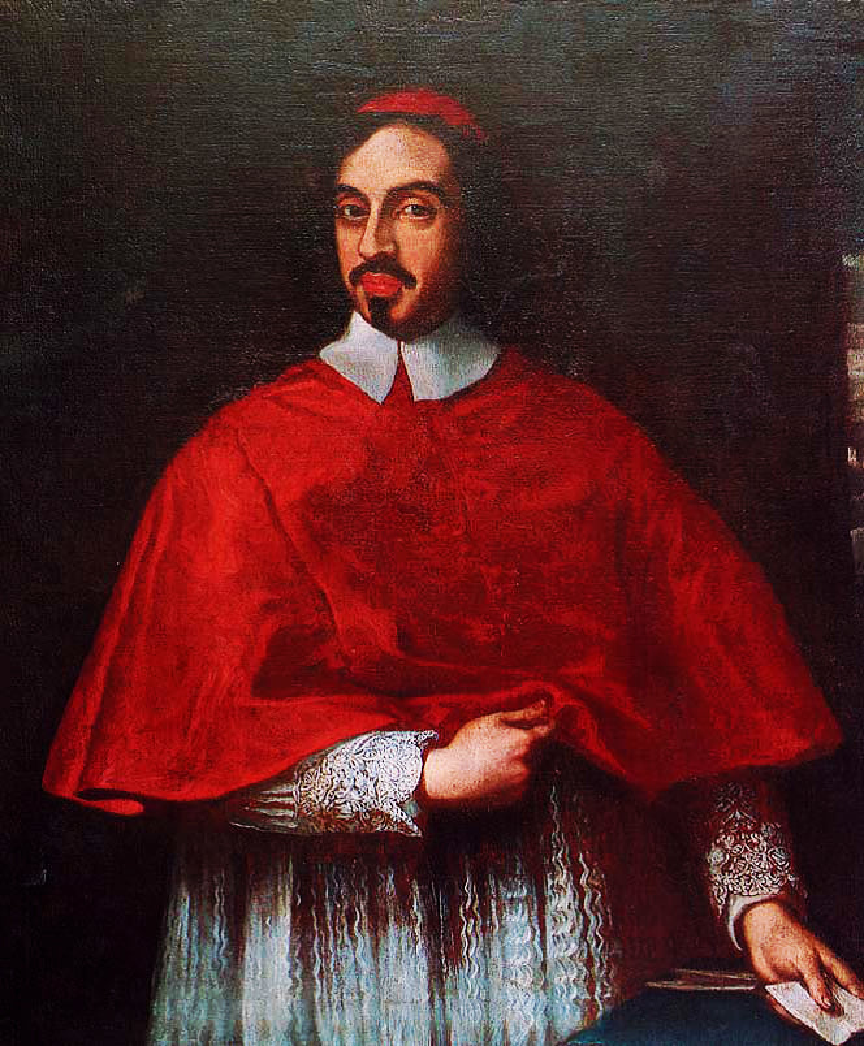
- Church: Catholic Church
- Appointed: 24 August 1671
- Term ended: 30 September 1672
- Predecessor: Antonio Barberini
- Successor: Cesare Facchinetti
- Other posts: Abbot of Cluny (1661-1672)
- Previous posts: Cardinal-Deacon of San Nicola in Carcere (1644–1668); Bishop of Reggio Emilia (1650–1660); Cardinal-Priest of Santa Pudenziana (1668–1671)

Orders
- Consecration: 28 October 1651
- Created cardinal: 16 December 1641 by Pope Urban VIII
- Rank: Cardinal-Bishop

Personal details
- Born: 1618 Modena, Duchy of Modena and Reggio
- Died: 30 September 1672 (aged 53–54) Modena, Duchy of Modena and Reggio
- Parents: Alfonso III d'Este (Father); Isabella of Savoy (Mother)

Rinaldo d'Este (1618 – 30 September 1672) was an Italian Catholic cardinal.

== Early life and education ==
Rinaldo d'Este was born in 1618, the son of Alfonso III d'Este, Duke of Modena, and Isabella of Savoy. He was the brother of Francesco d'Este who succeeded his father as Duke of Modena. As a boy, he undertook military study in Modena but left to answer an ecclesiastic calling.

== Early ecclesiastic career ==
Little is known of his early Church career but he was elevated to cardinal by Pope Urban VIII at the request of Ferdinand III, Holy Roman Emperor, in 1641; and this was published in the consistory of 16 December that year. However, the First War of Castro broke out between Barberini Pope Urban and the Farnese Dukes of Parma. As a result, Rinaldo d'Este refused to travel to Rome to receive his cardinal's hat. Instead, when Pope Urban died in 1644, he travelled to Rome to participate in the papal conclave which elected Pope Innocent X who then conducted the ceremony following his own papal coronation.

After Pope Innocent's election, though, d'Este had a falling out with members of the Spanish faction of the College of Cardinals who had been the driving force behind the Pope's election against candidates put forward by the French faction. After the falling out, d'Este declared himself for France. As a result, though his family had previously been in conflict with the Barberini, he became their ardent supporters while they were in exile in France. He returned to Modena and became temporary ruler when his brother left to fight the Spanish in 1647.

Later, he returned to Rome upon hearing that the Admiral of Castile was visiting as ambassador of the Kingdom of Spain. The Admiral, though, saw every cardinal except for d'Este on the grounds that d'Este had declared himself for France. The slight escalated and both the Admiral and Cardinal d'Este raised 600 men-at-arms each in preparation for armed conflict; d'Este having pawned jewels to hire militia as neither his family nor his French supporters had been able to raise funds quickly enough. Eventually, the conflict was quelled when Pope Innocent ordered his own troops to enter Rome to keep the peace, though several militiamen on both sides were killed.

== Later ecclesiastic career ==
He was elected Bishop of Reggio Emilia in December 1650 and participated in the papal conclave of 1655 which elected Pope Alexander VII, the conclave of 1667, which elected Pope Clement IX and the conclave of 1669–1670, which elected Pope Clement X. At various times he returned to Modena to rule in his brother's absence, his nephew Rinaldo being too young to take his father's place.

On 24 August 1671, he opted for the order of bishops and was appointed Cardinal-Bishop of Palestrina.

He died on 30 September 1672 in Modena.

He was the principal consecrator of Francesco Casati, Titular Archbishop of Trapezus (1670).

Catholic Church titles
Preceded by Cardinal Mazarin	Abbot of Cluny; 1661-1672	Succeeded by Henri Bertrand de Beuvron
Preceded by Andreas von Austria	Cardinal-Deacon of Santa Maria Nuova; 1600–1621	Succeeded by Maurizio di Savoia
Preceded by Giangiacomo Teodoro Trivulzio	Cardinal-Deacon of San Nicola in Carcere; 1644–1668	Succeeded by Friedrich von Hessen-Darmstadt
Preceded by Paolo Coccapani	Bishop of Reggio Emilia; 1650–1660	Succeeded by Girolamo Codebò
Preceded by Alderano Cibo	Cardinal-Priest of Santa Pudenziana; 1668–1671	Succeeded by Gasparo Carpegna
Preceded by Virginio Orsini	Cardinal-Priest of San Lorenzo in Lucina; 1671	Succeeded by Cesare Facchinetti
Preceded by Antonio Barberini	Cardinal-Bishop of Palestrina; 1671–1672	Succeeded by Cesare Facchinetti
