= Antonio Beltrando =

Most Reverend Antonio Beltrando
- Bishop of Reggio Emilia
- Church: Catholic Church
- Diocese: Diocese of Reggio Emilia
- In office: 1466–1476
- Predecessor: Battista Pallavicino
- Successor: Bonfrancesco Arlotti

Personal details
- Died: 5 May 1476 Reggio Emilia, Italy

Antonio Beltrando or Antonio Trombetta (died 5 May 1476) was a Roman Catholic prelate who served as Bishop of Reggio Emilia (1466–1476).

== Biography ==
On 28 May 1466, Antonio Beltrando was appointed during the papacy of Pope Paul II as Bishop of Reggio Emilia. He served as Bishop of Reggio Emilia until his death on 5 May 1476. While bishop, he served as the principal co-consecrator of Pietro Mattei, Bishop of Sant'Agata de' Goti (1469).

== External links and additional sources ==
- Cheney, David M. "Diocese of Reggio Emilia-Guastalla". Catholic-Hierarchy.org. (for Chronology of Bishops) ^{[self-published]}
- Chow, Gabriel. "Diocese of Reggio Emilia-Guastalla (Italy)". GCatholic.org. (for Chronology of Bishops) ^{[self-published]}

Catholic Church titles
Preceded by Battista Pallavicino	Bishop of Reggio Emilia; 1466–1476	Succeeded by Bonfrancesco Arlotti
