= Ugo Rangone =

Italian Roman Catholic prelate

Most Reverend Ugo Rangone
- Bishop of Reggio Emilia
- Church: Catholic Church
- Diocese: Diocese of Reggio Emilia
- In office: 1510–1540
- Predecessor: Gianluca Castellini
- Successor: Marcello Cervini

Personal details
- Died: 25 August 1540 Reggio Emilia, Italy

Ugo Rangone (died 25 August 1540) was a Roman Catholic prelate who served as Bishop of Reggio Emilia (1510–1540).

== Biography ==
On 18 October 1510, Ugo Rangone was appointed by Pope Julius II as Bishop of Reggio Emilia. He did not take possession of the diocese, however, until 5 July 1512, after the city had surrendered to Julius II and the Interdict was lifted. At the same time, he was appointed Prolegate in Piacenza and Parma, two cities which had been reclaimed by Pope Julius for the Papal States.

In February 1533, Rangone, who was serving as the Pope's Private Secretary, was sent as a papal nuncio by Pope Clement VII to Germany, to King Ferdinand and the German princes, to make arrangements for the projected ecumenical council.

Pope Paul III (1534–1549) sent Rangone as Legate to the Emperor Charles V in Spain.

On 15 January 1535, Bishop Rangone was appointed Vice-Chamberlain and Governor of the city of Rome. He served until May 1538.

He served as Bishop of Reggio Emilia until his death on 25 August 1540, in Modena. His body was carried to Reggio, where it was buried in the cathedral on 28 August.

== Sources ==
- Saccani, Giovanni (1902). I vescovi di Reggio-Emilia, Cronotassi, Reggio Emilia: Tip. Artigianelli 1902. pp. 115–117. (in Italian)
- Ughelli, Ferdinando; Coleti, Niccolo (1717). Italia sacra sive de Episcopis Italiae (in Latin). Vol. Tomus secundus (II) (secunda ed.). Venice: Apud Sebastianum Coleti. pp. 314–315.

Catholic Church titles
Preceded by Gianluca Castellini	Bishop of Reggio Emilia; 1510–1540	Succeeded by Marcello Cervini
