= Diocese of Reggio Emilia–Guastalla =

Roman Catholic diocese in Italy

Coordinates: 44.7000°N 10.6333°E

Diocese of Reggio Emilia–Guastalla Dioecesis Regiensis in Aemilia–Guastallensis

Catholic
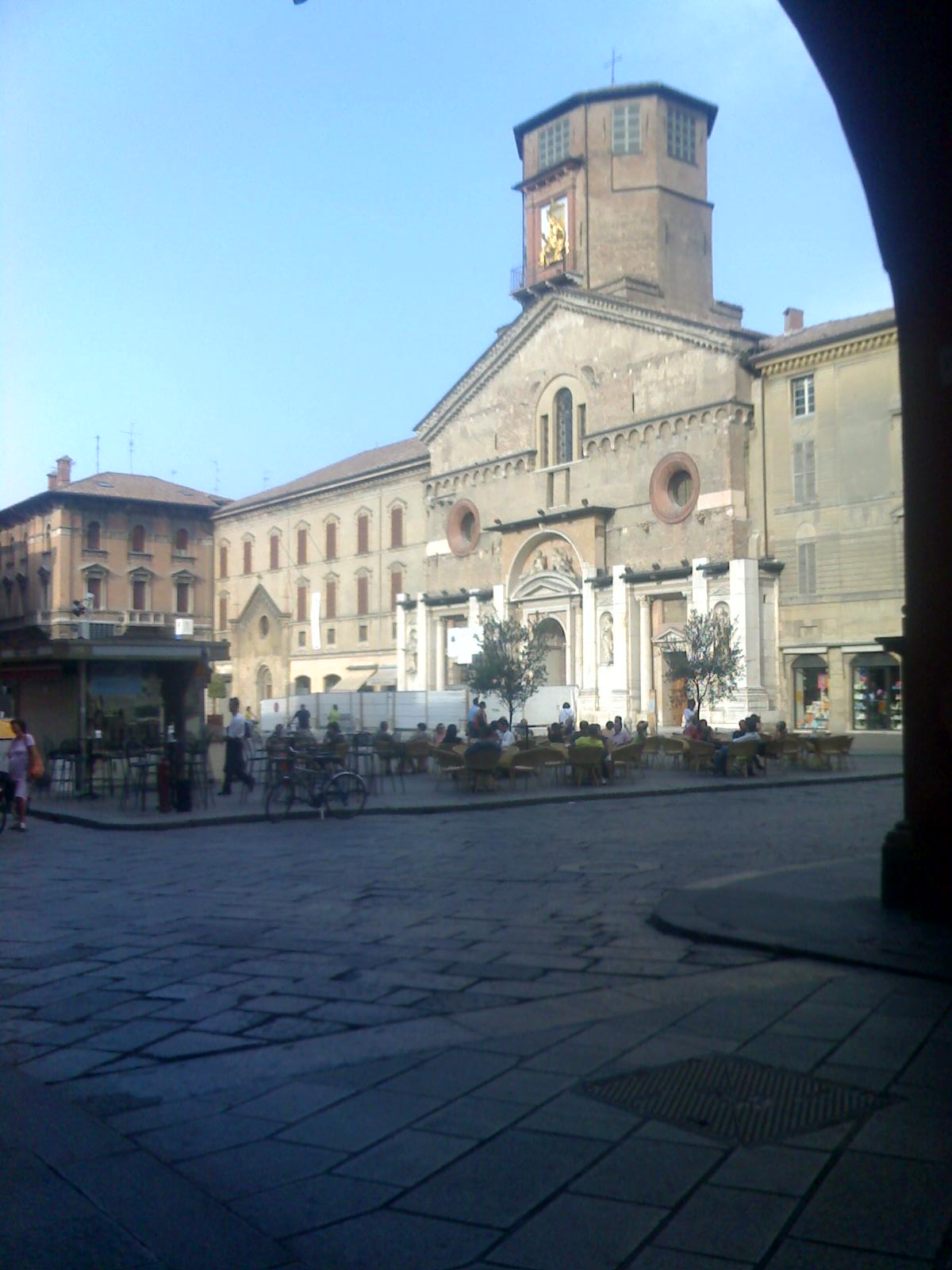
- Reggio Emilia Cathedral

Location
- Country: Italy
- Ecclesiastical province: Modena–Nonantola
- Headquarters: n/a

Statistics
- Area: 2,394 km^{2} (924 sq mi)
- Population: Total; Catholics: (as of 2023); 571,167 ▲; 500,056 ▲ (87.5%)
- Parishes: 306 ▼

Information
- Denomination: Catholic Church
- Rite: Roman Rite
- Established: 4th century
- Cathedral: Cattedrale di Beata Vergine Assunta (Reggio Emilia)
- Co-cathedral: Concattedrale di Ss. Pietro e Paolo (Guastalla)
- Secular priests: 200 (diocesan) ▼25 (Religious Orders) ▲140 Permanent Deacons ▲

Current leadership
- Pope: Leo XIV
- Bishop: Giacomo Morandi
- Bishops emeritus: Massimo Camisasca

Map

Website
- Diocesi di Reggio Emilia-Guastalla (in Italian)

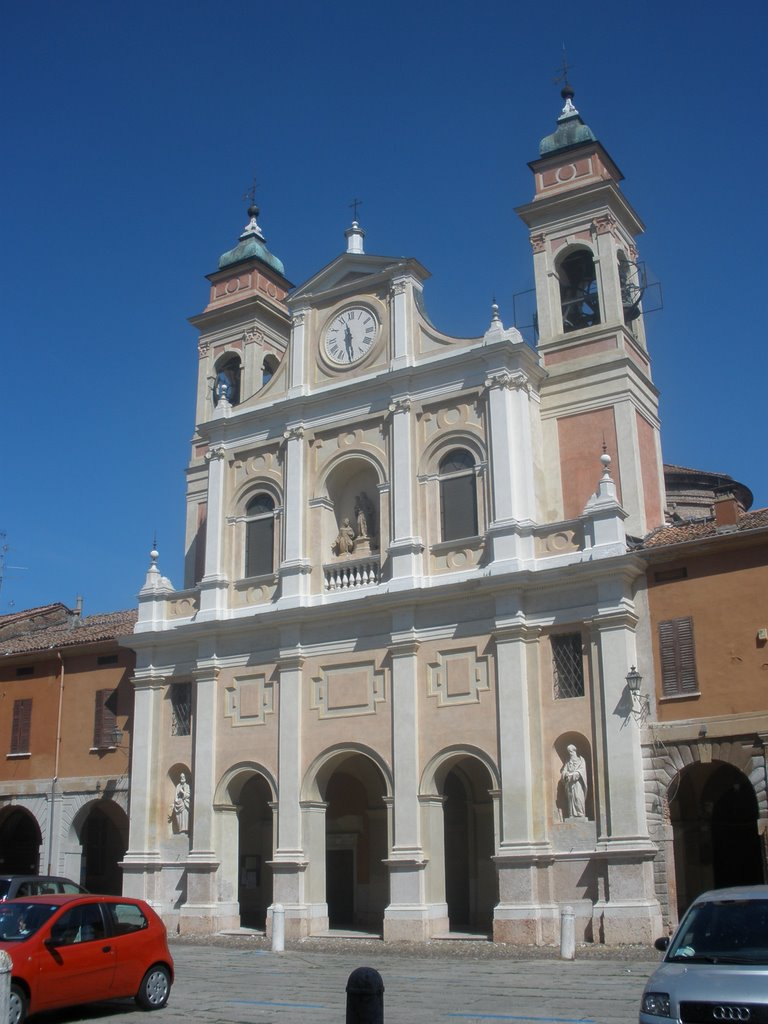
Co-cathedral in Guastalla

The Diocese of Reggio Emilia–Guastalla (Latin: Dioecesis Regiensis in Aemilia–Guastallensis) is a Latin diocese of the Catholic Church in Emilia-Romagna, Italy. It has existed in its current form since 1986. In that year the historical Diocese of Reggio Emilia was united with the Diocese of Guastalla. The diocese is a suffragan of the Archdiocese of Modena–Nonantola.

Originally the diocese was part of the ecclesiastical province of Milan, then it was suffragan to the Archbishop of Ravenna. Because of the schism of the Antipope Clement III, Pope Paschal II released the dioceses of Emilia, including Reggio, from obedience to the church of Ravenna, and made them directly subject to the Holy See (Rome), but twelve years later Pope Gelasius II restored the previous status. In 1582 the diocese of Bologna was raised to the status of a metropolitan archbishopric. Reggio was made a suffragan of the archdiocese of Bologna, by Pope Gregory XIII in the bull Universi orbis of 10 December 1582. Modena was raised to the status of an archdiocese and its bishop to the status of a Metropolitan Archbishop by Pope Pius IX in his bull of 22 August 1855, entitled Vel ab antiquis. Reggio became one of its suffragans.

== History ==
A local legend makes the first bishop of Reggio Saint Protasius, a disciple of Saint Apollinaris, a first-century disciple of Saint Peter himself. Admitting his existence, also five or six historical bishops, predecessors of Faventius in 451, it would seem that the episcopal see dates from the first half of the 4th century. Bishop Prosper was a successor of Faventius; he died between 461 and 467.

Bishop Teuzo (978–1030) was named a Missus of the Holy Roman Empire by the Empire by the Emperor Conrad II (1027–1039). This brought with it the title of Prince, and the bishops of Reggio continued to enjoy the privilege and title until the end of the 14th century.

In the Capitulary of Quierzy, Reggio was included among the towns which Pepin had in mind for the Donation of Pepin, but it came into possession of the Papal States only later, and for a short time. After the death of Countess Matilda (1115) the popes claimed the town as a part of her inheritance, while the emperors claimed the same as a fief of the Holy Roman Empire.

On 21 April 1141, the metropolitan Archbishop of Ravenna, Gualterius, was obliged to hold a synod at Reggio, for the purpose of composing the differences which existed between the people and their leaders, as well as disputes among the leading clergy of the diocese. The synod was attended by Bishop Alberio of Reggio, as well as by four other bishops. The Archdeacon of Reggio had issues with the canons of the cathedral and with the brothers of S. Prospero as well, over various chapels and pieces of property.

=== Bishop Nicolò Maltraversi ===
According to the Cronica of Fra Salimbene of Parma, Nicolò was named bishop in 1211, with the approval of both the Emperor Otto IV and Pope Innocent III. But on 8 April 1213, he is still called bishop-elect. Only on 25 September 1213 does he have the full title of Bishop of Reggio. In Piacenza he attempted to broker a peace between the Ghibelline Sessi and the Guelph Roberti-Fogliani. In 1221 he helped Cardinal Ugolino (later Pope Gregory IX) preach the crusade in northern Italy. In 1224, he was papal mediator in peace talks between Bologna and Mantua. In May and June 1230, Bishop Nicolò dei Maltraversi (1211–1243) accompanied an embassy of the Emperor Frederick II to Pope Gregory IX, in the hope of bringing peace between Empire and Church. On 1 July 1230 he was present in the major church of San Germano to witness the papal reconciliation with the Emperor. In 1233, he was granted the right to issue coinage by Frederick II. In April 1242, the Emperor Frederick wrote a letter to Bishop Maltraversi, expressing his joy at the bishop's success in bringing his nephews and other relatives (consanguineos et nepotes tuos) back to the imperial side (the Ghibellines) and loyalty to the Emperor; he urged Nicolò to return to him as soon as possible, to assist in some difficult and useful matters.

When Bishop Nicolò died in 1243, probably in August, the new pope, Innocent IV (Sinibaldo Fieschi of Genoa), immediately issued a decree on 24 August, reserving for himself the right to appoint (provisio) a new bishop of Reggio. Nonetheless, on 2 September 1243, he wrote to the Bishop of Modena and to his own nephew, the Archdeacon of Parma, that they should lift the sentences of excommunication which had been pronounced against the Canons of Reggio, and order the Canons to elect a bishop within twenty days; otherwise, the Bishop of Modena should choose a suitable candidate as bishop. When the Canons proceeded to an election, two candidates were produced: the Ghibellines supported the Provost of S. Prospero, Guicciolo Albriconi; the Guelphs supported Guglielmo Fogliano, a canon of the cathedral and a nephew of Pope Innocent. According to Fra Salimbene, there were extensive disturbances (magna discordia) in the city in September. After an investigation of the canonical validity of the election, the Pope pronounced his nephew to be the new bishop. Since the agents of the Emperor Frederick's son Enzo had possession of the episcopal palace, Bishop-elect Fogliano was forced into exile. He did not gain possession of the diocese until 1252, and was still not consecrated bishop by 23 May 1255, when he received an extension on the time-limit.

=== The election of 1301–1302 ===
Bishop Guglielmo of Bobbio died at Bobbio on 3 September 1301. The Chapter of the cathedral of Reggio met, and at the request of Azzo d'Este, Lord of Reggio, they unanimously elected Fra Giovannino dei Melonelli, O.Min. The Minister General of the Franciscans, however, refused to sanction the election, and Pope Boniface VIII therefore quashed the election. The Pope then nominated Matteo Visconti, a Canon of the cathedral of Milan, who refused the election. Finally, on 3 April, in a public consistory, the Pope proposed the name of Enrico de Casalorci, who was a Canon of the cathedral of Cremona. His appointment was published at the Lateran on 30 April, and he was consecrated at Anagni by Cardinal Matteo di Aquasparta, Bishop of Porto, on 22 July 1302. His formal entry into his diocese took place on 17 August.

Bishop Serafino Tavacci, O.Min. (1379–1387) was the first bishop of Reggio to enjoy the title Prince.

=== Imperial Reggio ===
Reggio accepted the vicars of Emperor Henry VII and Louis the Bavarian, and was subject to the pope under Cardinal Bertrand du Poyet (1322). Later (1331), John of Bohemia, who recognized the suzerainty of the pope over Reggio as well as over Parma and Modena, was made lord of the city, but sold it to the Fogliani, from whom it passed to the Gonzaga of Mantua (1335), who sold it to Galeazzo II Visconti of Milan. In 1409 it returned again to the House of Este of the line of Modena, until 1859. The popes, however, always claimed to be its suzerains. After the Ferrara War, Reggio spontaneously submitted to Pope Julius II (1512–15). By the Peace of Barcelona (1529), Emperor Charles V bound himself to give back Reggio to the popes, but he did not do so.

=== Plague ===
Reggio Emilia was stricken particularly hard by the bubonic plague from 1630 to 1632, the result of German troop movements in the war between the French and the Empire. The Church began its campaign against the plague on 18 April 1630, with a procession ordered by the bishop and magistrates, which featured the carrying of the right foot of Mary Magdalene, the head of Saint Maurizio, arms of S. Reparata and S. Catherine, and the remains of S. Apollonia, S. Abondonio, and S. Prospero. An inscription at Guastalla states that 2,104 persons had died in one parish alone. At Gualtieri, by 20 March 1631, 463 out of a population of 1380 had died. Inside the city of Reggio, 3617 persons died of the plague, and outside the city an additional 2,130.

Bishop Augusto Bellincini (1675–1700) was responsible for the introduction of the Priests of the Mission (C.M.) to the diocese of Reggio (1681). He also found quarters for the Discalced Carmelites (O.C.D.) in 1685, and introduced the Discalced Carmelite nuns to the diocese (1689). He also welcomed the Minims of S. Francesco di Paola in 1696.

=== Cathedral and Chapter ===
On 13 June 1200, Pope Innocent III, in the bull Cum a nobis, at the request of the chapter of the cathedral, fixed the maximum number of Canons which the Chapter could have at sixteen. This was necessary, the bull states, because numbers of relatives and hangers-on who obtained canonries were appropriating the property belonging to the Chapter.

Bishop Nicolò dei Maltraversi (1211–1243) suppressed the office of Provost of the Cathedral in 1212.

In 1674, the Cathedral Chapter consisted of three dignities and fifteen Canons. The dignities were: the Archpriest, the Archdeacon, and the Majuscola (Magister Scholae). In addition, in accordance with the decrees of the Council of Trent, one Canon was designated the Theologus, and another the Penitentiary. In 1857, there were those five, plus eight other Canons.

=== Synods ===
Bishop Benedetto Manzoli held a diocesan synod in Reggio in 1581. Synods were held by Bishop Claudio Rangoni (1592–1621) on 20 June 1595, and on 17 July 1597.

Bishop Paolo Coccapani (1625–1650) held a diocesan synod on 26 April 1627. Bishop Giovanni Agostino Marliani held a diocesan synod in Reggio on 15–17 June 1665. He held a second synod on 17–19 April 1674. Bishop Augusto Bellincini (1674–1700) presided over a diocesan synod on 20–22 May 1697. This was the last synod held in the diocese of Reggio until the synod of 2–4 October 1894, held by Bishop Vincenzo Manicardi.

=== Seminary ===
Bishop Giambattista Grossi (1549–1569) brought home the idea of a seminary for the diocese from the Council of Trent, which had decreed in its twenty-third Session that every diocese should have a seminary for the education of the clergy. He consulted with the Cathedral Chapter and with the clergy of the city as to the means to comply, and then, on 3 January 1567, he issued a decree calling for a tax on every benefice in the diocese to raise funds. He died two years later, however, without having advanced the plan any farther. His successor, Bishop Eustachio Locatelli, held another conference, in which it was decided to appoint a deputy to engage in planning and fund raising, but he too died before advancing the plan significantly. In the Synod of 1581, Bishop Benedetto Manzoli (1578–1585) expressed his resolution to create the seminary immediately, but he too died before accomplishing anything. Bishop Claudio Rangone, too, had good intentions, which he expressed in his Synod of 1595, but his work as a diplomat for Pope Clement VIII took him away from the diocese. It was not until 21 December 1614 that he instituted the college of seminarians in the cathedral. Rooms were provided for the five students through the generosity of the Canons, who made some rooms belonging to them available, for a period of three years. Thereafter, the seminary was without a home, and dependent upon the creation of a benefice by the bishop to fund them. When Bishop Rangone died, the seminary closed.

The next bishop, Cardinal Alessandro d'Este (1621–1624), however, took immediate steps to resurrect the seminary. In November 1622 he ordered the collection of the back taxes due on each of Reggio's benefices for the support of the seminary, and on 6 March 1623, he ordered the Chapter and clergy of the city to elect delegates to supervise the seminary; the bishop himself appointed his own delegates to each committee. In 1625, there were six seminarians, living in the rooms rented from the Chapter. It was not intended that the number should exceed twelve. In the synod of 1627, the Bishop conceded that the seminary was in difficulties, and in 1648 it was again closed, due to extreme financial difficulties.

The next three bishops, Rinaldo d'Este (1650–1660), Girolamo Codebò (1661), Giovanni Agostino Marliani (1662–1674) worked with determination, though intermittently, to bring together sufficient property (some of it by the suppression of churches and transfer of assets) to provide operating capital for a new seminary, and even during the Sede vacante following the death of Bishop Marliani the Chapter demonstrated a will to reopen the seminary. In 1674, the seminary was opened on the top floor of the Episcopal Palace. When Augusto Bellincini was appointed bishop, he immediately began his own efforts to raise additional funds. At the end of the seventeenth century, there were thirty seminarians.

The increase in students, and the fact that the Episcopal Palace had no courtyard that could be used by the seminarians for recreation, meant that a new building was required, which was opened in 1723. In 1726 there were fifty-six seminarians. The seminary was closed by the French occupying authorities in July 1798. On 8 July 1805, however, the new King of Italy, the Emperor Bonaparte, issued an edict, allowing bishops to reopen their seminaries. That action was delayed in Reggio, however, due to a dispute between Bishop d'Este and the municipal authorities, who had taken ownership of the seminary building, the Palazzo Busetti, which had been turned into a public grammar school. The seminary finally reopened in December 1808, though in the Episcopal Palace again, and on 8 March 1809 had twenty-nine seminarians. In October 1831, after negotiations involving the Pope and the Duke of Modena, the seminary moved to the Palazzo Busetti.

A new seminary building was constructed in the 1950s, with space for c. 250 seminarians. The current number (2018), however, is only 15. On 15 April 2015, the Diocese of Reggio announced that it was putting the Episcopal Seminary up for sale, due to a serious financial emergency. On 28 April 2018, it was announced that the Episcopal Seminary would become one of the new seats for the University of Modena-Reggio (UNIMORE). It would become the home of the Facoltà di Educazione e scienze umane.

== Bishops of Reggio Emilia ==
=== to 600 ===
Protasius ? (328 ?)
Cromatius ? (345 ?)
Antoninus ? (362 ?)
Elias ? (379 ?)
Santinus ? (396 ?)
Carosio ? (413 ?)

- Faventius (attested 451)

Elpidius (5th century ?)

- Prosper (? – 25 June 466 ?)

[Tommaso (483)]

- Stefano (511 ?)
- Diodato or Deusdedit (488 or 533 ?)
- Lorenzo (500 ?)
- Teodosio or Teodoro (554 or 555 ?)
- Donodidio (577 ?)
- Adriano (599 ?)

=== 600 to 1000 ===
- Benenatus (622 ?)
- Paulus (644 ?)
- Lupiano or Ulpianus (666 ?)
- Mauritius (attested 679–680)
- Giovanni (681–684 or 714)
- Costantinus (690 ? or 715)
- Tommaso (701–714 ?)
- Sixtus or Callixtus (726 ?)
- Geminianus (751 or 752 ?)
- Apollinaris (attested 756–781)
- Adelmus (781 – after 800)
- Norpertus (814–835)
- Vitale (c. 836–842)
- Robertus (842–844)
- Sigifredus (844–857)
- Amon (860)
- Rotfridus (864–874 ?)
- Azzo (877)
- Paulus (II) (878–881)
- Aronne (881–885)
- Adelardus (890)
- Azzo (II) (890–899)
- Petrus (900–915)
- Girardus or Gottardus (915–920 or 930 ?)
- Fredolfo ? (920 ?)
- Gibertus (940)
- Heribaldus or Aribardus (942–944)
- Adelardus (945–952)
- Ermenaldo or Ermanno (962–978/979)
- Teuzo (979–1030)

=== 1000 to 1400 ===
- Sigifredus (II) (1031–1046?)

[Condelardo (1041)]
[Sifredo (1046)]
[Adalberto (1047–1049)]

- Conone (1050)
- Adalbero (1053–1060)
- Wolmar (Volmaro) (1062–1065)
- Gandolfo (1065–1085 deposed)

Anselm of Lucca (1082–1085) (Apostolic Administrator)

- Heribertus (1085–1092)
- Lodovico (1092 – after 1093)
- Bonus senior (Bonseniore) (attested 1098–1118)
- Adelmus or Adelelmo (attested 1123–1139)
- Alberio (1139–1163)
- Albericone or Alberico (1163–1187)
- Pietro (degli Albriconi) (1187–1210)
- Nicolò dei Maltraversi (1211–1243)
- Guglielmo da Fogliano (1244–1283)
  - Sede vacante (1283–1290)
- Guglielmo of Bobbio (22 June 1290 – 3 September 1301)
- Enrico de Casalorci (1302–1312)
- Guido de Baisio (1312–1329)
- Guido Roberti (1329–1332)
  - Tommasino Fogliani (1334–1336) (Apostolic administrator)
- Rolando Scarampi (1336–1337)
- Bartolomeo d'Asti (1339–1362)
- Lorenzo Pinotti (1363–1379)
- Serafino Tavacci, O.Min. (1379–1387)
- Ugolino da Sesso (1387–1394)

=== 1400 to 1600 ===
- Tebaldo da Sesso, O.S.B. (1394–1439)
- Giacomo Antonio della Torre (1439–1444)
- Battista Pallavicino (1444–1466)
- Antonio Beltrando (1466–1476)
- Bonfrancesco Arlotti (1477–1508)
- Gianluca Castellini (1508–1510)
- Ugo Rangone (1510–1540)
- Cardinal Marcello Cervini (1540–1544)
- Giorgio Andreasi (1544–1549)
- Giambattista Grossi (1549– 28 March 1569)
- Eustachio Locatelli, O.P. (1569–1575)
- Francesco Martelli (1575–1578)
- Benedetto Manzoli (9 April 1578 – 26 August 1585)
- Giulio Masetti (7 October 1585 – 2 September 1592)
- Claudio Rangoni (1592–1621)

=== 1600 to 1900 ===
- Alessandro d'Este (1621–1624)
- Paolo Coccapani (1625–1650)
- Rinaldo d'Este (1650–1660)
- Girolamo Codebò (1661)
- Giovanni Agostino Marliani (1662–1674)
- Augusto Bellincini (1675–1700)
- Ottavio Piccinardi (14 March 1701 – December 1722)
- Luigi Forni (Lodovico Forni) (12 May 1723 – 21 November 1750)
- Giovanni Maria Castelvetri (1750–1785)
- Francesco Maria D'Este (1785–1821)
- Angelo Maria Ficarelli (1822–1825)
- Filippo Cattani (1826–1849)
- Pietro Raffaelli (1849–1866)
- Carlo Macchi (27 March 1867 – 22 May 1873)
- Guido Rocca (25 July 1873 – 26 January 1886)
- Vincenzo Manicardi (7 June 1886 – 20 October 1901)

=== since 1900 ===
- Arturo Marchi (16 December 1901 – 29 April 1910 named Archbishop of Lucca)
- Eduardo Brettoni (12 October 1910 – 13 November 1945)
- Beniamino Socche (13 February 1946 – 16 January 1965)
- Gilberto Baroni (27 March 1965 – 30 September 1986 named Bishop of Reggio Emilie-Guastalla and served as such to 11 July 1989)
- Giovanni Paolo Gibertini, O.S.B. (1989–1998)
- Adriano Caprioli (1998–2012 Retired)
- Massimo Camisasca, F.S.C.B. (2012 – 10 January 2022)
- Giacomo Morandi (10 January 2022 – present)

== Other affiliated bishops ==
=== Coadjutor Bishops ===
- Gianluca Castellini (del Pozzo, Pontremoli) † (1503–1508)
- Giambattista Grossi (1545–1549)

=== Auxiliary Bishops ===
- Lorenzo Ghizzoni (2006–2012), appointed Archbishop of Ravenna-Cervia
- Camillo Ruini (1983–1991), appointed Vicar General (of Rome) and pro-archpriest (Cardinal later in 1991)

=== Other priests of this diocese who became bishops ===
- Emilio Maria Cottafavi, appointed Bishop of Tarquinia e Civitavecchia in 1926
- Francesco Pietro Tesauri, appointed Bishop of Isernia e Venafro in 1933
- Giovanni Mercati (priest here, 1889–1967), elevated to Cardinal in 1936 but did not become a bishop
- Sergio Pignedoli, appointed nuncio and titular archbishop in 1950; future Cardinal
- Giuseppe Bonacini, appointed Bishop of Bertinoro in 1959
- Luciano Monari, appointed Bishop of Piacenza-Bobbio in 1995
- Paolo Rabitti, appointed Archbishop of Ferrara-Comacchio in 2004
- Mauro Parmeggiani (priest here, 1985–1996), appointed Bishop of Tivoli in 2008
- Daniele Gianotti, appointed Bishop of Crema in 2017

== See also ==
- Roman Catholic Diocese of Guastalla
- Timeline of Reggio Emilia

== Books ==
=== Reference works for bishops ===
- Gams, Pius Bonifatius (1873). Series episcoporum Ecclesiae catholicae: quotquot innotuerunt a beato Petro apostolo (in Latin). Ratisbon: Typis et Sumptibus Georgii Josephi Manz. pp. 745–747.
- Eubel, Conradus, ed. (1913). Hierarchia catholica (in Latin). Vol. 1 (second ed.). Münster: Libreria Regensbergiana. (in Latin)
- Eubel, Conradus, ed. (1914). Hierarchia catholica (in Latin). Vol. 2 (second ed.). Münster: Libreria Regensbergiana.
- Eubel, Conradus; Gulik, Guilelmus (1923). Hierarchia catholica (in Latin). Vol. 3 (second ed.). Münster: Libreria Regensbergiana.
- Gauchat, Patritius (Patrice) (1935). Hierarchia catholica. Vol. IV (1592–1667). Münster: Libraria Regensbergiana.
- Ritzler, Remigius; Sefrin, Pirminus (1952). Hierarchia catholica medii et recentis aevi. Vol. V (1667–1730). Patavii: Messagero di S. Antonio.
- Ritzler, Remigius; Sefrin, Pirminus (1958). Hierarchia catholica medii et recentis aevi. Vol. VI (1730–1799). Patavii: Messagero di S. Antonio.
- Ritzler, Remigius; Sefrin, Pirminus (1968). Hierarchia Catholica medii et recentioris aevi (in Latin). Vol. VII (1800–1846). Monasterii: Libreria Regensburgiana.
- Remigius Ritzler; Pirminus Sefrin (1978). Hierarchia catholica Medii et recentioris aevi (in Latin). Vol. VIII (1846–1903). Il Messaggero di S. Antonio.
- Pięta, Zenon (2002). Hierarchia catholica medii et recentioris aevi (in Latin). Vol. IX (1903–1922). Padua: Messagero di San Antonio. ISBN 978-88-250-1000-8.

=== Studies ===
- Cappelletti, Giuseppe (1859). Le chiese d'Italia: dalla loro origine sino ai nostri giorni (in Italian). Vol. Tomo decimoquinto (15). Venezia: G. Antonelli. pp. 359–399.
- Costi, Giovanni; Giovanelli, Giuseppe (2012). Storia della diocesi di Reggio Emilia-Guastalla: Dal Medioevo alla riforma del Concilio di Trento (in Italian). Brescia: Morcelliana. ISBN 978-88-372-2556-8.
- Cottafavi, Emilio (1907). I seminari della diocesi di Reggio nell'Emilia: l'università reggiana nel secolo XVIII (in Italian) (seconda ed.). Reggio Emilia: Artigianeli.
- Kehr, Paul Fridolin (1906). Italia Pontificia Vol. V: Aemilia, sive Provincia Ravennas. Berlin: Weidmann, pp. 364–383. (in Latin).
- Lanzoni, Francesco (1927). Le diocesi d'Italia dalle origini al principio del secolo VII (an. 604). Faenza: F. Lega, pp. 793–802. (in Italian)
- Saccani, Giovanni (1902). I vescovi di Reggio-Emilia, Cronotassi, Reggio Emilia: Tip. Artigianelli 1902. (in Italian)
- Schwartz, Gerhard (1907). Die Besetzung der Bistümer Reichsitaliens unter den sächsischen und salischen Kaisern: mit den Listen der Bischöfe, 951-1122. Leipzig: B.G. Teubner. (in German) pp. 195–199.
- Ughelli, Ferdinando; Coleti, Niccolo (1717). Italia sacra sive de Episcopis Italiae (in Latin). Vol. Tomus secundus (II) (secunda ed.). Venice: Apud Sebastianum Coleti. pp. 238–320.
