= Battista Pallavicino =

Italian Roman Catholic prelate

Most Reverend Battista Pallavicino
- Bishop of Reggio Emilia
- Church: Catholic Church
- Diocese: Diocese of Reggio Emilia
- In office: 1444–1466
- Predecessor: Giacomo Antonio della Torre
- Successor: Antonio Beltrando

Personal details
- Died: 12 May 1466 Reggio Emilia, Italy

Battista Pallavicino (died 12 May 1466) was a Roman Catholic prelate who served as Bishop of Reggio Emilia (1444–1466).

== Biography ==
On 19 October 1444, Battista Pallavicino was appointed during the papacy of Pope Eugene IV as Bishop of Reggio Emilia.

Pallavicino died suddenly on 12 May 1466 of apoplexy (brain hemorrhage). He was buried in the crypt of the cathedral.

== Works ==
Battista Pallavicino was the author of a number of works:

- Baptistae Marchionis Pallavicini Episcopi Regiensis Historia flendae Crucis, et funeris Domini nostri Jesu Christi, ad Eugenium IV S. P. Parma 1477.
- Epistola ad Albertum Parisium Reipubl. Bonon. Cancellarium. Regii die 1 Decembris 1465.
- Baptistae Pallavicini Epistola ad patruum suum, data in Siena l'anno 1443.
- Ejusdem B. M. P. Fabula. It begins "Jam senior dura forte jacet leo". [twenty-eight poems in honor of the Blessed Virgin Mary]
- B. Palavicini Ep. Regien. ad Pium II Pont. Max. Gratulatio cum pollicitatione liberali. It begins, "Maxime Christicolum recto quo bella jubente".
- Baptistae Marchionis Pallavicini Episcopi Regien. Salutano cum deprecatione in Mariam gratia plenam ad illustrem atque inclytum D. Nicolaum Esten. It begins, "Virgo decus mundi", {in hexameters]. Regìi sexto Aprilis mcccclviiiI .

== External links and additional sources ==
- Affò, Ireneo (1789). Memorie degli scrittori e letterati parmigiani (in Italian). Vol. II. Stamperia Reale. pp. 242–258.
- Forner, Fabio (2004). "Pio II e Battista Pallavicino, vescovo di Reggio nell'Emilia," in: Andrea Canova (ed.), Rhegii Lingobardiae. Studi sulla cultura a Reggio Emilia in età umanistica (Reggio Emilia 2004), pp. 93–109. (in Italian)
- Saccani, Giovanni (1902). I vescovi di Reggio-Emilia, Cronotassi, Reggio Emilia: Tip. Artigianelli 1902. (in Italian) (pp. 105–108)

Catholic Church titles
Preceded by Giacomo Antonio della Torre	Bishop of Reggio Emilia; 1444–1466	Succeeded by Antonio Beltrando
