= Julius Benigni =

Roman Catholic prelate

Most Reverend Julius Benigni
- Secretary of the Congregation of Rites; Titular Archbishop of Thessalonica
- Church: Catholic Church
- In office: 1625–1628

Orders
- Consecration: 21 May 1623 by Marco Antonio Gozzadini

Personal details
- Died: 1 June 1628

Julius Benigni, (died 1 June 1628), was a Roman Catholic prelate who served as Secretary of the Congregation of Rites (1625–1628) and Titular Archbishop of Thessalonica (1623–1628).

== Biography ==
On 10 May 1623, Julius Benigni was appointed during the papacy of Pope Gregory XV as Titular Archbishop of Thessalonica. On 21 May 1623, he was consecrated bishop by Marco Antonio Gozzadini, Cardinal-Priest of Sant'Eusebio, with Virgilio Cappone, Bishop of Mileto and Alessandro Bosco, Bishop of Gerace, serving as co-consecrators. On 8 November 1625, he was appointed during the papacy of Pope Urban VIII as Secretary of the Congregation of Rites. He served as Secretary of the Congregation of Rites until his death on 1 June 1628.

== External links and additional sources ==
- Cheney, David M. "Thessalonica (Titular See)". Catholic-Hierarchy.org. (for Chronology of Bishops (for Chronology of Bishops) ^{[self-published]}
- Chow, Gabriel. "Titular Metropolitan See of Thessalonica (Greece)". GCatholic.org. (for Chronology of Bishops (for Chronology of Bishops) ^{[self-published]}

Catholic Church titles
Preceded by Giovanni Doria	Titular Archbishop of Thessalonica; 1623–1628	Succeeded by Giovanni Battista Maria Pallotta
Preceded by	Secretary of the Congregation of Rites; 1625–1628	Succeeded by
