= Giovanni Doria (bishop) =

- Cardinal, Archbishop of Palermo
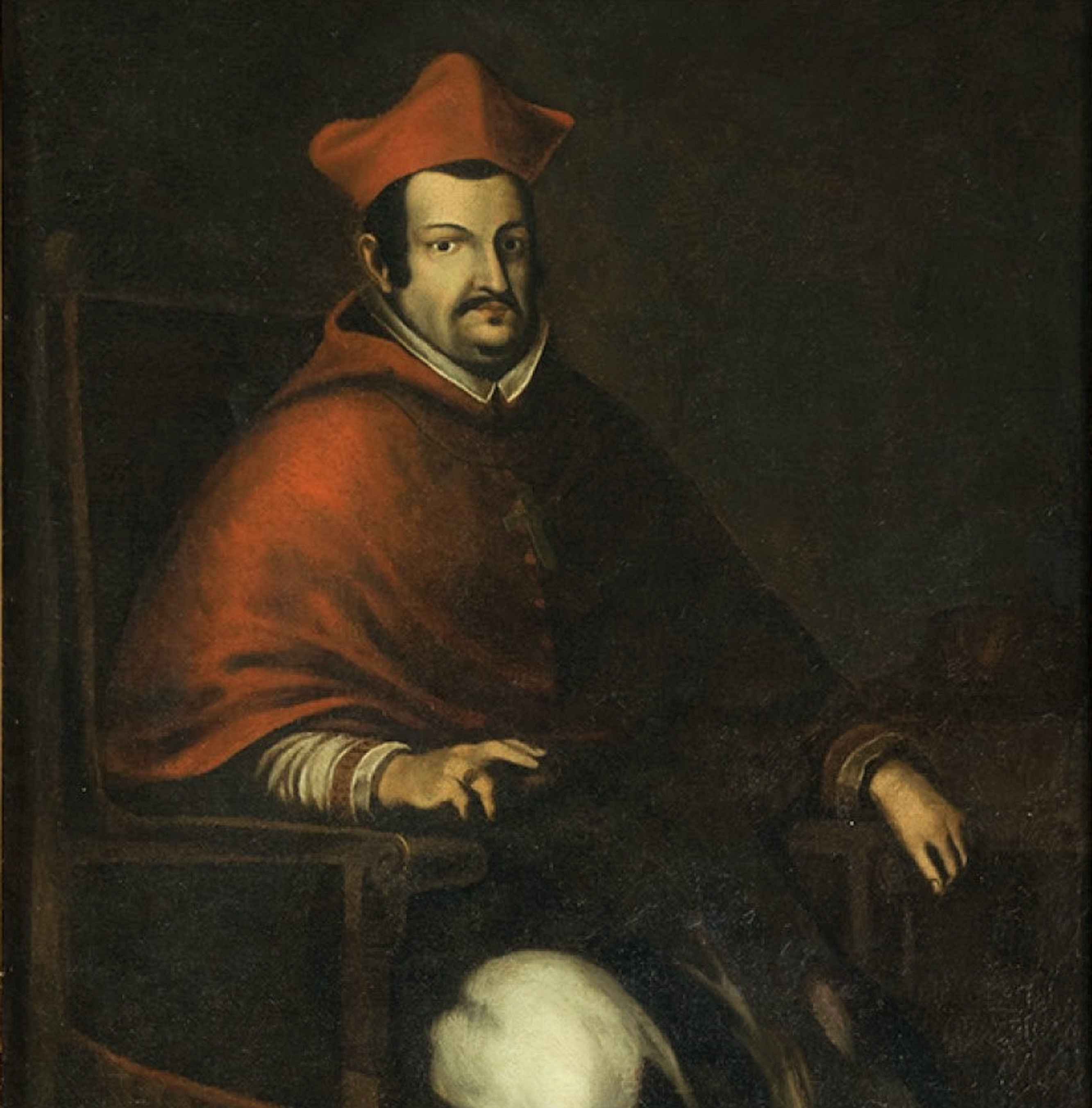

Orders
- Consecration: 4 May 1608 by Pope Paul V
- Rank: Cardinal-Priest

Personal details
- Born: 15 March 1573 Genoa
- Died: 19 October 1642 (aged 69) Palermo, Sicily
- Buried: Palermo Cathedral
- Parents: Giovanni Andrea Doria, Princess Zenobia Doria del Carretto

Giovanni Doria (24 March 1573, Genoa – Palermo, Sicily, 19 October 1642), called Giannettino, the son of Giovanni Andrea Doria, 6th Prince of Melfi, and Princess Zenobia Doria del Carretto, 5th Princess of Melfi.

== Biography ==
Doria studied philosophy and theology in Spain being promoted to the Cardinalate at the instance of King Felipe II of Spain. Once king Philip II died, he was created cardinal deacon, aged 31, in the consistory of 9 June 1604. Doria was granted permission to receive the sacred orders outside the Ember days on 9 December 1604. He participated in both the March–April 1605 papal conclave, which elected Pope Leo XI, and in the May 1605 papal conclave, which elected Pope Paul V.

Doria received the red hat, the deaconry of S. Adriano, on 5 December 1605 and the position of Abbot commendatario of San Fruttuoso in Camogli. He was elected titular archbishop of Thessalonica and named coadjutor, with right of succession, of Palermo, on 4 February 1608. He was consecrated on 4 May 1608, at Rome, by Pope Paul V.

He succeeded to the see of Palermo, Sicily on 5 July 1608. He served as Viceroy of Sicily and lieutenant of the king of Spain from 8 February 1610 to March 1611, July to August 1616, from 1 August 1624 to 1626 and from 1639 to June 1641.

Doria participated in the 1621 papal conclave, which elected Pope Gregory XV. He next participated in the 1623 papal conclave, which elected Pope Urban VIII. On 2 October 1623 Doria opted for the order of cardinal priests and the title of San Pietro in Montorio.

He celebrated the discovery of the relics of Saint Rosalia, and promoted her cult as patroness and protector of Palermo.

While bishop, he was the principal consecrator of Manuel Esteban Muniera, Bishop of Cefalù (1621).

== Death and burial ==
He died on 19 November 1642 in Palermo and was buried in the chapel of S. Rosalia, in the metropolitan cathedral of Palermo.

== Sources ==
Catholic Church titles
Preceded by Alessandro d'Este	Cardinal-Deacon of Sant'Adriano al Foro; 1605–1623	Succeeded by Louis de Nogaret de La Valette
Preceded by Tomaso Frinsinio	Titular Archbishop of Thessalonica; 1608	Succeeded by Julius Benigni
Preceded by Diego Haëdo	Archbishop of Palermo; 1608–1642	Succeeded by Fernando Andrade Castro
Preceded by Cesare Gherardi	Cardinal-Priest of San Pietro in Montorio; 1623–1642	Succeeded by Gil Carrillo de Albornoz
