= Giulio Masetti (bishop) =

Roman Catholic prelate

Most Reverend Giulio Masetti
- Bishop of Reggio Emilia
- Church: Catholic Church
- Diocese: Diocese of Reggio Emilia
- In office: 1585–1592
- Predecessor: Benedetto Manzoli
- Successor: Claudio Rangoni

Orders
- Consecration: by Giulio Antonio Santorio

Personal details
- Died: 2 September 1592 Reggio Emilia, Italy

Giulio Masetti (died 2 September 1592) was a Roman Catholic prelate who served as Bishop of Reggio Emilia (1585–1592).

== Biography ==
On 7 October 1585, Giulio Masetti was appointed during the papacy of Pope Sixtus V as Bishop of Reggio Emilia. On 13 October 1585, he was consecrated bishop by Giulio Antonio Santorio, Cardinal-Priest of San Bartolomeo all'Isola. He served as Bishop of Reggio Emilia until his death on 2 September 1592.

While bishop, he was the principal co-consecrator of Girolamo Bernerio, Bishop of Ascoli Piceno.

== External links and additional sources ==
- Cheney, David M. "Diocese of Reggio Emilia-Guastalla". Catholic-Hierarchy.org. (for Chronology of Bishops) ^{[self-published]}
- Chow, Gabriel. "Diocese of Reggio Emilia-Guastalla (Italy)". GCatholic.org. (for Chronology of Bishops) ^{[self-published]}

Catholic Church titles
| Preceded by Benedetto Manzoli | Bishop of Reggio Emilia; 1585–1592 | Succeeded by Claudio Rangoni |
