= Gianluca Castellini =

Most Reverend Gianluca Castellini
- Bishop of Reggio Emilia
- Church: Catholic Church
- Diocese: Diocese of Reggio Emilia
- In office: 1508–1510
- Predecessor: Bonfrancesco Arlotti
- Successor: Ugo Rangone

Personal details
- Died: 1510 Reggio Emilia, Italy

Gianluca Castellini del Pozzo (died 1510) was a Roman Catholic prelate who served as Bishop of Reggio Emilia (1508–1510).

== Biography ==
On 8 March 1503, Gianluca Castellini was appointed during the papacy of Pope Alexander VI as Coadjutor Bishop of Reggio Emilia. On 7 January 1508, he succeeded to the chair. He served as Bishop of Reggio Emilia until his death in 1510.

== External links and additional sources ==
- Cheney, David M. "Diocese of Reggio Emilia-Guastalla". Catholic-Hierarchy.org. (for Chronology of Bishops) ^{[self-published]}
- Chow, Gabriel. "Diocese of Reggio Emilia-Guastalla (Italy)". GCatholic.org. (for Chronology of Bishops) ^{[self-published]}

Catholic Church titles
Preceded by Bonfrancesco Arlotti	Bishop of Reggio Emilia; 1508–1510	Succeeded by Ugo Rangone
