= Giovanni de La Bronda =

Italian Roman Catholic prelate

Most Reverend Giovanni de La Bronda
- Bishop of Ampurias e Civita
- Church: Catholic Church
- Diocese: Diocese of Ampurias e Civita
- In office: 1622–1633
- Predecessor: Giacomo Passamar
- Successor: Andrea Manca

Orders
- Consecration: 13 December 1622 by Marco Antonio Gozzadini

Personal details
- Born: 1560
- Died: 1633 (age 71)

Giovanni de La Bronda (1560–1633) was a Roman Catholic prelate who served as Bishop of Ampurias e Civita (1622–1633).

== Biography ==
Giovanni de La Bronda was born in 1562. In the papal consistory of 19 September 1622, he was appointed Bishop of Ampurias e Civita by Pope Gregory XV. On 13 December 1622, he was consecrated bishop by Marco Antonio Gozzadini, Cardinal-Priest of Sant'Eusebio, with Alessandro Bosco, Bishop of Gerace, and Girolamo Tantucci, Bishop of Grosseto, serving as co-consecrators. He served as Bishop of Ampurias e Civita until his death in 1633.

Catholic Church titles
Preceded by Giacomo Passamar	Bishop of Ampurias e Civita; 1622–1633	Succeeded by Andrea Manca
