= Paolo Coccapani =

1xth-century Roman Catholic bishop

Most Reverend Paolo Coccapani
- Bishop of Reggio Emilia
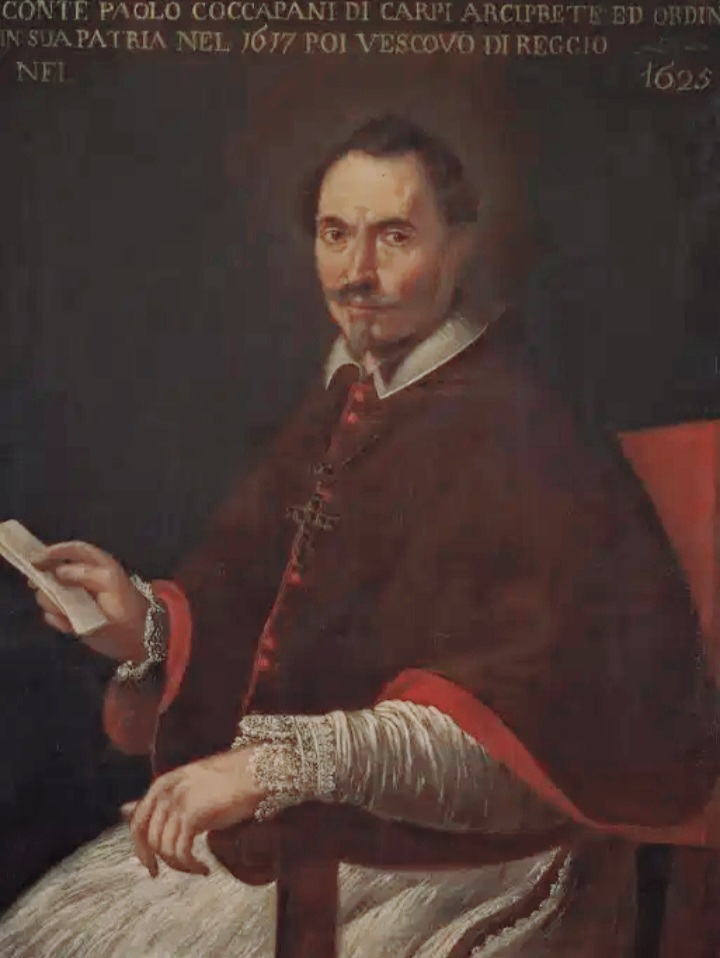
- Church: Catholic Church
- In office: 1625–1650
- Predecessor: Alessandro d'Este
- Successor: Rinaldo d'Este

Orders
- Consecration: 13 Apr 1625 by Guido Bentivoglio d'Aragona

Personal details
- Born: 1584 Ferrare, Italy
- Died: 26 Jun 1650 (age 66)

Paolo Coccapani (1584–1650) was a Roman Catholic prelate who served as Bishop of Reggio Emilia (1625–1650).

== Biography ==
Paolo Coccapani was born in Ferrare, Italy in 1584. On 7 Apr 1625, he was appointed during the papacy of Pope Urban VIII as Bishop of Reggio Emilia. On 13 Apr 1625, he was consecrated bishop by Guido Bentivoglio d'Aragona, Cardinal-Priest of Santa Maria del Popolo. He served as Bishop of Reggio Emilia until his death on 26 Jun 1650.

While bishop, he was the principal consecrator of Opizio d'Este, Bishop of Modena (1640).

== External links and additional sources ==
- Cheney, David M. "Diocese of Reggio Emilia-Guastalla". Catholic-Hierarchy.org. (for Chronology of Bishops) ^{[self-published]}
- Chow, Gabriel. "Diocese of Reggio Emilia-Guastalla (Italy)". GCatholic.org. (for Chronology of Bishops) ^{[self-published]}

Catholic Church titles
Preceded by Alessandro d'Este	Bishop of Reggio Emilia; 1625–1650	Succeeded by Rinaldo d'Este
