= Eustachio Locatelli =

Roman Catholic prelate

The Most Reverend Eustachio Locatelli
- Bishop of Reggio Emilia
- Church: Catholic Church
- Diocese: Diocese of Reggio Emilia
- In office: 1569–1575
- Predecessor: Giambattista Grossi
- Successor: Francesco Martelli

Orders
- Consecration: 29 April 1569 by Scipione Rebiba

Personal details
- Died: 1575 Reggio Emilia, Italy

Eustachio Locatelli (died 1575) was a Roman Catholic prelate who served as Bishop of Reggio Emilia (1569–1575).

== Biography ==
Locatelli was ordained a priest in the Order of Preachers. On 15 April 1569, he was appointed during the papacy of Pope Pius V as Bishop of Reggio Emilia. On 29 April 1569, he was consecrated bishop by Scipione Rebiba, Cardinal-Priest of Sant'Angelo in Pescheria, with Antonio Ganguzia, Bishop of Vieste, and Felice Peretti Montalto, Bishop of Sant'Agata de' Goti, serving as co-consecrators. He served as Bishop of Reggio Emilia until his death on 14 October 1575.

While bishop, he was the principal co-consecrator of: Maurice MacBrien, Bishop of Emly (1571); Vincenzo de Doncelli, Bishop of Valva e Sulmona (1571); and Pietro Cancellieri, Bishop of Lipari (1571).

== External links and additional sources ==
- Cheney, David M. "Diocese of Reggio Emilia-Guastalla". Catholic-Hierarchy.org. (for Chronology of Bishops) ^{[self-published]}
- Chow, Gabriel. "Diocese of Reggio Emilia-Guastalla (Italy)". GCatholic.org. (for Chronology of Bishops) ^{[self-published]}

Catholic Church titles
| Preceded by Giambattista Grossi | Bishop of Reggio Emilia; 1569–1575 | Succeeded by Francesco Martelli |
