= Ottavio Piccinardi =

Most Reverend Ottavio Piccinardi
- Bishop of Reggio Emilia
- Church: Catholic Church
- Diocese: Diocese of Reggio Emilia
- In office: 1701–1722
- Predecessor: Augusto Bellincini
- Successor: Luigi Forni

Orders
- Consecration: 3 Apr 1701

Personal details
- Born: 16 Aug 1661 Cremona, Italy
- Died: Dec 1722 (age 61) Reggio Emilia, Italy

Ottavio Piccinardi or Ottavio Picenardi (1661–1722) was a Roman Catholic prelate who served as Bishop of Reggio Emilia (1701–1722).

== Biography ==
Piccinardi was born in Cremona, Italy on 16 August 1661. On 14 March 1701, he was appointed during the papacy of Pope Clement XI as Bishop of Reggio Emilia. On 3 April 1701, he was consecrated bishop. He served as Bishop of Reggio Emilia until his death in December 1722.

== External links and additional sources ==
- Cheney, David M. "Diocese of Reggio Emilia-Guastalla". Catholic-Hierarchy.org. (for Chronology of Bishops) ^{[self-published]}
- Chow, Gabriel. "Diocese of Reggio Emilia-Guastalla (Italy)". GCatholic.org. (for Chronology of Bishops) ^{[self-published]}

Catholic Church titles
Preceded by Augusto Bellincini	Bishop of Reggio Emilia; 1701–1722	Succeeded by Luigi Forni
