= Francesco Martelli (bishop) =

Roman Catholic prelate

Most Reverend Francesco Martelli
- Bishop of Reggio Emilia
- Church: Catholic Church
- Diocese: Diocese of Reggio Emilia
- In office: 1575–1578
- Predecessor: Eustachio Locatelli
- Successor: Benedetto Manzoli

Personal details
- Died: 9 March 1578 Reggio Emilia, Italy

Francesco Martelli (died 9 March 1578) was a Roman Catholic prelate who served as Bishop of Reggio Emilia (1575–1578).

== Biography ==
On 15 April 1569, Francesco Martelli was appointed during the papacy of Pope Pius V as Bishop of Reggio Emilia. He served as Bishop of Reggio Emilia until his death on 9 March 1578.

== External links and additional sources ==
- Cheney, David M. "Diocese of Reggio Emilia-Guastalla". Catholic-Hierarchy.org. (for Chronology of Bishops) ^{[self-published]}
- Chow, Gabriel. "Diocese of Reggio Emilia-Guastalla (Italy)". GCatholic.org. (for Chronology of Bishops) ^{[self-published]}

Catholic Church titles
Preceded by Eustachio Locatelli	Bishop of Reggio Emilia; 1575–1578	Succeeded by Benedetto Manzoli
