= Castelsardo Cathedral =

Cathedral in Sardinia, Italy

Coordinates: 40°55′1″N 8°42′45″E

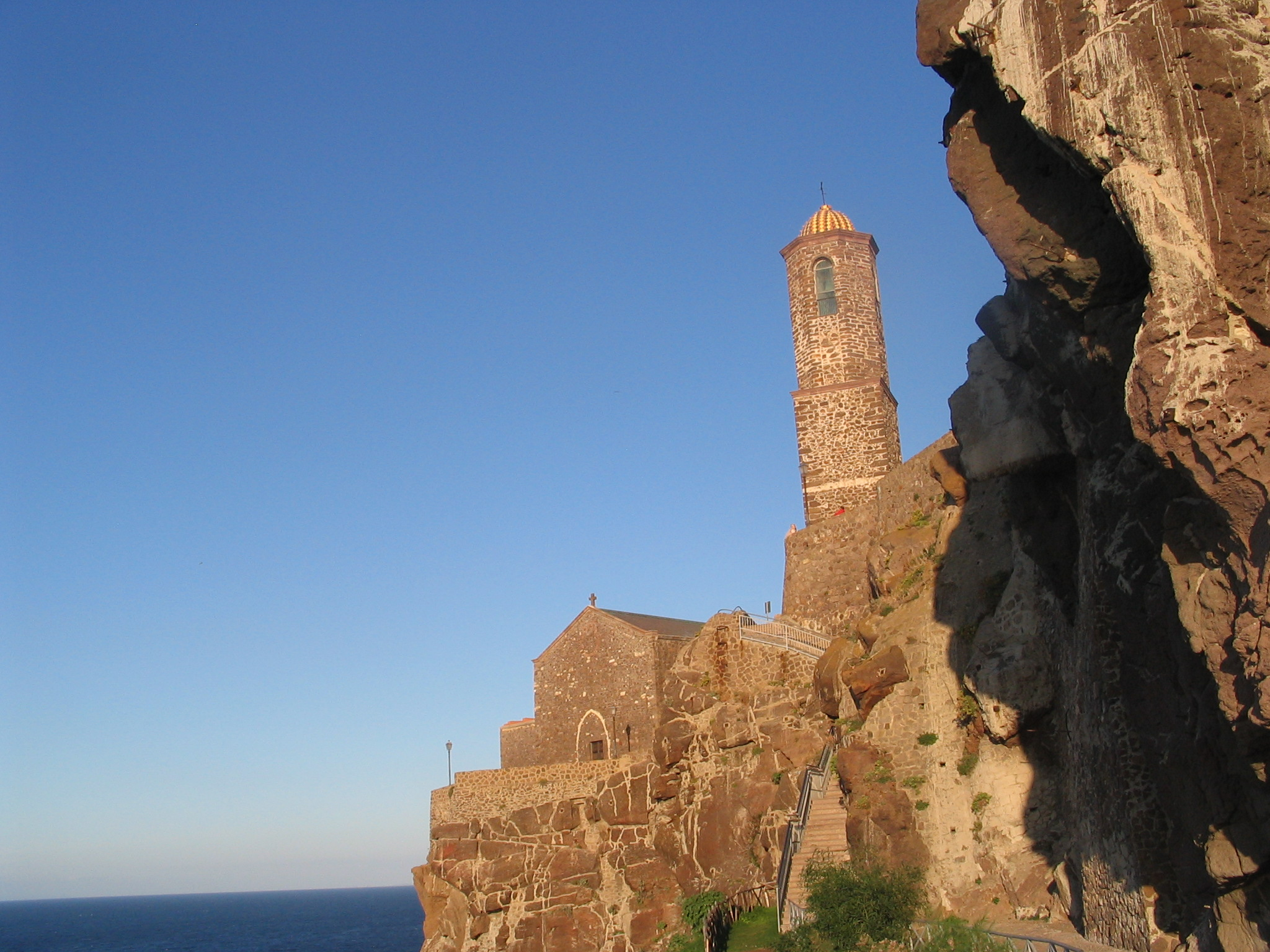
Castelsardo Cathedral

Castelsardo Cathedral (Italian: Concattedrale di Sant'Antonio abate) is a cathedral in Castelsardo, northern Sardinia, Italy, and is dedicated to Saint Anthony the Great. It became the seat of the bishop of Ampurias in 1503. In 1839 the diocese of Ampurias was merged into that of Tempio, and the episcopal seat moved to Tempio Cathedral, when that of Castelsardo became a co-cathedral, as it remains in the present diocese of Tempio-Ampurias.

== Description ==
The current building dates from the reconstruction begun in 1597 that lasted until the 18th century. The cathedral is a mixture of Catalan Gothic and Renaissance elements, and overlooks the sea directly. The interior is on the Latin cross plan, with a single nave with barrel vaults, side chapels and transept. The crossing has a cross vault on four pilasters with sculpted capitals. The church has a tall, octagonal bell-tower, topped by a small dome decorated with majolica, and a "relatively large terrace".

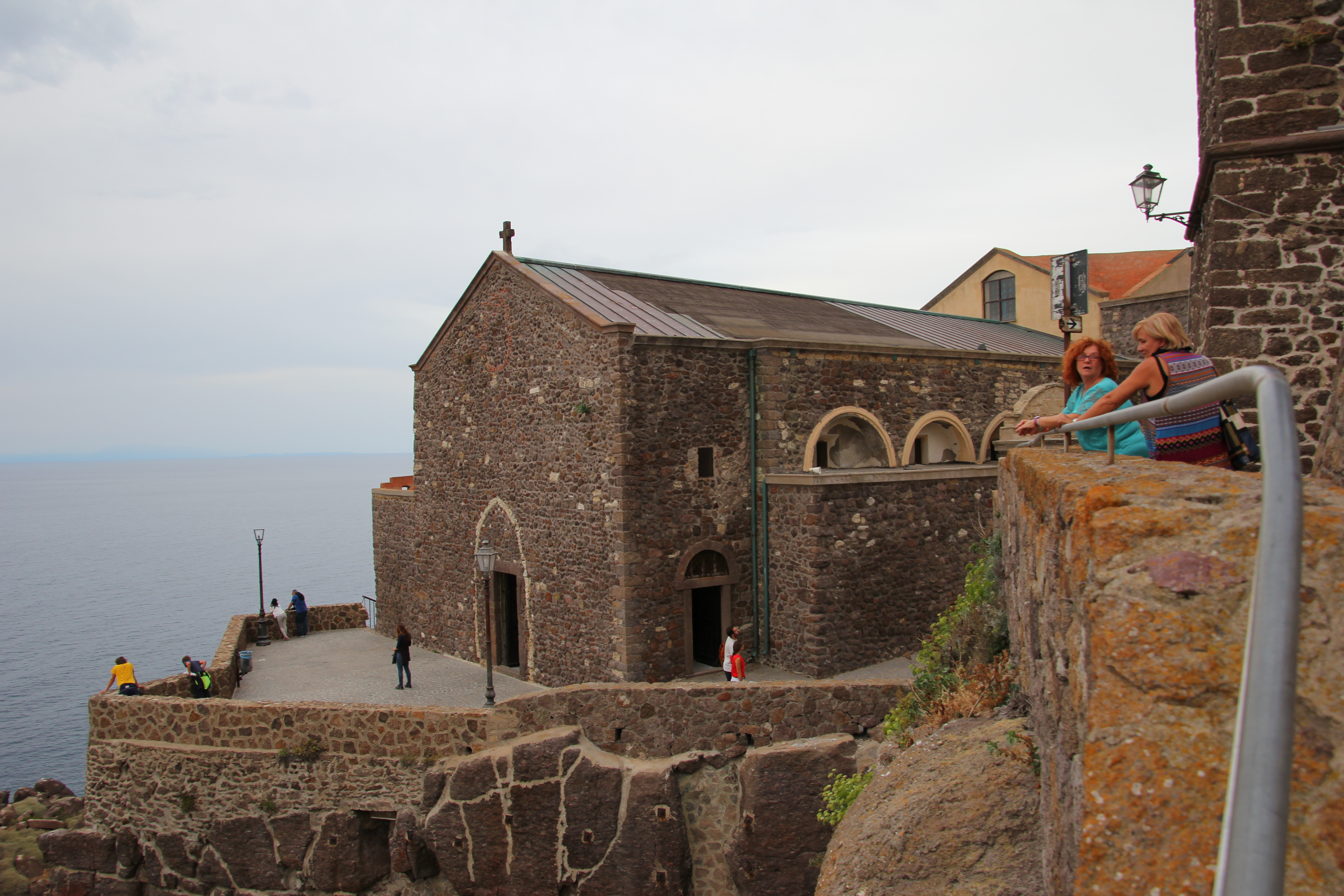
The co-cathedral of Castelsardo, showing the terrace

The presbytery is raised, and has a marble balustrade. The apse, with a cross vault decorated with stars, houses the marble high altar of 1810, characterized by the church's main attraction, the Enthroned Madonna and Child, a painting of the 15th century, attributed to the Master of Castelsardo. Also by the latter artist is a St. Michael the Archangel, displayed in the crypt, now home to the diocesan museum.
