= Giambattista Grossi =

Roman Catholic prelate

Most Reverend Giambattista Grossi
- Bishop of Reggio Emilia
- Church: Catholic Church
- Diocese: Diocese of Reggio Emilia
- In office: 1549–1569
- Predecessor: Giorgio Andreasi
- Successor: Eustachio Locatelli

Orders
- Consecration: 5 May 1549 by Gian Pietro Ferretti

Personal details
- Born: Mantua, Duchy of Mantua
- Died: 28 March 1569 Reggio Emilia, Duchy of Ferrara

Giambattista Grossi (died 28 March 1569) was a Roman Catholic prelate who served as Bishop of Reggio Emilia (1549–1569).

== Biography ==
Giambattista Grossi was born in Mantua to a noble family. His mother was the sister of Giorgio Andreasi, who later became bishop of Reggio Emilia. Gianbattista followed in his uncle's footsteps and became dean of the chapter.

On 4 December 1545, Giambattista Grossi was appointed during the papacy of Pope Paul III as Coadjutor Bishop of Reggio Emilia, because his uncle was quite old and ill. On 22 January 1549 Giorgio Andreasi died and he succeeded to the bishopric. On 5 May 1549 Giambattista Grossi was consecrated as bishop in the Reggio Emilia Cathedral by Gian Pietro Ferretti.

In 1551 and 1552, and later in 1564, he participated to the Council of Trent. In 1558, he issued a constitution promoting a temperate lifestyle among the clergy and providing guidance for parish priests in their pastoral responsibilities (De vita et honestade Clericorum). In October 1565 he published in the Cathedral the decrees of the Council of Trent. He established the Seminary as well, levying a tax on all ecclesiastical benefices to support its foundation.

He served as Bishop of Reggio Emilia until his death on 28 March 1569. He was buried in that cathedral.

== External links and additional sources ==
- Cheney, David M. "Diocese of Reggio Emilia-Guastalla". Catholic-Hierarchy.org. (for Chronology of Bishops) ^{[self-published]}
- Chow, Gabriel. "Diocese of Reggio Emilia-Guastalla (Italy)". GCatholic.org. (for Chronology of Bishops) ^{[self-published]}

Catholic Church titles
Preceded by Giorgio Andreasi	Bishop of Reggio Emilia; 1549–1569	Succeeded by Eustachio Locatelli
