= Bonfrancesco Arlotti =

Most Reverend Bonfrancesco Arlotti
- Bishop of Reggio Emilia
- Church: Catholic Church
- Diocese: Diocese of Reggio Emilia
- In office: 1477–1508
- Predecessor: Antonio Beltrando
- Successor: Gianluca Castellini

Personal details
- Died: 7 January 1508 Reggio Emilia, Italy

Bonfrancesco Arlotti (died 7 January 1508) was a Roman Catholic prelate who served as Bishop of Reggio Emilia (1477–1508).

On 9 June 1477, Arlotti was appointed during the papacy of Pope Sixtus IV as Bishop of Reggio Emilia. He served as Bishop of Reggio Emilia until his death on 7 January 1508.

== External links and additional sources ==
- Cheney, David M. "Diocese of Reggio Emilia-Guastalla". Catholic-Hierarchy.org. (for Chronology of Bishops) ^{[self-published]}
- Chow, Gabriel. "Diocese of Reggio Emilia-Guastalla (Italy)". GCatholic.org. (for Chronology of Bishops) ^{[self-published]}

Catholic Church titles
| Preceded by Antonio Beltrando | Bishop of Reggio Emilia; 1477–1508 | Succeeded by Gianluca Castellini |
