= Master of Castelsardo =

Sardinian painter

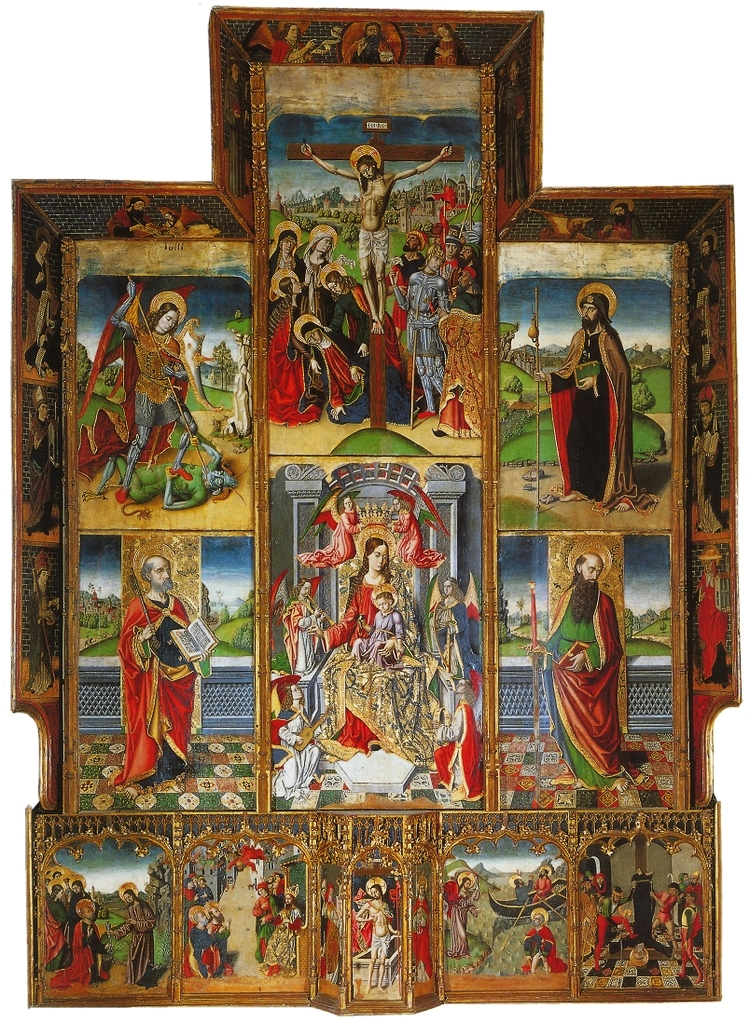
Retable by the Master of Castelsardo, church of San Pietro, Tuili

The Master of Castelsardo was a painter active in Sardinia at the end of the 15th and the beginning of the sixteenth century. His name comes from a painting of the Madonna and Child currently in the cathedral of Castelsardo; other than that, the Master's identity is unknown: he has been associated by some either with Gioacchino Cavaro, a Sardinian artist from Cagliari, or with Martì Tornèr, a Mallorcan artist of Valencian descent.

His influence appears to be primarily Catalan and he perhaps started painting in Barcelona around 1490; some scholars have identified him with Gioacchino Cavaro, though others dispute this. His other works included the retablos in the church of St. Peter at Tuili (executed between 1489 and 1500), in the church of Santa Rosalia at Cagliari, the Trinity Retablo (like the previous one, originally commissioned for the Frasciscan convent at Tallano, in Corsica, now in the basilica of Saccargia).
