= Benedetto Manzoli =

Roman Catholic prelate

Most Reverend Benedetto Manzoli
- Bishop of Reggio Emilia
- Church: Catholic Church
- Diocese: Diocese of Reggio Emilia
- In office: 1578–1585
- Predecessor: Francesco Martelli
- Successor: Giulio Masetti (bishop)

Personal details
- Died: 26 August 1585 Reggio Emilia, Italy

Benedetto Manzoli (died 26 August 1585) was a Roman Catholic prelate who served as Bishop of Reggio Emilia (1578–1585).

== Biography ==
On 9 April 1578, Benedetto Manzoli was appointed during the papacy of Pope Gregory XIII as Bishop of Reggio Emilia. He served as Bishop of Reggio Emilia until his death on 9 March 1578.

== External links and additional sources ==
- Cheney, David M. "Diocese of Reggio Emilia-Guastalla". Catholic-Hierarchy.org. (for Chronology of Bishops) ^{[self-published]}
- Chow, Gabriel. "Diocese of Reggio Emilia-Guastalla (Italy)". GCatholic.org. (for Chronology of Bishops) ^{[self-published]}

Catholic Church titles
Preceded by Francesco Martelli	Bishop of Reggio Emilia; 1578–1585	Succeeded by Giulio Masetti (bishop)
