= Claudio Rangoni (bishop of Reggio Emilia) =

Roman Catholic prelate

The Most Reverend Claudio Rangoni
- Bishop of Reggio Emilia
- Church: Catholic Church
- In office: 1592–1606
- Predecessor: Giulio Masetti (bishop)
- Successor: Alessandro d'Este
- Previous post: Apostolic Nuncio to Poland (1598-1606)

Orders
- Consecration: 10 January 1593 by Girolamo Bernerio

Personal details
- Born: 26 September 1559 Modena, Italy
- Died: 2 September 1621 (age 61) Reggio Emilia, Italy

Claudio Rangoni (26 September 1559 – 2 September 1621) was a Roman Catholic prelate who served as Bishop of Reggio Emilia (1592–1606) and Apostolic Nuncio to Poland (1598–1606).

== Biography ==
Claudio Rangoni was born in Modena, Italy on 26 September 1559. On 16 December 1592, he was appointed during the papacy of Pope Clement VIII as Bishop of Reggio Emilia. On 10 January 1593, he was consecrated bishop by Girolamo Bernerio, Bishop of Ascoli Piceno, with Giovanni Domenico Marcot, Archbishop of Split, and Feliciano Ninguarda, Bishop of Como, serving as co-consecrators. On 20 October 1598, he was appointed during the papacy of Pope Clement VIII as Apostolic Nuncio to Poland. He served as Bishop of Reggio Emilia and Apostolic Nuncio to Poland until his resignation on 16 September 1606. He died on 2 September 1621.

== Episcopal succession ==
While bishop, he was the principal consecrator of:

- Wawrzyniec Gembicki, Bishop of Chelmno (1601);
- Jerzy Zamoyski, Bishop of Chełm (1601);
- Simon Rudnicki, Bishop of Warmia (1605);

and the principal co-consecrator of:

- Antonio Seneca, Bishop of Anagni (1607).

== Notes ==
Through Wawrzyniec Gembicki, he is credited as the progenitor of a cadet branch within the Rebiba episcopal line, which is also the episcopal genealogy of Pope Pius XI.

== External links and additional sources ==
- Cheney, David M. "Diocese of Reggio Emilia-Guastalla". Catholic-Hierarchy.org. (for Chronology of Bishops) ^{[self-published]}
- Chow, Gabriel. "Diocese of Reggio Emilia-Guastalla (Italy)". GCatholic.org. (for Chronology of Bishops) ^{[self-published]}
- Cheney, David M. "Nunciature to Poland". Catholic-Hierarchy.org. (for Chronology of Bishops) ^{[self-published]}
- Chow, Gabriel. "Apostolic Nunciature Poland". GCatholic.org. (for Chronology of Bishops) ^{[self-published]}

Catholic Church titles
Preceded by Alberto Bolognetti	Apostolic Nuncio to Poland; 1598–1606	Succeeded by Francesco Simonetta
Preceded by Giulio Masetti (bishop)	Bishop of Reggio Emilia; 1592–1606	Succeeded by Alessandro d'Este
