= Giorgio Andreasi =

Roman Catholic prelate

Most Reverend Giorgio Andreasi
- Bishop of Reggio Emilia
- Church: Catholic Church
- Diocese: Diocese of Reggio Emilia
- In office: 1544–1549
- Predecessor: Marcello Cervini
- Successor: Giambattista Grossi
- Previous posts: Bishop of Chiusi (1538–1544); Apostolic Nuncio to Venice (1540–1542)

Personal details
- Born: 1467 Mantua, Italy
- Died: 22 January 1549 (age 82) Reggio Emilia, Italy

Giorgio Andreasi (1467–1549) was a Roman Catholic prelate who served as Bishop of Reggio Emilia (1544–1549), Apostolic Nuncio to Venice (1540–1542), and Bishop of Chiusi (1538–1544).

== Biography ==
Giorgio Andreasi was born in Mantua, Italy in 1467. He had an elder brother, Lodovico, who was born in 1462, and was a Consistorial Advocate in Rome under Pope Julius II; he died in 1506.

He began his career as secretary to Cardinal Francesco Sforza, the brother of the Duke of Milan. He was elected Archpriest of the cathedral Chapter of Milan.

Andreasi was a Protonotary Apostolic, and was the ambassador (orator) of the Duke of Milan to the Emperor Charles V, and then to Pope Clement VII, at least from 1529 to 1532.

On 20 March 1538, he was appointed by Pope Paul III to the diocese of Chiusi.

On 22 February 1540, he was appointed by Pope Paul III as Papal Legate in Venice; he was recalled on 18 April 1542.

He attended the Council of Trent.

On 2 April 1544, he was transferred by Paul III to the diocese of Reggio Emilia. In 1545 and again in 1548, assisted by his Vicars, Bishop Andreasi made official Visitations of the religious institutions in his diocese. Due to his advancing age, Bishop Andreasi was granted a Coadjutor on 14 December 1545, his own nephew Giovanni Battista Grossi. Grossi was not in major Holy Orders, and consequently his powers were limited.

He died on 22 January 1549 at the age of nearly eighty-two, and after a public viewing for two days, his remains were taken to Mantua for burial. He was originally interred in the Carmelite church in Mantua, with a monument by Prospero Clemente of Reggio, but when the Carmelites were suppressed in 1785, his monument was moved to the church of S. Andrea.

While bishop, he was the principal co-consecrator of Girolamo Foscari, Bishop of Torcello (1542).

== External links and additional sources ==
- Saccani, Giovanni (1902). I vescovi di Reggio-Emilia, Cronotassi, Reggio Emilia: Tip. Artigianelli 1902. (in Italian)
- Cheney, David M. "Nunciature to Venice". Catholic-Hierarchy.org. (for Chronology of Bishops) ^{[self-published]}

Catholic Church titles
Preceded by Gregorio Magalotti	Bishop of Chiusi; 1538–1544	Succeeded by Bartolomeo Guidiccioni
Preceded by Girolamo Verallo	Apostolic Nuncio to Venice; 1540–1542	Succeeded by Fabio Mignanelli
Preceded by Marcello Cervini	Bishop of Reggio Emilia; 1544–1549	Succeeded by Giambattista Grossi
