= Diocese of Tempio-Ampurias =

Latin Catholic diocese in Italy

Coordinates: 40.9000°N 9.1000°E

Diocese of Tempio-Ampurias Dioecesis Templensis-Ampuriensis

Catholic
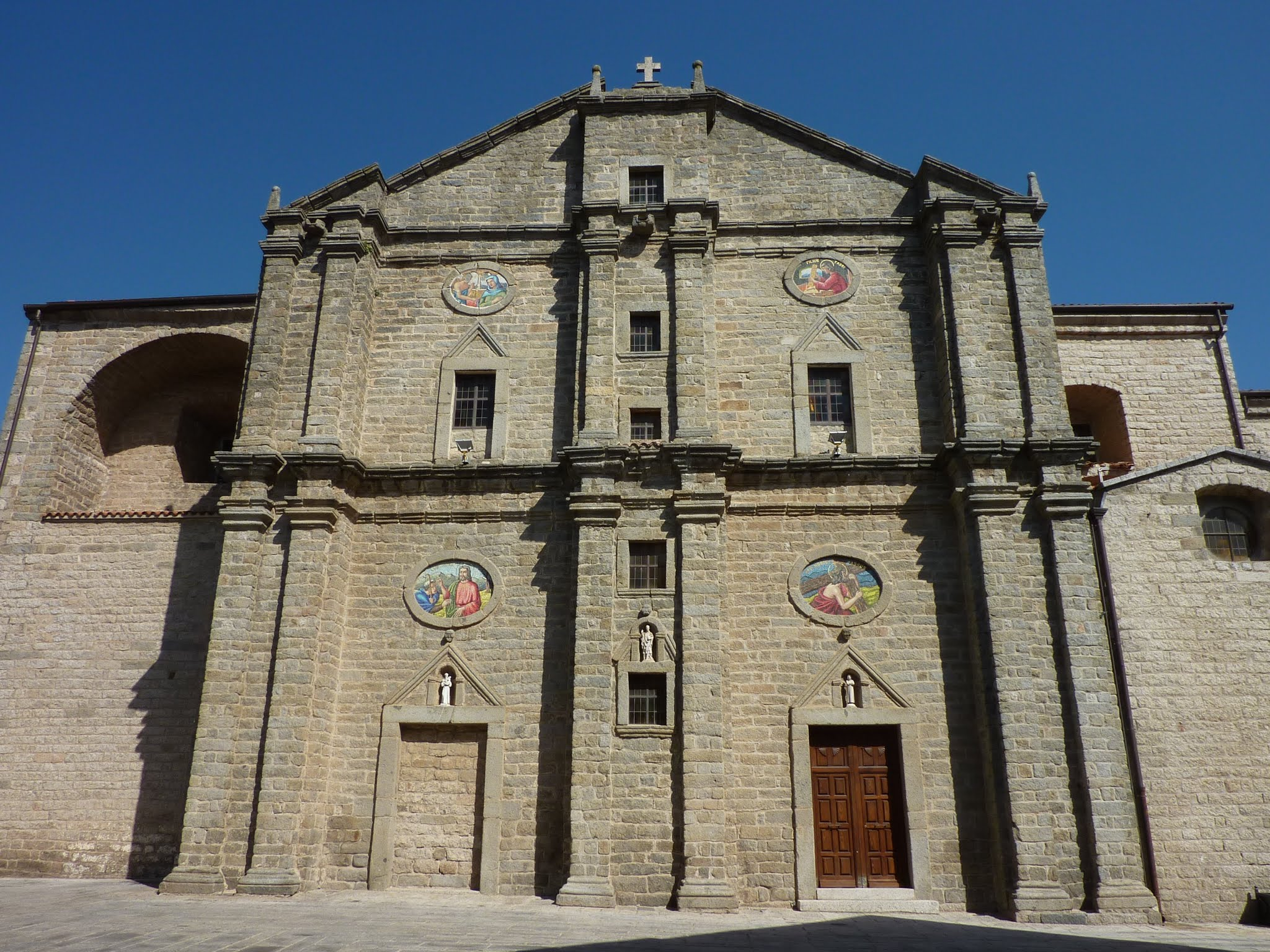
- Tempio, Cathedral of S. Pietro

Location
- Country: Italy
- Ecclesiastical province: Sassari

Statistics
- Area: 2,695 km^{2} (1,041 sq mi)
- Population: Total; Catholics: (as of 2023); 159,531 ▼; 156,800 (est.) ▼
- Parishes: 52 ▲

Information
- Denomination: Catholic Church
- Sui iuris church: Latin Church
- Rite: Roman Rite
- Established: 1506
- Cathedral: Cattedrale di S. Pietro Apostolo (Tempio)
- Co-cathedral: Concattedrale di S. Antonio Abate (Castelsardo)
- Secular priests: 66 (diocesan) ▼9 (religious Orders) ▼12 Permanent Deacons ▲

Current leadership
- Pope: Leo XIV
- Bishop: Roberto Fornaciari, O.S.B.
- Bishops emeritus: Sebastiano Sanguinetti

Website
- diocesitempioampurias.it

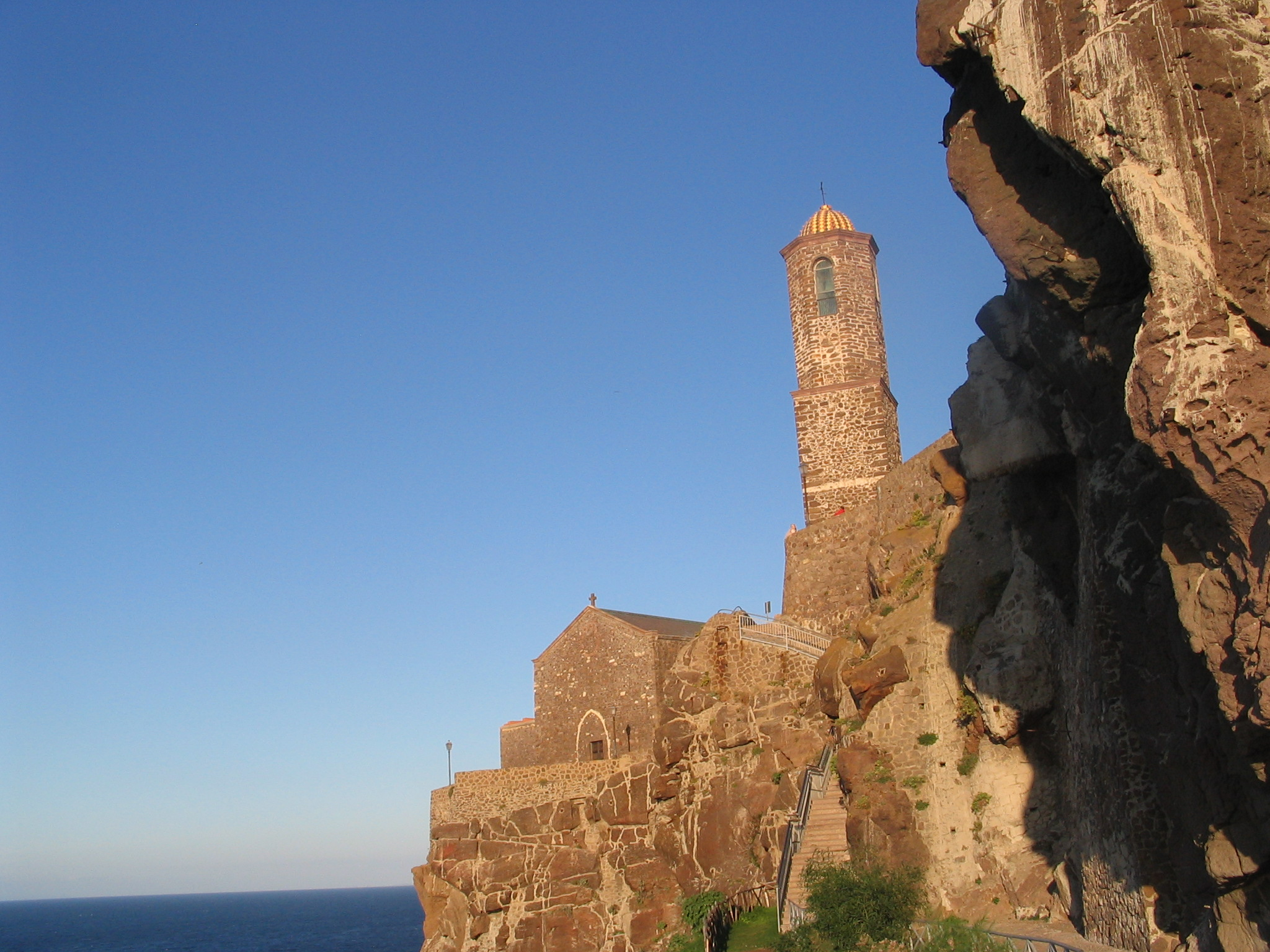
Co-cathedral in Ampurias

The Diocese of Tempio-Ampurias (Latin: Dioecesis Templensis-Ampuriensis) is a Latin Church diocese of the Catholic Church in Sardinia, Italy. It had borne the name of diocese of Ampurias until 1506, when it was combined with the diocese of Tempio. A single bishop was bishop of the two separate dioceses at the same time. Until 1986 it was known as Diocese of Ampurias e Tempio. On 30 September 1986, the two dioceses were united into one, and the name was changed to diocese of Tempio-Ampurias. The seat of the bishop is in Tempio. The diocese is a suffragan of the Archdiocese of Sassari

== History ==
The diocese of Ampurias was probably erected by the end of the 11th century, and made a suffragan of the archdiocese of Torres (Sassari). Bishop Cometa of Ampurias attended the Second Lateran Council of Pope Alexander III in March 1179.

The diocese of Cività, now Tempio, was allegedly founded in 304 by St. Simplicius. It was actually founded in the 12th century, and was a suffragan of the archbishop of Pisa. By the middle of the 13th century, however, it was directly dependent upon the Papacy.

In 1205, Bishop Petrus de Martis granted the Camaldolese monks the churches of S. Maria de Orrea Pichina and Saint Juste, exempting them from attending Chapter meetings or attending the chrism Mass of the bishops of Ampurias.

Inside the territory of the diocese of Ampurias, though not subject to the jurisdiction of the bishop of Ampurias, was the Benedictine monastery of Santa Maria di Tergo (or Cerigo). Its abbot exercised authority over all the other Benedictine monaasteries and hospitals in Sardinia, and had been designated, before 1295, Legatarius in Sardinia ven. patris domni Pontis abbatis montis cassinensis. In 1443, with no monks left in it, the monastery was handed over to the bishops of Ampurias.

Pope Boniface VIII invested the kings of Aragon with the title of "Rex Sardiniae et Corsicae" in 1297, though they did not establish their power until 1323. King Peter IV of Aragon finally drove the Genoese out of the island in 1354.

The seat of the diocese of Ampurias was transferred to the parish church at Castel-Genoves (Castelgenovese, later called Castellaragonese) by Pope Alexander VI. The church of San Antonio Abbate in Castelgenoese became the cathedral. It was served by a cathedral Chapter, consisting of one dignity (the Archpriest) and eight, later ten, canons.

=== Administrative unification ===
Pope Alexander VI had carried out a reorganization of the ecclesiastical provinces of Sassari and Cagliari in a bull of 12 April 1502. Ampurias continued to be a suffragan of Sassari. Its seat, however, was transferred to Castelgenovese, since the town of Ampurias had been gradually deserted.

After only five weeks in office, on 8 December 1503, Pope Julius II issued the bull "Aequum Reputamus," substantially reorganizing the structure of the churches in Sardinia. The preparatory work had obviously been carried out under Pope Alexander VI. Two problems had been emphasized: the shortage of money in episcopal income, and the decline of population. Ampurias figured in both categories.

The diocese of Cività, some fifty miles distant, was united to its neighbor the diocese of Ampurias aeque personaliter, by Pope Julius II on 5 June 1506, in the bull "Romanus Pontifex." One and the same bishop presided over each of the two dioceses. It was provided that the union would take place when one or the other of the bishops died or vacated his office. The survivor would have his seat at Castelgenovese. Bishop Pietro Stornello of Cività had died on 13 July 1505.

Despite the instructions in the papal bull "Romanus Pontifex", the bishop of Ampurias e Cività was still residing in Ampurias sixty years later. A letter sent to the bishop by a papal secretary, dated 29 January 1565, indicated that the pope, Pius IV, had received his request to transfer the diocesan seat to Castro Aragonese; but the pope also had information that the place was currently unsuitable as a place for a cathedral or a bishop's residence. The pope ordered that, until he had heard the reeasons why the bishop wanted to transfer to such a place, nothing should be done without first consulting the Holy See.

The cathedrals of both dioceses were in a dilapidated condition, and lacking in ecclesiastical ornaments necessary for divine worship.

Later the see was transferred to the church of Saint Simplicius in Civita (formerly called Olbia, and Terranova Pausania), now called Terranuova. Pope Gregory XVI suppressed the cathedral of Cività ed Ampurias in Terranova by the Bull "Quamvis aqua," signed on 26 August 1839, and raised the Collegiate Church of St. Peter, in Tempio, to cathedral status. Tempio and Ampurias were united, so that one bishop should govern both, aeque personaliter. The official title became "the bishop of Ampurias and of Tempio."

=== Synods ===
A diocesan synod was an irregularly held, but important, meeting of the bishop of a diocese and his clergy. Its purpose was (1) to proclaim generally the various decrees already issued by the bishop; (2) to discuss and ratify measures on which the bishop chose to consult with his clergy; (3) to publish statutes and decrees of the diocesan synod, of the provincial synod, and of the Holy See.

Bishop Nicolaus de Campo (1458–1479) participated in a provincial synod presided over by Archbishop Antonius of Torres (Sassari) on 26 October 1463.

Bishop Guilletus Esus (1448–1455?) held a diocesan synod.

On 8 May 1694, the Sacred Congregation of the Council in the Roman Curia issued a directive, instructing the bishop of Ampurias e Civita to hold his diocesan synods alternatively in the two dioceses, but not to require the clergy of Cività to attend synods of Ampurias. Bishop Michele Villa (1688–1700) held a synod of the diocese of Ampurias in the cathedral of San Antonio in Castelaragonese on 17–18 April 1695. On 21 November 1695, the Sacred Congregation of the Council in the Roman Curia issued a directive, ordering that the decrees of the synod of Ampurias of 1695 be published and that they be applicable to the diocese of Cività as well.

A diocesan synod of Ampurias was held in Castelsardo (formerly called Castelaragonese) in the church of Saint Anthony in May 1777 by Francesco Ignazio Guiso (1772–1778), Bishop of Ampurias e Cività; the statutes were published.

The see was vacant from 1854 to 1871.

=== Two dioceses become one ===
In 1986, following the norms established by the Second Vatican Council (1962–1965), Pope John Paul II, in the audience of 27 September 1986, approved a reorganization of the dioceses of Ampurias and Tempio. The Congregation of Bishops issued the decree "Instantibus Votis" on 30 September 1986. The practice of maintaining two separate dioceses governed by one and the same bishop was discontinued. There was to be one diocese, one bishop, and one cathedral. The new bishop was to be Pietro Meloni. The cathedral and the seat of the bishop was to be in Tempio Pausanìa, and the cathedral at Castelsardo was to become a "co-cathedral." The diocese was to be named "Dioecesis Templensis-Ampuriensis."

On 29 July 1993, Pope John Paul II, on the petition of Bishop Atzei, granted the parish church of Saint Simplicius in Olbia (diocese of Tempio-Ampurias) the title and privileges of a "minor basilica".

== Bishops of Ampurias ==
=== To 1458 ===
- Bonus (c. 1100)
- Nicolaus (c. 1112–1120)
- Gilitus (c. 1154)
- Comita de Martis (c. 1170–1179)
- Petrus de Martis (c. 1205)

...

- G[...] (1231)
- [ Ignotus ] (1252)
- Guglielmus (1255)
- Gunarius (c. 1283–1300)
- Bartholomaeus de Malague (1301–1332)
- Jacobus, O.P. (1332–)
- Audoinus (c. 1337)
- Bertrandus, O.P. (1355–1365)
- Petrus de S. Martino, O.Min. (1365– ?)
- Marcus (1386) Roman Obedience
- Nicolaus (1386–1395?) Roman Obedience
- Aegidius de Murello, O.Min. (1393– ?) Avignon Obedience
- Petrus Corsus (1395–1401) Roman Obedience
- Petrus Benedictus Ioannis (1401–1413)
- Tommaso di Bobbio (1413–1428)

=== From 1428 to 1493 ===
- Gavinus (1428–1443)
- Sisinius (1443–1448)
- Gonnarius Gadulese (1448–1449)
- Guilletus Esus (1448–1455?)
- Antonio de Alcala (1457)
- Nicolaus de Campo (1458–1479)
- Ludovico di Giovanni, O.F.M.Conv. (1480–1486)
- Didacus de Nava (1486–1493)

=== Bishops of Ampurias e Cività ===
==== from 1493 to 1700 ====
- Francesco Manno (1493–1511)
- Luis González, O.F.M. (1513–1538)
- Giorgio Artea (1538–1545 Died)
- Ludovico de Cotes, O.S.A. (1545–1557 Died)
- Francisco Tomás (1558–1572 Died)
- Pedro Narro, O.S.B. (1572–1574)
- Gaspar Vicente Novella (1575–1578)
- Miguel Rubio, O. Cist. (1579–1586 Died)
- Giovanni Sanna (1586–1607 Died)
- Felipe Marimón (1606–1613)
- Giacomo Passamar (1613–1622)
- Giovanni de La Bronda (1622–1633)
- Andrea Manca (1633–1644)
- Gavino Manca Figo (1644–1652)
- Gaspare Litago (1652–1656)
- Lorenzo Sampero (1656–1669)
- Pedro de Alagón y de Cardona (1669–1672)
- José Sanchís y Ferrandis, O. de M. (1672–1673)
- Juan Bautista Sorribas, O. Carm. (1673–1678 Died)
- Giuseppe Acorrà (1679–1685)
- Francesco Sampero (1685–1688 Died)
- Michele Villa (1688–1700 Died)

==== From 1700 to 1839 ====
- Diego Serafino Posulo, O.P. (1702–1718)
- Angelo Galzerin, O.F.M. Conv. (1727– 1735 Died)
- Giovanni Leonardo Sanna (1736– 1737)
- Vincenzo Giovanni Vico Torrellas (1737–1741)
- Salvator Angelo Cadello (1741–1764)
- Pietro Paolo Carta (1764–1771 Died)
- Francesco Ignazio Guiso (1772–1778)
- Giovanni Antonio Arras Minutili (1779– 1784)
- Michele Pes (1785–1804)
- Giuseppe Stanislao Paradiso (1807–1819)
- Stanislao Mossa (1823 – death 1827.04.09)
- Stanislao Mossa (1823–1825)
- Diego Capece (1833–1855)

=== Bishops of Ampurias e Tempio ===
- Diego Capece (1839–1855)

Sede vacante (1854–1871)

- Filippo Campus Chessa (1871–1887)
- Paolo Pinna (1887–1892)
- Antonio Maria Contini (1893–1907 Resigned)

Sede Vacante (1907-1914)

- Giovanni Maria Sanna, O.F.M. Conv. (1914–1922)
- Albino Morera (1922–1950 Retired)
- Carlo Re, I.M.C. (1951–1961 Resigned)
- Mario Ghiga (1961–1963)
- Giovanni Melis Fois (1963–1970)
- Carlo Urru (1971–1982)
- Pietro Meloni (1983–1992)

=== Bishops of Tempio-Ampurias ===
- Paolo Mario Virgilio Atzei, O.F.M. Conv. (1993–2004)
- Sebastiano Sanguinetti (2006–2023)
- Roberto Fornaciari (2023–)

== See also ==
- Diocese of Civita

== Bibliography ==
=== Reference Works ===
- Eubel, Conradus, ed. (1913). Hierarchia catholica (in Latin). Vol. 1 (Tomus 1) (second ed.). Münster: Libreria Regensbergiana. p. 86.. Archived.
- Eubel, Conradus, ed. (1914). Hierarchia catholica (in Latin). Vol. 2 (Tomus 2) (second ed.). Münster: Libreria Regensbergiana. pp. 86–87.. Archived.
- Eubel, Conradus, ed. (1923). Hierarchia catholica (in Latin). Vol. 3 (Tomus 3) (second ed.). Münster: Libreria Regensbergiana. p. 107.. Archived.
- Gams, Pius Bonifatius (1873). Series episcoporum Ecclesiae catholicae: quotquot innotuerunt a beato Petro apostolo. Ratisbon: Typis et Sumptibus Georgii Josephi Manz. pp. 834–835. (Use with caution; obsolete)
- Gauchat, Patritius (Patrice) (1935). Hierarchia catholica (in Latin). Vol. IV (1592-1667). Münster: Libraria Regensbergiana. p. 87.
- Ritzler, Remigius; Sefrin, Pirminus (1952). Hierarchia catholica medii et recentis aevi (in Latin). Vol. V (1667-1730). Patavii: Messagero di S. Antonio.
- Ritzler, Remigius; Sefrin, Pirminus (1958). Hierarchia catholica medii et recentis aevi (in Latin). Vol. 6 (1730-1799). Patavii: Messagero di S. Antonio.
- Ritzler, Remigius; Sefrin, Pirminus (1968). Hierarchia Catholica medii et recentioris aevi (in Latin). Vol. 7 (1800–1846). Monasterii: Libr. Regensburgiana.
- Ritzler, Remigius; Sefrin, Pirminus (1978). Hierarchia catholica Medii et recentioris aevi (in Latin). Vol. 8 (1846–1903). Il Messaggero di S. Antonio.
- Pięta, Zenon (2002). Hierarchia catholica medii et recentioris aevi (in Latin). Vol. 9 (1903–1922). Padua: Messagero di San Antonio. ISBN 978-88-250-1000-8.

=== Studies ===
- Bima, Palemona Luigi (1845). Serie cronologica degli arcivescovi e vescovi del regno di Sardegna. (in Italian). Asti: Raspi & Riba 1845. (pp. 75-81)
- Cappelletti, Giuseppe (1857). Le chiese d'Italia dalla loro origine sino ai nostri giorni (in Italian). Vol. decimoterzo (13). Venezia: Antonelli. pp. 155–171..
- Fara, Giovanni Francesco (1835). De chorographia Sardiniae: libri duo de rebus Sardois libri quatuor edente Aloisio Cibrario. (in Latin). Turin: Typographia Regia, 1835.
- Gams, Pius Bonifatius (1873). Series episcoporum Ecclesiae catholicae: quotquot innotuerunt a beato Petro apostolo (in Latin). Ratisbon: Typis et Sumptibus Georgii Josephi Manz. pp. 832–833.
- Kehr, Paul Fridolin. Italia Pontificia (in Latin), Vol. X: Calabria – Insulae (Turici: Weidmann 1975). (pp. 422–423; 436-437)
- Lanzoni, Francesco (1927). Le diocesi d'Italia dalle origini al principio del secolo VII (an. 604) (in Italian). Rome: Biblioteca Apostolica Vaticana. pp. 678-679.
- Martini, Pietro (1841). Storia ecclesiastica di Sardegna. Volume 3 Cagliari: Stamperia Reale, 1841. (pp. 346-352).
- Mattei, Antonio Felice (1758). Sardinia sacra seu De episcopis Sardis historia nunc primò confecta a F. Antonio Felice Matthaejo. (in Latin). Romae: ex typographia Joannis Zempel apud Montem Jordanum, 1758. Pp. 180-191.
- Pintus, Sebastiano (1908). "Vescovi di Fausania, Civita, Ampurias, Ampurias e Civita, oggidì di Ampurias e Tempio," (in Italian), in: Archivio storico sardo Vol. 4 (Cagliari 1908), pp. 97–115.
