= Poyet =

Poyet is a surname. Notable people with the surname include:

- Diego Poyet (born 1995), Uruguayan footballer, son of Gus Poyet
- Gus Poyet (born 1967), Uruguayan football manager and former player
- Guillaume Poyet (c. 1473–1548), French magistrate
- Romain Poyet (born 1980), French footballer
