= Santo Bartolomeo Quadri =

- Bishop of Diocese of Modena-Nonantola
- Church: Roman Catholic Church
- See: Diocese of Modena-Nonantola
- In office: 1983–1996
- Predecessor: Bruno Foresti
- Successor: Benito Cocchi
- Previous post(s): Terni-Narni Diocese; Bishop

Orders
- Ordination: March 6, 1943

Personal details
- Born: December 2, 1919; Ossanesga, Italy
- Died: October 17, 2008 (aged 88); Modena, Italy

Santo Bartolomeo Quadri (December 2, 1919 – October 17, 2008) was an Italian Prelate of Roman Catholic Church.

== Biography ==
Quadri was born in Ossanesga, Italy and was ordained a priest on March 6, 1943. He was appointed Auxiliary bishop of the Pinerolo Diocese as well as Titular bishop of Villa Nova on March 17, 1964. Quadri was ordained bishop May 7, 1964. On February 10, 1973 he was appointed bishop of the Terni-Narni Diocese and he held this position until his appointment to the Diocese of Modena-Nonantola. He was appointed to the Archdiocese of Modena-Nonantola on May 31, 1983 until his retirement on April 12, 1996.

== See also ==
- Diocese of Pinerolo
- Roman Catholic Archdiocese of Modena-Nonantola
- Roman Catholic Diocese of Terni-Narni-Amelia
