= Rapolla Cathedral =

Cathedral in Rapolla, Basilicata, Italy

Coordinates: 40.9775°N 15.6769°E

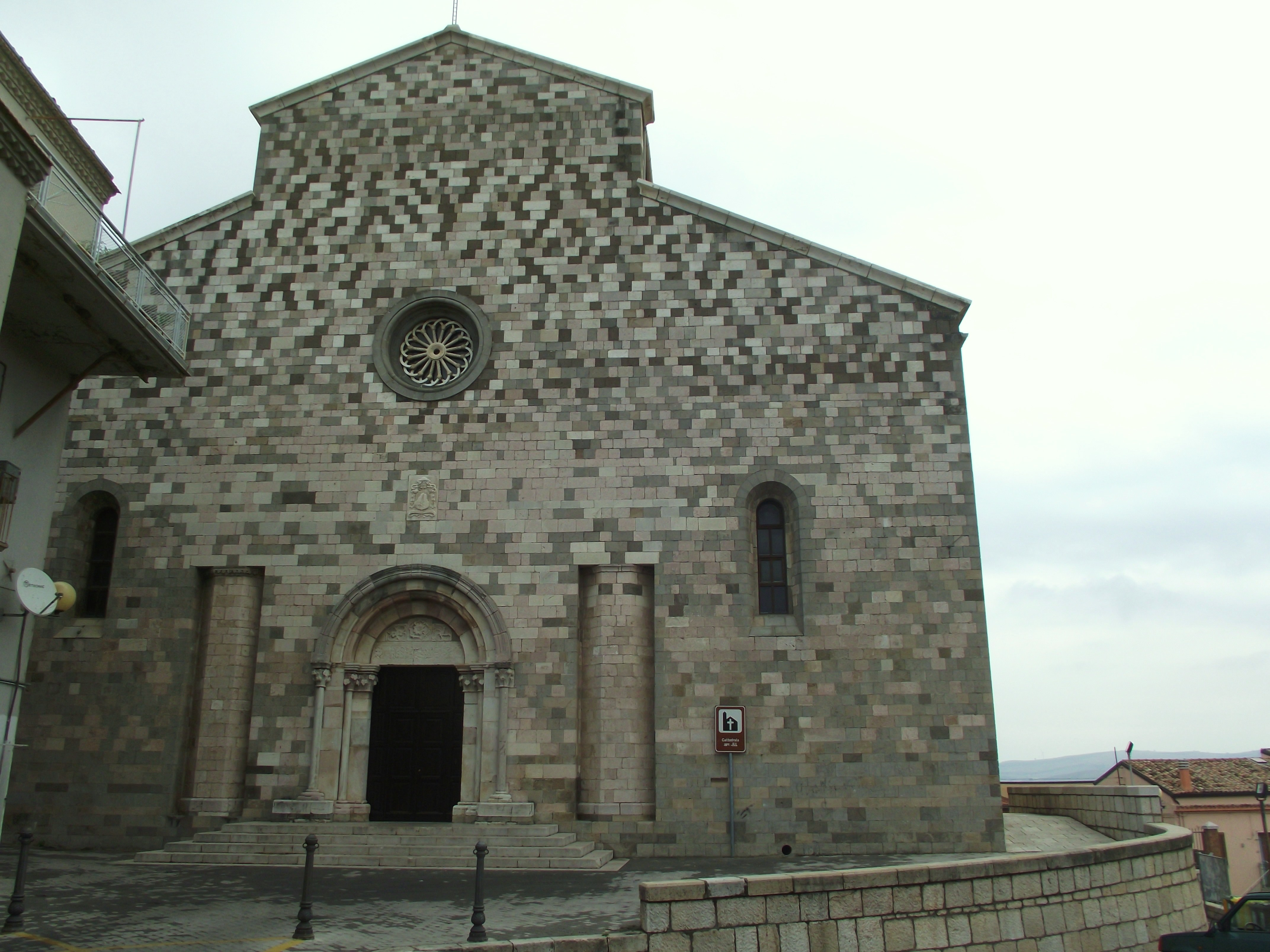
West front of the cathedral

Rapolla Cathedral (Italian: Duomo di Rapolla; Concattedrale di San Michele Arcangelo) is a Roman Catholic cathedral in the town of Rapolla, province of Potenza, region of Basilicata, Italy. The dedication is to Saint Michael the Archangel. Formerly the episcopal seat of the Diocese of Rapolla, it is now a co-cathedral in the Diocese of Melfi-Rapolla-Venosa.

== History and description ==
The structure was erected in a Romanesque style in 1209 on the site of a paleochristian building, possibly occupying the site of a pagan temple. The belltower was designed by Sarolo di Muro Lucano. Rebuilt a few decades later in 1253, by Melchiorre da Montalbano, it has survived in this earthquake-prone region. The interior with three naves, separated by columns and arches, houses a 16th-century crucifix with bas-reliefs depicting Adam and Eve and the Annunciation by Sarolo da Muro Lucano. The apse also has a 13th-century carved polychrome wooden crucifix.
