= Antonio Giustiniani =

Antonio Giustiniani May refer to:

- Antonio Giustiniani (archbishop of Lipari) (died 1571), Greek Catholic prelate who served as Archbishop of Lipari (1564–1571) and Archbishop of Naxos (1562–1564)
- Antonio Giustiniani (archbishop of Naxos) (1663–1730), Greek Catholic prelate who served as Archbishop of Naxos (1701–1730)
