= Domenico Lentini =

Italian Roman Catholic priest

Blessed Domenico Lentini
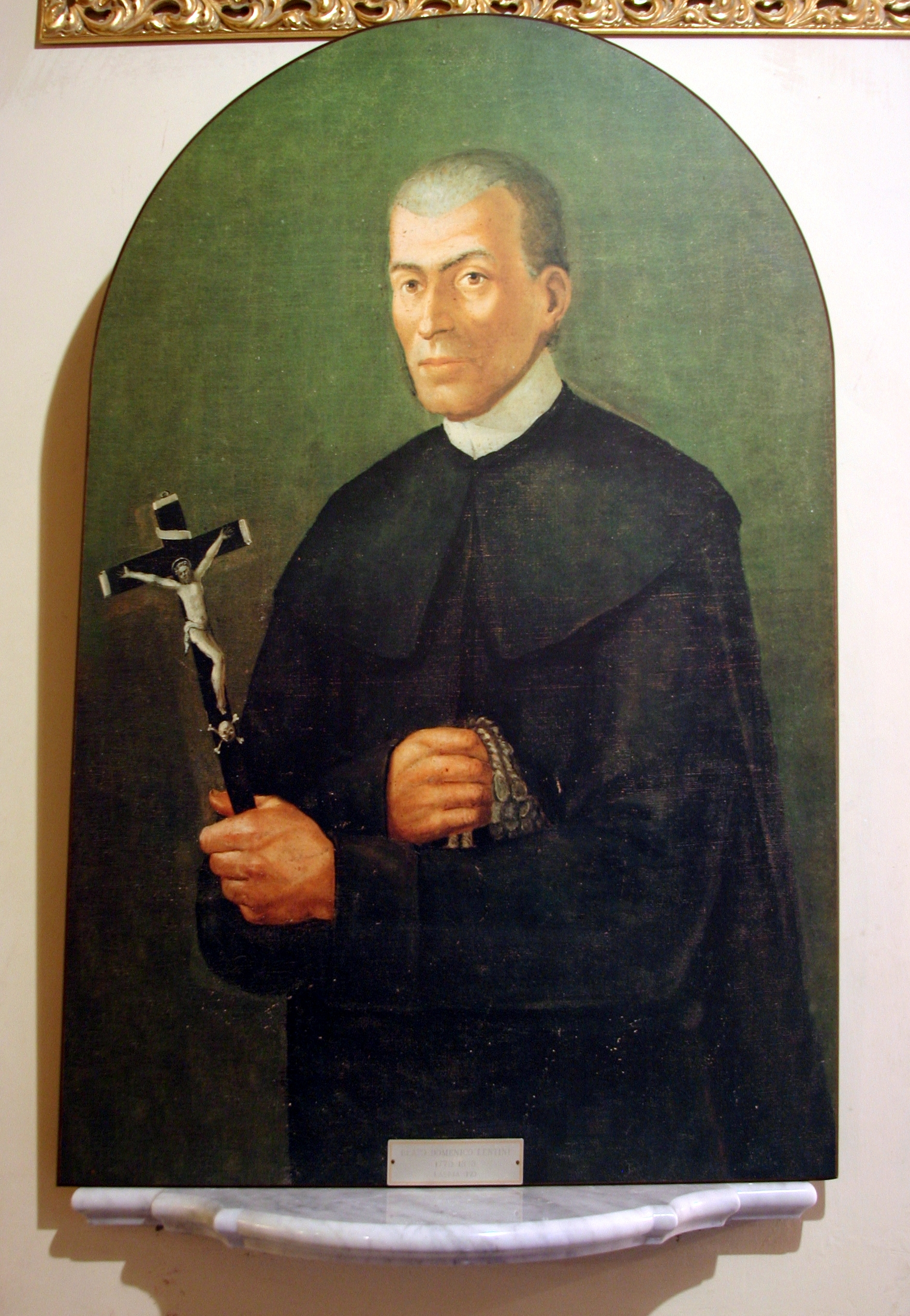

Priest
- Born: 20 November 1770; Lauria, Potenza, Kingdom of Naples
- Died: 25 February 1828 (aged 57); Lauria, Potenza, Kingdom of the Two Sicilies
- Venerated in: Roman Catholic Church
- Beatified: 12 October 1997, Saint Peter's Square, Vatican City by Pope John Paul II
- Feast: 25 February
- Attributes: Crucifix; Book of Hours; Priest's attire
- Patronage: Lauria; Diocese of Tursi-Lagonegro

Domenico Lentini (20 November 1770 – 25 February 1828) was an Italian Roman Catholic priest. He was ordained in 1794 and was a life-long parish priest in his hometown of Potenza where he promoted Eucharistic devotion and worked alongside the poor of the area. He also fostered education and evangelization and often taught parishioners catechism and literature while making himself available to hear the confessions of penitents.

The beatification process for Lentini opened in 1905 and he became titled Venerable in 1935. Pope John Paul II beatified Lentini on 12 October 1997.

== Life ==
Domenico Lentini was born on 20 November 1770 in Lauria as the last of five children to Macario Lentini (a shoemaker; died 1796) and Rosalia Vitarella of poor economic conditions. The Lentinis were of Sicilian origins and first appeared in the documents of notaries around 1500. He was baptized mere hours after his birth. His siblings (in order) were:

- Dominique
- Rosa
- Nicholas
- Antoinette (died 28 August 1830)

His first two sisters Dominique and Rosa married as he did his brother Nicholas who would relocate to Fardella. His maternal uncle was the priest Domenico Vitarella. His sister Antoinette served as Lentini's housekeeper after he became a priest. In his childhood, he was vivacious and often ran to trees looking for birds. Lentini received his Confirmation on 16 June 1772.

In 1785 he felt a call to become a priest and he commenced his ecclesial studies alongside Giuseppe Ielpo who entered just a few months prior to him. Ielpo would later become Lentini's confessor. He began his studies in Policastro (at Salerno) from 1785 to 1787 and had to transfer his studies to Lauria due to his poor economic condition. But his father expressed his happiness at his son's vocation and was present when his son was made a priest.

Lentini received his ordination into the diaconate on 27 October 1793 in Mormanno from the Bishop of Cassano all'Jonio Giovanni Battista Coppola. Lentini received his solemn ordination to the priesthood at Pentecost on 8 June 1794 in the Marsico Nuovo Cathedral from Bishop Bernardo Maria Latorre (since Policastro had no bishop at the time); he was then assigned to work as a parish priest in his hometown. He was devoted to the Eucharist and gained a reputation as a noted homilist as well as for his extensive pastoral work with the poor. He turned his home into a school where he taught theological studies and catechism to parishioners as well as other subjects such as literature. He taught such subjects to people with no need for compensation. His devotion to the Eucharist also led him to promote this among his parishioners in order to foster greater devotion to it.

Lentini often subjected himself to penitential practices and he sometimes deprived himself of nourishment in the spirit of living in total and constant penance with the corporal mortification of the flesh and sleeping of the floor. He did this for the atonement of sins and in the imitation of Jesus Christ. He was also known for his frugal manner of living and sacrificed the various trappings of the priesthood to express his desire to live like the poor. Lentini was further referred to as the "Precursor to the Curé d'Ars" after his death due to his willingness to make himself available to hear the confessions of penitents. His long hours before the Eucharist in adoration - added with his intensive contemplation - led his contemporaries to call him "an angel at the altar" since it was believed he experienced ecstasies before the Blessed Sacrament. He was also noted for being able to convert the hearts of sinners whom he met.

In February 1828 he was before the Eucharist when he suffered a sudden and severe pain that forced him to his bed. His friend Giuseppe Ielpo granted him the Extreme Unction on 22 February 1828. He died on 25 February 1828 in his home in the evening around 8:30pm with a reputation for saintliness. He died with a crucifix in hand and a lighted candle at his side. His funeral was held for a full week in which his remains emitted a sweet scent noted to be the odor of saintliness. His remains were said to have also been warm and flexible. There is a parish in Catanzaro that was named in his honor.

== Beatification ==
The cause of canonization commenced on a local diocesan level from 1842 to 1844 and again from 1890 to 1893. The formal cause started on 12 April 1905 under Pope Pius X; this titled Lentini as a Servant of God. Theologians confirmed his writings were in line with doctrine on 8 June 1896. The cause continued in Rome in an apostolic process spanning from 1905 to 1921. The Congregation for Rites validated these processes on 23 July 1926. Members of an antepreparatory committee approved the cause on 28 October 1930 as did a preparatory one on 26 June 1931 and a general committee on 15 January 1935. It was Pope Pius XI who declared that Lentini lived a life of heroic virtue which bestowed upon him the title of Venerable on 27 January 1935.

His beatification depended on papal confirmation of a miracle attributed to him. One such case was investigated and then taken to the Congregation for the Causes of Saints for assessment; the C.C.S. validated the investigation on 15 January 1993. Medical experts approved the miracle on 18 May 1995 as did the theologians on 13 October 1995 and the C.C.S. members on 4 June 1996. Pope John Paul II approved a miracle attributed to him on 17 December 1996 and presided over Lentini's beatification on 12 October 1997.

The canonization all depends on papal confirmation of one more miracle; one such case is under investigation and the process of investigation received C.C.S. validation on 5 November 2010. The medical board stationed in Rome approved this healing as a miracle on 9 October 2014.
