= Bottoni =

Bottoni is a surname. Notable people with the surname include:

- Alessandro Bottoni (born 1972), Italian triathlete
- Christoph Bottoni (born 1977), Swiss sailor
- Flaminio Bottoni (1881–?), Italian gymnast
- Marco Antonio Bottoni, Italian Roman Catholic prelate
