= San Gianuario, Marsico Nuovo =

Church building in Marsico Nuovo, Italy

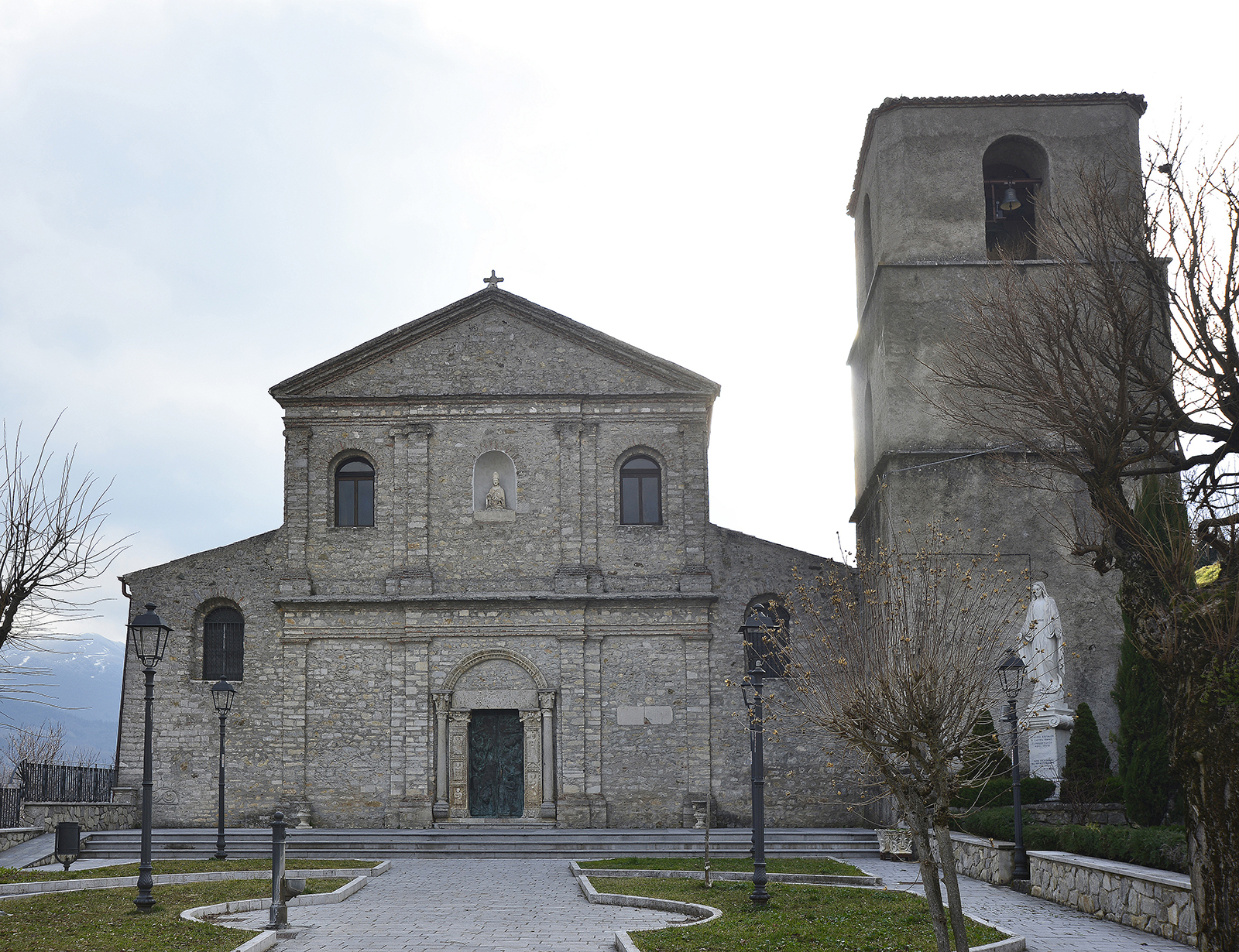

San Gianuario is a Roman Catholic church located on Largo San Gianuario, in front of the church of San Michele Arcangelo, in the town of Marsico Nuovo, province of Potenza, region of Basilicata, Italy. It is cited as the co-cathedral of the town along with the church of San Giorgio.

== History ==
The church is thought to have been erected at the site of a pagan Serapeum, and that some of the capitals of the columns are spolia from such a temple. The site had a pre-Christian cemetery. Documents maintain the Abbey of Santo Stefano was erected here under the patronage of a Count Osmondo during the rule of the Norman Robert Guiscard in the region. The abbey putatively held the relics of San Gianuario, a 4th-century bishop martyred nearby by Diocletian. The abbey however fell into disuse and ruin, leaving behind only this church. The structure has been refurbished over the centuries.

The church houses a number of artworks including a detached fresco derived from the church of San Francesco. The church has paintings by Simonelli, Feliciano Mangieri and Nicola Peccheneda. A stone portal, attributed to Melchiorre da Montalbano, consists of flanking column-pilasters with bas-reliefs of bishops. In a niche above the portal is a half-figure bust of San Stefano. The bronze doors (1699) are by Antonio Masini.

Every August 23, a dressed icon of the patron of the town is carried in procession to the church.
