= Juan González de Mendoza =

Spanish bishop, explorer, sinologist and writer

Most Reverend Juan González de Mendoza
- Bishop of Popayán
- Church: Catholic Church
- Diocese: Diocese of Popayán
- In office: 1608–1618
- Predecessor: Juan de La Roca
- Successor: Ambrosio Vallejo Mejía
- Previous posts: Bishop of Lipari (1593–1599); Bishop of Chiapas (1607–1608)

Orders
- Consecration: 7 June 1593 by Filippo Spinola

Personal details
- Born: 1545 Torrecilla en Cameros (La Rioja)
- Died: 14 February 1618 (aged 72–73) Popayán, Colombia
- Occupation: Bishop, explorer, sinologist, writer

Juan González de Mendoza, O.S.A. (1545 – 14 February 1618) was a Spanish bishop, explorer, sinologist, and writer. He was the author of one of the earliest Western histories of China. Published by him in 1585, Historia de las cosas más notables, ritos y costumbres del gran reyno de la China (The History of the Great and Mighty Kingdom of China and the Situation Thereof) is an account of observations of several Spanish travelers in China. An English translation by Robert Parke appeared in 1588 and was reprinted by the Hakluyt Society in two volumes, edited by Sir George T. Staunton, Bart. (London, 1853–54).

González de Mendoza's Historia was mostly superseded in 1615 by the work of much more informed Jesuit missionaries who actually lived in China, Matteo Ricci and Nicolas Trigault, De Christiana expeditione apud Sinas. Much of González de Mendoza's work was plagiarised from Escalante's Discurso de la navegacion.

== Biography ==
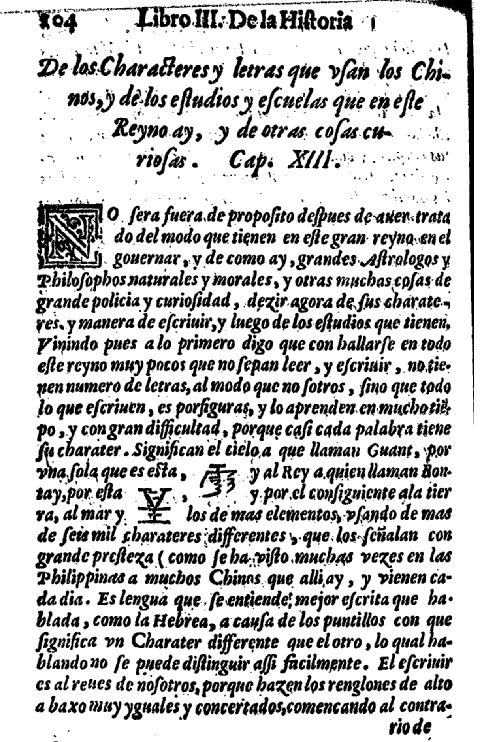
First page of the chapter on Chinese language in González de Mendoza's 1585 book, reproducing the characters published by Escalante in 1577. According to Staunton, of the two characters shown on this page, the first (said to mean "heaven") is hard to identify, although he guesses that it might be 𨺩 (a variant of 乾). Modern Chinese translators of González de Mendoza's books suggest that 穹 may have been meant. (May it though be a combination of two characters, with the one on top being a 天, perhaps in seal script?). The second (said to mean "king") is a poorly written 皇.

González de Mendoza was born at Torrecilla en Cameros (La Rioja) in 1545. He joined the army but after some years resigned to enter the Order of Saint Augustine. He published his most famous text in 1585, Historia de las cosas más notables, ritos y costumbres del gran reyno de la China. It was based on the journals of Miguel de Luarca, whose 1580 trip to Ming China provided a simple majority thereof. He never set foot in China, but spent two years in Mexico before returning to Spain.

On 31 May 1593, he was appointed during the papacy of Pope Clement VIII as Bishop of Lipari. On 7 June 1593, he was consecrated bishop by Filippo Spinola, Cardinal-Priest of Santa Sabina, with Cristóbal Senmanat y Robuster, Bishop of Orihuela, and Lorenzo Celsi, Bishop of Castro del Lazio, serving as co-consecrators.

On 24 May 1599, he resigned as Bishop of Lipari. On 7 May 1607, he was appointed during the papacy of Pope Paul V as Bishop of Chiapas. On 17 November 1608, he was appointed during the papacy of Pope Paul V as Bishop of Popayán. He served as Bishop of Popayán until his death on 14 February 1618.

== Episcopal succession ==
While bishop, he was the principal co-consecrator of:

- Pedro Castro Nero, Bishop of Lugo (1599);
- Juan Ramírez de Arellano (bishop), Bishop of Santiago de Guatemala (1600); and
- Juan Pérez de Espinosa, Bishop of Santiago de Chile (1600).

== Bibliography ==
- Historia de las cosas más notables, ritos y costumbres del gran reyno de la China (original Spanish; Rome, 1585)
- The history of the great and mighty kingdom of China and the situation thereof (English translation by Robert Parke, 1588)
  - an 1853 reprint by Hakluyt Society: Mendoza, Juan González de (1853) [1588]. Staunton, George Thomas (ed.). The History of the Great and Mighty Kingdom of China and the Situation Thereof. Vol. 1, 2. Translated by Parke, Robert. Hakluyt Society.; vol. 1 at archive.org vol. 2 at archive.org; vol. 1 at Project Gutenberg; vol. 2 at Project Gutenberg
    - reprint: Mendoza, Juan González de (1970) [1853]. Staunton, George Thomas (ed.). The History of the Great and Mighty Kingdom of China and the Situation Thereof. Vol. 1. Translated by Parke, Robert (reprint ed.). B. Franklin. ISBN 0833723618.
    - reprint: Mendoza, Juan González de (1970) [1854]. Staunton, George Thomas (ed.). The History of the Great and Mighty Kingdom of China and the Situation Thereof. Vol. 2. Translated by Parke, Robert (reprint ed.). B. Franklin. ISBN 0833723626.
- Links to many other translations: "Historia de las cosas más notables, ritos y costumbres del gran reyno de la China". Biblotheca Sinica 2.0 in Universitaet Wien. 2010-01-17.

== See also ==
- Martín Ignacio de Loyola

Catholic Church titles
Preceded by Martín Acuña	Bishop of Lipari; 1593–1599	Succeeded by Alfonso Vidal
Preceded by Lucas Duran	Bishop of Chiapas; 1607–1608	Succeeded by Juan Tomás de Blanes
Preceded by Juan de La Roca	Bishop of Popayán; 1608–1618	Succeeded by Ambrosio Vallejo Mejía
