= Gregorio Magalotti =

Italian Catholic bishop

Most Reverend Gregorio Magalotti
- Bishop of Chiusi
- Church: Catholic Church
- Diocese: Diocese of Chiusi
- In office: 1534–1537
- Predecessor: Bartolomeo Ferratini
- Successor: Giorgio Andreasi
- Previous post: Bishop of Lipari (1532–1534)

Personal details
- Died: September 1537 Chiusi, Italy

Gregorio Magalotti (died 1537) was a Roman Catholic prelate who served as Bishop of Chiusi (1534–1537) and Bishop of Lipari (1532–1534).

== Biography ==
On 23 August 1532, Gregorio Magalotti was appointed Bishop of Lipari by Pope Clement VII.

He served as Governor of the City of Rome from 1 April 1532 to 14 September 1534. While he was governor, he wrote a treatise on the difficult subject of safe-conducts and ambassadorial immunities. It was published after his death, and was endorsed by Pope Sixtus V (1585–1590).

On 20 August 1534, he was appointed Bishop of Chiusi by Pope Clement VII. He enjoyed the prerogatives of Bishop of Chiusi until his death in September 1537, though the popes employed him elsewhere.

== External links and additional sources ==
- Cheney, David M. "Diocese of Lipari". Catholic-Hierarchy.org. (for Chronology of Bishops) ^{[self-published]}
- Chow, Gabriel. "Diocese of Lipari (Italy)". GCatholic.org. (for Chronology of Bishops) ^{[self-published]}
- Cheney, David M. "Diocese of Chiusi e Pienza". Catholic-Hierarchy.org. (for Chronology of Bishops) ^{[self-published]}
- Chow, Gabriel. "Diocese of Chiusi (Italy)". GCatholic.org. (for Chronology of Bishops) ^{[self-published]}

Catholic Church titles
Preceded by Antonio Zeno	Bishop of Lipari; 1532–1534	Succeeded by Baldo Ferratini
Preceded by Bartolomeo Ferratini	Bishop of Chiusi; 1534–1537	Succeeded by Giorgio Andreasi
