= Filippo Lancia =

Roman Catholic prelate

Most Reverend Filippo Lancia
- Bishop of Lipari
- Church: Catholic Church
- In office: 1554–1564
- Predecessor: Baldo Ferratini
- Successor: Antonio Giustiniani

Personal details
- Died: 1564 Lipari, Italy

Filippo Lancia (died 1564) was a Roman Catholic prelate who served as Bishop of Lipari (1554–1564).

== Biography ==
On 13 April 1554, Filippo Lancia was appointed during the papacy of Pope Julius III as Bishop of Lipari. He served as Bishop of Lipari until his death in 1564.

== External links and additional sources ==
- Cheney, David M. "Diocese of Lipari". Catholic-Hierarchy.org. (for Chronology of Bishops) ^{[self-published]}
- Chow, Gabriel. "Diocese of Lipari (Italy)". GCatholic.org. (for Chronology of Bishops) ^{[self-published]}

Catholic Church titles
Preceded by Baldo Ferratini	Bishop of Lipari; 1554–1564	Succeeded by Antonio Giustiniani
