= Benedetto Geraci =

1xth-century Roman Catholic bishop

Most Reverend Benedetto Geraci
- Bishop of Lipari
- Church: Catholic Church
- In office: 1650–1660
- Predecessor: Agostino Candido
- Successor: Adamo Gentile

Orders
- Consecration: 8 Jan 1651 by Francesco Peretti di Montalto

Personal details
- Born: 1590 Gerace, Italy
- Died: 18 Aug 1660 (age 70)

Benedetto Geraci (1590–1660) was a Roman Catholic prelate who served as Bishop of Lipari (1650–1660).

== Biography ==
Benedetto Geraci was born in 1590 in Gerace, Italy. On 19 Dec 1650, he was appointed during the papacy of Pope Innocent X as Bishop of Lipari. On 8 Jan 1651, he was consecrated bishop by Francesco Peretti di Montalto, Archbishop of Monreale, with Ranuccio Scotti Douglas, Bishop Emeritus of Borgo San Donnino, and Francesco Biglia, Bishop of Pavia, serving as co-consecrators. He served as Bishop of Lipari until his death on 18 Aug 1660.

== External links and additional sources ==
- Cheney, David M. "Diocese of Lipari". Catholic-Hierarchy.org. (for Chronology of Bishops) ^{[self-published]}
- Chow, Gabriel. "Diocese of Lipari (Italy)". GCatholic.org. (for Chronology of Bishops) ^{[self-published]}

Catholic Church titles
Preceded by Agostino Candido	Bishop of Lipari; 1650–1660	Succeeded by Adamo Gentile
