= Antonio Zeno (bishop) =

Italian Roman Catholic prelate

Most Reverend Antonio Zeno
- Bishop of Lipari
- Church: Catholic Church
- In office: 1515–1530
- Predecessor: Luigi de Amato
- Successor: Gregorio Magalotti

Personal details
- Died: 1530 Lipari, Italy

Antonio Zeno (died 1530) was a Roman Catholic prelate who served as Bishop of Lipari (1515–1530).

== Biography ==
On 26 January 1515, Antonio Zeno was appointed during the papacy of Pope Leo X as Bishop of Lipari. He served as Bishop of Lipari until his death in 1530.

== External links and additional sources ==
- Cheney, David M. "Diocese of Lipari". Catholic-Hierarchy.org. (for Chronology of Bishops) ^{[self-published]}
- Chow, Gabriel. "Diocese of Lipari (Italy)". GCatholic.org. (for Chronology of Bishops) ^{[self-published]}

Catholic Church titles
Preceded by Luigi de Amato	Bishop of Lipari; 1515–1530	Succeeded by Gregorio Magalotti
