= Melchiorre da Montalbano =

Italian sculptor

Melchiorre da Montalbano was an Italian architect and sculptor, active in the 13th century in the region of Basilicata.

Details of his life are few. He is said to have been born in Montalbano, and worked under or with Bartolomeo da Foggia. He was one of the major sculptors in the region at that time, along with Mele da Stigliano and Sàrolo da Muro. He operated at a time of change from Romanesque to Gothic styles, and reflected the latter style.

Among his works in Basilicata are:

- Relief tiles of Pronaos, Anglona Cathedral
- Column capitals palazzo comunale, Atella
- Portal, Santa Maria del Piano, Calvello
- Portal and Architrave, San Gianuario, Marsico Nuovo
- Portal, San Michele Arcangelo, Marsico Nuovo
- Relief tiles depicting Abraham, Matera Cathedral
- Portal and pilasters, Rapolla Cathedral
- Portalino, San Pietro, Tolve
