= Paolo Bellardito =

Italian Roman Catholic prelate

Most Reverend Paolo Bellardito
- Bishop of Lipari
- Church: Catholic Church
- In office: 1580–1585
- Predecessor: Pietro Cancellieri
- Successor: Martín Acuña

Orders
- Consecration: 28 Oct 1580 by Giovanni Antonio Facchinetti de Nuce

Paolo Bellardito was a Roman Catholic prelate who served as Bishop of Lipari (1580–1585).

== Biography ==
On 17 October 1580, Paolo Bellardito was appointed during the papacy of Pope Gregory XIII as Bishop of Lipari. On 28 Oct 1580, he was consecrated bishop by Giovanni Antonio Facchinetti de Nuce, Titular Patriarch of Jerusalem with Bartolomeo Ferratini (iuniore), Bishop Emeritus of Amelia, and Giovanni Battista Soriani, Bishop of Bisceglie, serving as co-consecrators.

He served as Bishop of Lipari until his resignation in 1585.

== See also ==
- Catholic Church in Italy

== External links and additional sources ==
- Cheney, David M. "Diocese of Lipari". Catholic-Hierarchy.org. (for Chronology of Bishops) ^{[self-published]}
- Chow, Gabriel. "Diocese of Lipari (Italy)". GCatholic.org. (for Chronology of Bishops) ^{[self-published]}

Catholic Church titles
Preceded by Pietro Cancellieri	Bishop of Lipari; 1580–1585	Succeeded by Martín Acuña
