= Rapolla =

- Comune
- Comune di Rapolla
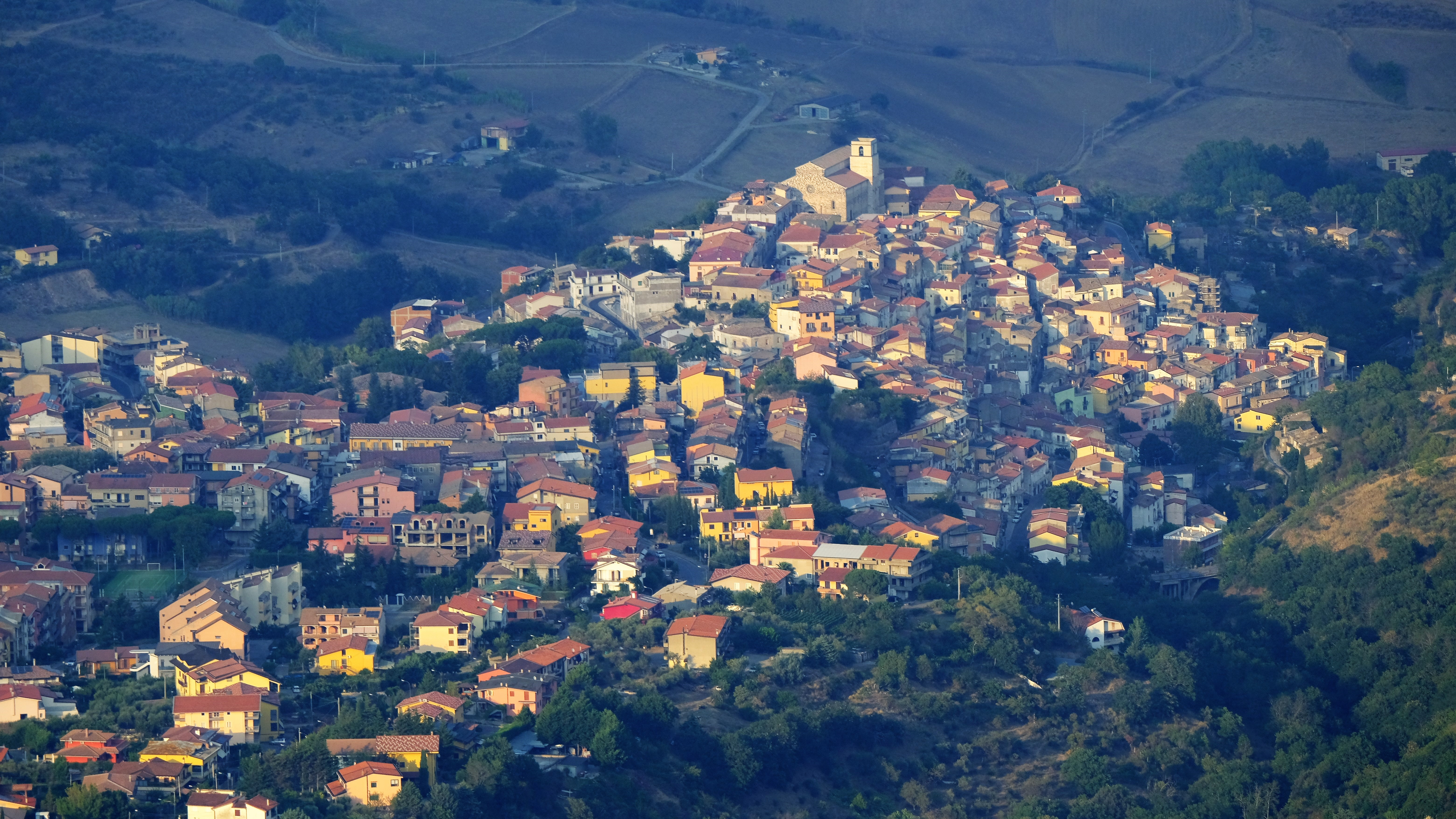
- View of Rapolla

- Coat of arms

- Location within Italy Location within Basilicata
- Coordinates: 40°59′N 15°40′E
- Country: Italy
- Region: Basilicata
- Province: Potenza (PZ)

Government
  - Mayor: Biagio Cristofaro

Area
  - Total: 29.87 km^{2} (11.53 sq mi)
- Elevation: 447 m (1,467 ft)

Population (30 September 2015)
  - Total: 4,432
  - Density: 148.4/km^{2} (384.3/sq mi)
- Demonym: Rapollesi
- Time zone: UTC+1 (CET)
  - Summer (DST): UTC+2 (CEST)
- Postal code: 85027
- Dialing code: 0972
- ISTAT code: 076064
- Patron saint: Saint Blaise
- Saint day: February 3
- Website: Official website

Rapolla is a town and comune in the province of Potenza, in the Southern Italian region of Basilicata. It is bounded by the comuni of Barile, Lavello, Melfi, Rionero in Vulture, Venosa.

The ancient sarcophagus of Rapolla takes its name from its find spot, near the town of Rapolla. It is from a workshop in Asia Minor and dates to the late II century AD. Now it's in the Museo Nazionale del Melfese, in the Castle of Melfi.

== Main sights ==
- Church of Santa Lucia (10th-11th centuries), with Romanesque, Apulian and Byzantine influences.
- Rapolla Cathedral, a 13th-century church, with Lombard Gothic influences in the façade portal. The bell tower (1209) is from Master Sasolo of Muro Lucano, who also sculpted the bas-reliefs with Adam and Eve and Annunciation inside the church.

== See also ==
- Diocese of Rapolla, former Catholic diocese
