= Adamo Gentile =

Roman Catholic bishop

Most Reverend Adamo Gentile
- Bishop of Lipari
- Church: Catholic Church
- Diocese: Diocese of Lipari
- In office: 1660–1662
- Predecessor: Benedetto Geraci
- Successor: Francesco Arata

Orders
- Consecration: 21 November 1660 by Antonio Barberini

Personal details
- Born: 1615 Caserta, Italy
- Died: November 1662 (age 47) Lipari, Italy

Adamo Gentile (1615 – November 1662) was a Roman Catholic prelate who served as Bishop of Lipari (1660–1662).

== Biography ==
Adamo Gentile was born in Caserta, Italy in 1615. On 15 November 1660, he was appointed during the papacy of Pope Gregory XIII as Bishop of Lipari. On 21 November 1660, he was consecrated bishop by Antonio Barberini, Archbishop of Reims, with Marco Antonio Bottoni, Titular Bishop of Coronea, and Carlo Fabrizio Giustiniani, Bishop of Accia and Mariana, serving as co-consecrators. He served as Bishop of Lipari until his death in November 1662.

== External links and additional sources ==
- Cheney, David M. "Diocese of Lipari". Catholic-Hierarchy.org. (for Chronology of Bishops) ^{[self-published]}
- Chow, Gabriel. "Diocese of Lipari (Italy)". GCatholic.org. (for Chronology of Bishops) ^{[self-published]}

Catholic Church titles
Preceded by Benedetto Geraci	Bishop of Lipari; 1660–1662	Succeeded by Francesco Arata
