= San Michele Arcangelo, Marsico Nuovo =

Church in Marsico Nuovo, Italy

Coordinates: 40°25′28″N 15°44′05″E

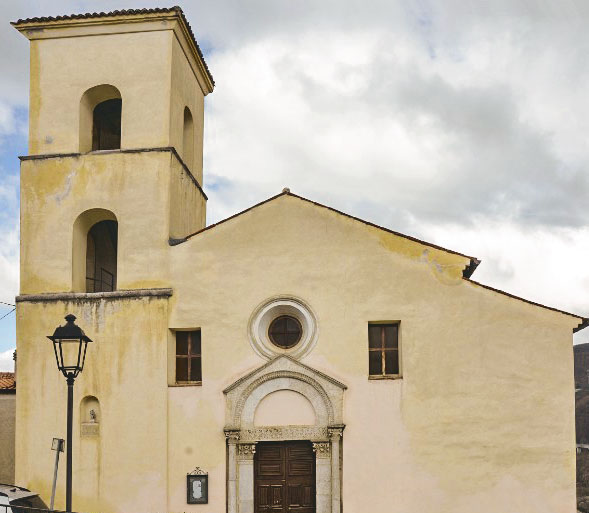

San Michele Arcangelo is a Roman Catholic church located on Largo San Gianuario, in front of the more imposing church of San Gianuario in the town of Marsico Nuovo, province of Potenza, region of Basilicata, Italy.

== History ==
The popularity of churches dedicated to the warrior angel was spread by the Lombards, and this and some documents attest to this church existing centuries before 1131, perhaps in the time of the Duchy of Benevento. The church at the site has undergone many reconstructions over the centuries. Many are due to damage by earthquakes, including one in 1700 cited by a plaque in the belltower.

The present facade was likely the original apse. The main portal in gothic-style dates to the 13th century or earlier, and is attributed to the Master Melchiorre da Montalbano.

The interior has a medieval stone baptismal font and an 18th-century painting on wood of the Archangel. The apse has remains of medieval frescoes showing Byzantine influence.
