= Luigi de Amato =

Italian Roman Catholic prelate

Most Reverend Luigi de Amato
- Bishop of San Marco
- Church: Catholic Church
- Diocese: Diocese of San Marco
- In office: 1515–1530
- Successor: Coriolamus Martyranus

Personal details
- Died: 1530 San Marco (Argentano), Italy

Luigi de Amato (died 1530) was a Roman Catholic prelate who served as Bishop of San Marco (1515–1530), Bishop of Lipari (1506–1515), and Bishop of Rapolla (1497–1506).

== Biography ==
On 12 September 1497, Luigi de Amato was appointed during the papacy of Pope Alexander VI as Bishop of Rapolla. On 19 September 1506, he was appointed during the papacy of Pope Julius II as Bishop of Lipari. On 26 January 1515, he was appointed during the papacy of Pope Leo X as Bishop of San Marco. He served as Bishop of San Marco until his death in 1530.

== See also ==
- Catholic Church in Italy

== External links and additional sources ==
- Cheney, David M. "Diocese of Rapolla". Catholic-Hierarchy.org. (for Chronology of Bishops) ^{[self-published]}
- Chow, Gabriel. "Diocese of Rapolla (Italy)". GCatholic.org. (for Chronology of Bishops) ^{[self-published]}
- Cheney, David M. "Diocese of Lipari". Catholic-Hierarchy.org. (for Chronology of Bishops) ^{[self-published]}
- Chow, Gabriel. "Diocese of Lipari (Italy)". GCatholic.org. (for Chronology of Bishops) ^{[self-published]}
- Cheney, David M. "Diocese of San Marco Argentano-Scalea". Catholic-Hierarchy.org. (for Chronology of Bishops) ^{[self-published]}
- Chow, Gabriel. "Diocese of San Marco Argentano-Scalea (Italy)". GCatholic.org. (for Chronology of Bishops) ^{[self-published]}

Catholic Church titles
Preceded by	Bishop of Rapolla; 1497–1506	Succeeded by
Preceded by Giacomo Carduini	Bishop of Lipari; 1506–1515	Succeeded by Antonio Zeno
Preceded by	Bishop of San Marco; 1515–1530	Succeeded by Coriolamus Martyranus
