= Giacomo Carduini =

Italian Roman Catholic prelate

Most Reverend Giacomo Carduini
- Bishop of Lipari
- Church: Catholic Church
- In office: 1489–1506
- Predecessor: Francesco da Stilo
- Successor: Luigi de Amato

Personal details
- Died: 1506 Lipari, Italy

Giacomo Carduini (died 1506) was a Roman Catholic prelate who served as Bishop of Lipari (1489–1506).

== Biography ==
On 9 October 1489, Giacomo Carduini was appointed during the papacy of Pope Innocent VIII as Bishop of Lipari. He served as Bishop of Lipari until his death in 1506.

== See also ==
- Catholic Church in Italy

== External links and additional sources ==
- Cheney, David M. "Diocese of Lipari". Catholic-Hierarchy.org. (for Chronology of Bishops) ^{[self-published]}
- Chow, Gabriel. "Diocese of Lipari (Italy)". GCatholic.org. (for Chronology of Bishops) ^{[self-published]}

Catholic Church titles
Preceded by Francesco da Stilo	Bishop of Lipari; 1489–1506	Succeeded by Luigi de Amato
