= Marco Antonio Bottoni =

Italian Roman Catholic prelate

Most Reverend Marco Antonio Bottoni
- Auxiliary Bishop of Frascati; Titular Bishop of Coronea
- Church: Catholic Church
- Diocese: Diocese of Frascati
- In office: 1655–?

Orders
- Consecration: 14 September 1655 by Giulio Cesare Sacchetti

Marco Antonio Bottoni, T.O.R. or Marco Antonio Bettoni was a Roman Catholic prelate who served as Auxiliary Bishop of Frascati (1655–?) and Titular Bishop of Coronea (1655–?).

== Biography ==
Marco Antonio Bottoni was ordained a priest in the Third Order Regular. On 30 August 1655, he was appointed during the papacy of Pope Alexander VII as Auxiliary Bishop of Frascati and Titular Bishop of Coronea. On 14 September 1655, he was consecrated bishop by Giulio Cesare Sacchetti, Cardinal-Bishop of Frascati, with Giovanni Alfonso Puccinelli, Archbishop of Manfredonia, and Francesco Gheri, Bishop of Cervia, serving as co-consecrators. It is uncertain how long he served as Auxiliary Bishop of Frascati.

== Episcopal succession ==
Episcopal succession of Marco Antonio Bottoni

While bishop, he was the principal co-consecrator of:

- Antonio Barberini, Cardinal-Bishop of Frascati (1655);
- François Pallu, Vicar Apostolic of Tonking (1658); and
- Adamo Gentile, Bishop of Lipari (1660).

== See also ==
- Catholic Church in Italy
