= Pietro Cancellieri =

Italian Roman Catholic prelate

The Most Reverend Pietro Cancellieri
- Bishop of Lipari
- Church: Catholic Church
- Diocese: Diocese of Lipari
- In office: 1571–1580
- Predecessor: Antonio Giustiniani
- Successor: Paolo Bellardito

Orders
- Consecration: by Giulio Antonio Santorio

Personal details
- Died: 1580 Lipari, Italy

Pietro Cancellieri (also Pietro Cavalieri) (died 1580) was a Roman Catholic prelate who served as Bishop of Lipari (1571–1580).

== Biography ==
On 3 October 1571, Pietro Cancellieri was appointed during the papacy of Pope Pius V as Bishop of Lipari. On 7 October 1571, he was consecrated bishop by Scipione Rebiba, Cardinal-Priest of Santa Maria in Trastevere, with Umberto Locati, Bishop of Bagnoregio, Eustachio Locatelli, Bishop of Reggio Emilia, serving as co-consecrators. He served as Bishop of Lipari until his death in 1580.

== See also ==
- Catholic Church in Italy

== External links and additional sources ==
- Cheney, David M. "Diocese of Lipari". Catholic-Hierarchy.org. (for Chronology of Bishops) ^{[self-published]}
- Chow, Gabriel. "Diocese of Lipari (Italy)". GCatholic.org. (for Chronology of Bishops) ^{[self-published]}

Catholic Church titles
Preceded by Antonio Giustiniani	Bishop of Lipari; 1571–1580	Succeeded by Paolo Bellardito
