= Francesco da Stilo =

Italian Roman Catholic prelate

Most Reverend Francesco da Stilo
- Bishop of Lipari
- Church: Catholic Church
- Diocese: Diocese of Lipari
- In office: 1461–1489
- Successor: Giacomo Carduini

Personal details
- Died: 1489 Lipari, Italy

Francesco da Stilo, O.P. (died 1489) was a Roman Catholic prelate who served as Bishop of Lipari (1461–1489).

== Biography ==
Francesco da Stilo was born ordained a priest in the Order of Preachers. On 19 June 1461, he was appointed during the papacy of Pope Pius II as Bishop of Lipari. He served as Bishop of Lipari until his death in 1489. While bishop, he was the principal co-consecrator of Dalmazio Gabrielli, Bishop of Siracusa (1469).

== External links and additional sources ==
- Cheney, David M. "Diocese of Lipari". Catholic-Hierarchy.org. (for Chronology of Bishops) ^{[self-published]}
- Chow, Gabriel. "Diocese of Lipari (Italy)". GCatholic.org. (for Chronology of Bishops) ^{[self-published]}

Catholic Church titles
Preceded by	Bishop of Lipari; 1461–1489	Succeeded by Giacomo Carduini
