= Martín Acuña =

Italian Roman Catholic prelate

Most Reverend Martín Acuña
- Bishop of Lipari
- Church: Catholic Church
- In office: 1585–1593
- Predecessor: Paolo Bellardito
- Successor: Juan Pedro González de Mendoza

Personal details
- Died: 1593 Lipari, Italy

Martín Acuña, O. Carm. (died 1593) was a Roman Catholic prelate who served as Bishop of Lipari (1585–1593).

== Biography ==
Martín Acuña was ordained a priest in the Carmelite Order. On 11 December 1585, he was appointed during the papacy of Pope Sixtus V as Bishop of Lipari. He served as Bishop of Lipari until his death in 1593.

== See also ==
- Catholic Church in Italy

== External links and additional sources ==
- Cheney, David M. "Diocese of Lipari". Catholic-Hierarchy.org. (for Chronology of Bishops) ^{[self-published]}
- Chow, Gabriel. "Diocese of Lipari (Italy)". GCatholic.org. (for Chronology of Bishops) ^{[self-published]}

Catholic Church titles
Preceded by Paolo Bellardito	Bishop of Lipari; 1585–1593	Succeeded by Juan Pedro González de Mendoza
