= Luiz Jorge de Barbuda =

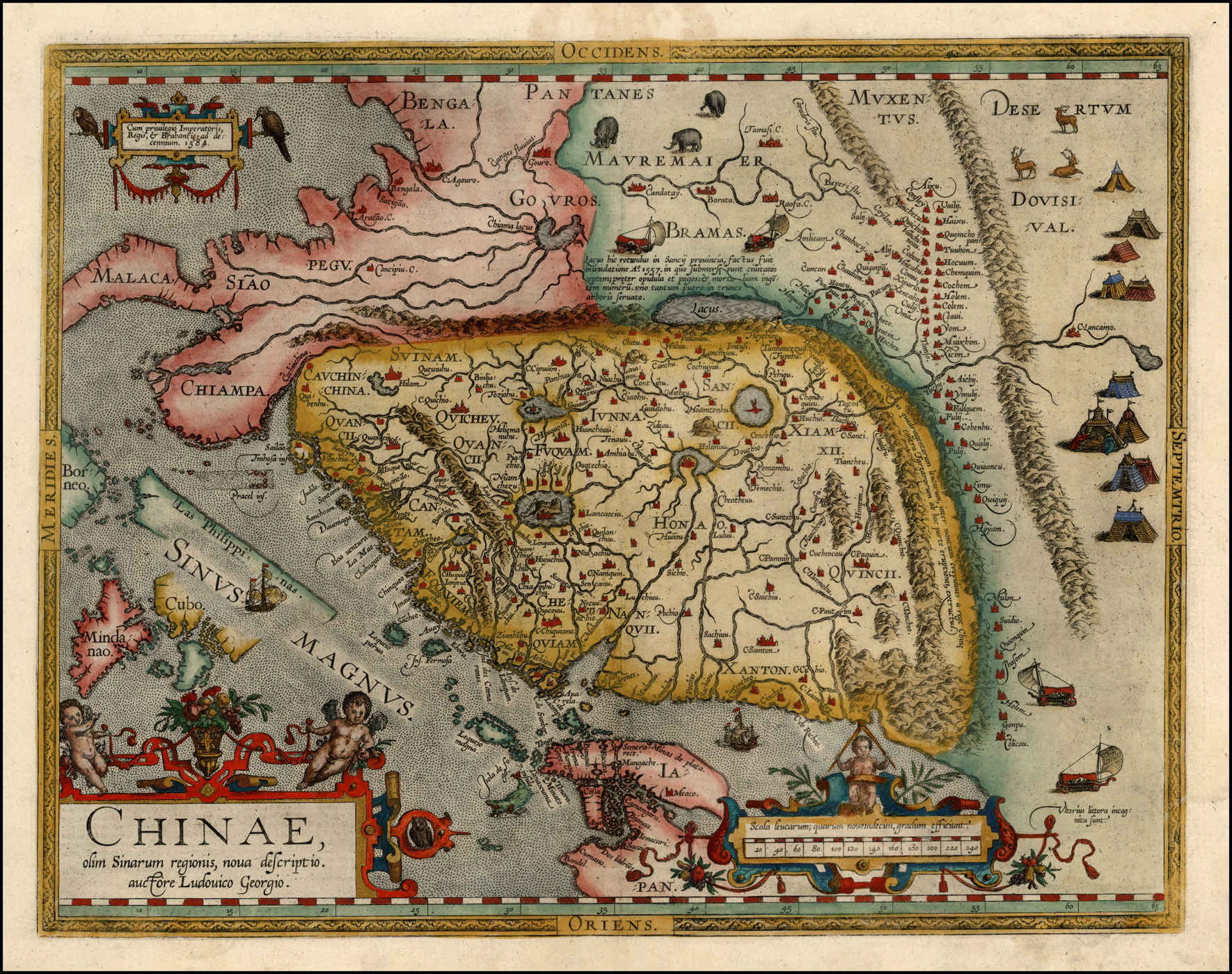
Chinae... nova descriptio by Ludovicus Georgius (1584)

Luiz Jorge de Barbuda (1564 (?)–1613 (?)) was a Portuguese cartographer. It is believed that he was the person known under the Latinized name Ludovicus Georgius, the creator of the influential map of China, published by Abraham Ortelius in 1584 in his Theatrum Orbis Terrarum.

During his life the cartographer was known under the Portuguese name Luiz Jorge, or its Hispanicized version Luis Jorge. Later Spanish writers would "disambiguate" his name using the place of his origin, calling him Luis Jorge de la Barbuda.

Even if Szcześniak's identification of Ludovicus Georgius as Luiz Jorge de Barbuda is correct, the birth date given by Szcześniak may not be in agreement with the biographical points given in Maroto & Piñeiro 2006. According to Maroto and Piñeiro, Luis Jorge was hired by Philip II of Spain in 1582 as the "master of making navigation charts and world maps" (maestro de hacer cartas de marear y cosmographias).

== The China map ==
Ludovicus Georgius' famous work, the 1584 map of China, appeared in Abraham Ortelius' Theatrum Orbis Terrarum. It was accompanied by a brief description of China and its language, which Ludovicus Georgius derived from Spain's first book on China: Bernardino de Escalante's Discurso de la navegacion que los Portugueses hacen a los Reinos y Provincias de Oriente, y de la noticia que se tiene de las grandezas del Reino de la China (1577). Both Ludovicus Georgius' map and Escalante-based "country summary" became highly influential, becoming the base for most European cartographic and literary work on the topic for several decades, until much more precise information from China-based Jesuit became available (Martino Martini, Novus Atlas Sinensis, 1655).

== Literature ==
- Szcześniak, Boleslaw (1954), "Matteo Ricci's Maps of China", Imago Mundi, 11: 127–136, doi:10.1080/03085695408592065, JSTOR 1150185
- Maroto, M. I. Vicente; Piñeiro, Mariano Esteban (2006), Aspectos de la ciencia aplicada en la España del siglo de oro. Estudios de historia de la ciencia y de la técnica (2 ed.), Junta de Castilla y León, Consejería de Cultura y Turismo, ISBN 8497183509
- Lach, Donald F. (1965), Asia in the making of Europe, vol. I, Book Two, The University of Chicago Press
