= Diocese of Lipari =

Latin Catholic diocese in Italy (5th century - 1986)

Diocese of Lipari Dioecesis Liparensis
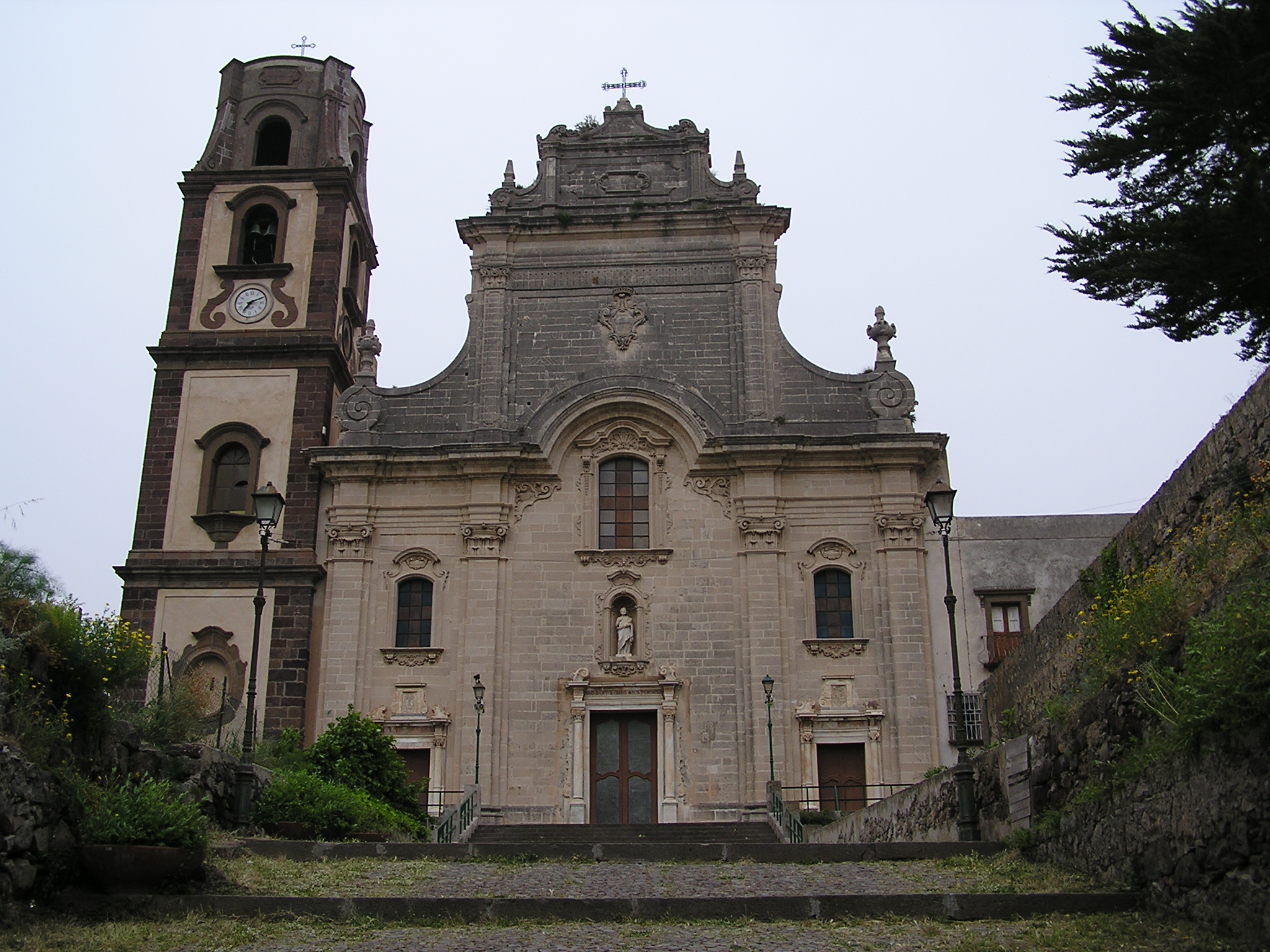
- Cathedral of S. Bartolommeo

Location
- Country: Italy
- Ecclesiastical province: Messina-Lipari-Santa Lucia del Mela

Statistics
- Population: Total; Catholics: (as of 1980); 13,550 (est.); 13,048 (est.) (96.3%)
- Parishes: 26

Information
- Denomination: Catholic Church
- Sui iuris church: Latin Church
- Rite: Roman Rite
- Established: 12th Century
- Cathedral: Cattedrale di S. Bartolomeo
- Secular priests: 24

Current leadership
- Pope: Leo XIV
- Archbishop: Giovanni Accolla (Messina-Lipari-Santa Lucia de Mela)

Website
- www.diocesimessina.it

The Diocese of Lipari was a Latin Church diocese of the Catholic Church located in the town of Lipari in the Aeolian Islands of Sicily, Italy. The diocese consisted of the entire island of Lipari as well as seven smaller adjacent islands. In 1986, it was suppressed, and its territory incorporated into the Archdiocese of Messina-Lipari-Santa Lucia del Mela.

== History ==
=== Geology ===
Lipari is a volcanic island, and as a result often suffers earthquakes, occasionally of considerable but local force. A major eruption took place in 729, leaving a high pumice cone which is 476m (1570 feet) high; the population must have fled, at least temporarily. Another major eruption took place on the north end of Lipari at Rocche Rosse in 1220.

One crater, called Monte Pilato, is mined for pumice and has numerous caves. Anachronistically, Monte Pilato figures in the romance of Agatho, the purported first bishop of the island in the 260's. There are still hot springs and fumaroles.

=== Pre-Saracen diocese ===
The diocese of Lipari was already in existence by the 5th century. The names of several early bishops are attested, the earliest of whom is Augustus. Bishop Augustus attended the Roman synods of 501 and 502. On 29 February 592, Pope Gregory I ordered Paulinus, the exiled bishop of Tauriana (Abruzzi), to take charge of Lipari, with was without a priest, and that he should reside there; he ordered Bishop Paulinus to be obedient to the bishop of Syracuse, and that he should visit Tauriana as often as the opportunity presented itself.

The Emperor Leo III the Isaurian (717–741) removed the dioceses of Sicily, including Lipari, from Roman control and made them suffragans of the Ecumenical Patriarchate of Constantinople, and immediately subject to the metropolitan of Syracuse. In the mid-9th (or 10th) century, Basil of Ialimbana revised the geography of George of Cyprus with the addition of a Notitia episcopuum, in which the diocese appears as a suffragan of Syracuse. Bishop Basilius of Lipari therefore attended the Second Council of Nicaea in 787.

=== The Norman diocese ===
The Benedictine monastery of Saint Bartholomew de Lipara was founded by Roger d'Hautville and his brother Robert Guiscard before 1085. In an evident response to a petition, Pope Urban II wrote to Abbot Ambrosius on 3 June 1091. In the letter, the pope acknowledged that an Emperor Constantine had granted the Papacy control over all the bishops of the island, as Pope Gregory I had recognized, but that Christianity had been wiped out by the Saracens. But now the small population did not now merit a bishopric, while the pope was willing to grant the monastery the control of the entire island of Lipari. He took the monastery under papal protection, and granted the monks the right to elect their abbot, who was to be consecrated by the pope, all this in consideration of an annual payment of an ounce of gold. In 1094, the abbey of Saint Bartholomew was united with the abbey of Patti, which Roger had also established. On 14 September 1131, at the request of King Roger II, Pope Anacletus II established the monastery of Lipara as a diocese, and assigned it as a suffragan of the archdiocese of Messana. In October, Archbishop Hugo of Messana carried out the necessary ceremonies of erection. He also established the monastery of S. Salvator in Patti as a bishopric. Neither creation was approved by Pope Innocent II.

The union of Lipari and Patti under a single bishop is found by 1154, when "Gilbertus ven. electus Pactensis mon." and "Gillibertus Lupariae et Pactarum electus" are found. Pope Alexander III recognized the union by 1166. The union was dissolved by Pope Boniface IX on 16 April 1399.

Bishop Stephanus (attested 1180 – 1199) attended the consecration of the church of Saint Peter di Bagnara in Palermo in 1199.

=== Aragonese Sicily ===
After the Sicilian Vespers (1282), Lipari remained under the control of the Angevan kings of Naples, while Patti became subject to the Aragonese kings of Sicily. Pope Martin IV, considering the disorders in Sicily, reserved to the Papacy the right to appoint bishops there. Bishop Pandulf's successor, Canon Ioannes, was also appointed by Benedict XI, on 31 January 1304, employing the same reservation.

The "Customs of the city of Patti" were granted by King Frederick III of Sicily on 11 July 1312.

In 1544 the pirate Barbarossa completely depopulated the island. It was at the direction of the Emperor Charles V, who noted the island's strategic position, that it was repopulated., by a colony of Spaniards. Bishop Baldo Ferratini (1534–1558) was given the position of papal legate, so that he could bestow indulgences on persons contributing to the building of a new cathedral.

In the bull "Romanus Pontifex," dated 29 November 1627, Pope Urban VIII removed the diocese of Lipari from the ecclesiastical province of Messina, and made it directly subject to the Papacy. The privilege was revoked in the 19th century, and Lipari again became a suffragan of Messina.

In 1692, the city of Lipari had a population of c. 10,000 persons. It was under the civil government of the king of Spain, and the direct spiritual rule of the pope, who alone had the right to consecrate its bishop.

=== Bourbon Sicily ===
Because of the various treaty arrangements that fortified the Peace of Utrecht, Sicily found itself removed from the control of King Philip V of Spain, and assigned to the House of Savoy under King Victor Amadeus II. This arrangement lasted from 1713 to 1720, when an exchange of Sicily for Sardinia was made with the Hapsburg Charles VI / IV in the Treaty of The Hague (1720). The bishop of Lipari during this period was the Catanian Nicola Maria Tedeschi, O.S.B. (1710–1722), who was appointed by Pope Clement XI, but who was kept in Rome as Secretary of the Congregation of Rites and member of the Congregation of Bishops. In 1711, the bishop's agent's in Lipari sold a consignment of legumes, and the government immediately imposed a tax on the transaction. The bishop reacted by excommunicating the tax collectors and imposing an interdict in Lipari. The tax collectors appealed to the civil tribunal of the Monarchy, and were absolved. Bishop Tedeschi immediately appealed to the Congregation of Immunity in Rome, that civil officials had no right to remove censures imposed by a bishop, and was immediately followed by a similar appeal by the bishops of Sicily. The congregation ruled in their favor, stating that no one but the pope had the right to remove such episcopal censures. The stubborn bishop continued, until Clement XI revoked the censures on 2 September 1719.

In 1743, the city of Lipari had about 13,000 inhabitants, under the temporal authority of the King of Naples. The diocese was directly subject to the authority of the Pope, that is, Lipari had no regional Metropolitan. The cathedral had a Chapter which contained four dignities (Archdeacon, Deacon, Cantor, Treasurer) and fifteen Canons.

Bishop Vincenzo Maria de Francisco e Galletti died of cancer on 19 July 1769, and left the diocese of Lipari 25,000 scudi for the purpose of establishing a seminary, and to augment the prebends of the cathedral Chapter.

In 1789, a dispute arose between King Ferdinand and Pope Pius VI over the patronage of the diocese of Lipari, which was directly dependent on the Holy See. Ferdinand nominated Gaetano Garrasi, O.E.S.A., a native of Catania, whom the pope refused to consecrate; he was bishop-elect until the pope named him archbishop of Messenia on 18 June 1792, having been nominated by the king on 20 January. The king then nominated the Theatine Saverio Granata of Messina, whom the pope also rejected, and who was therefoer only bishop-elect until he was nominated bishop of Agrigento by the king on 12 May 1795. The diocese was being administered by the abbot of Santa Lucia di Mela, Bishop Carlo Santacolombo, titular bishop of Anemurium, who died in 1801. Pius VI had been deposed in February 1798 and taken as a prisoner to France, where he died in Valence on 29 August 1799. A new pope was not elected until 14 March 1800.

On 9 August 1802, Pope Pius VII appointed Domenico Spoto bishop of Lipari.

In accordance with Article XXVIII of the Concordat of 1818 between Pope Pius VII and King Ferdinand I of the Two Sicilies, the king and his successors were granted the privilege of nominating candidates for all archepiscopal and episcopal vacancies in the Kingdom of the Two Sicilies. The indult, "Sinceritas fidei", was signed by Pius VII on 7 March 1818.

=== Suppression of the diocese ===
On September 30, 1986, as part of a Vatican effort to reduce the number of redundant Italian dioceses, the diocese of Lipari was suppressed as an independent entity and incorporated into the Archdiocese of Messina-Lipari-Santa Lucia del Mela.

The church of San Cristoforo di Canneto di Lipari was raised to the rank of "minor basilica" in 2004 by Pope John Paul II.

== See also ==
- Diocese of Patti
- Archdiocese of Messina-Lipari-Santa Lucia del Mela

== Bishops ==
=== to 1400 ===
[ Agatho (c. 254) ]

- Augustus (501, 502)
- ? Venantius (553)
- Agatho (593)
- [Paulinus] (under Pope Gregory I)
- Peregrinus (c. 660)
- Basilius (c. 787)
- Samuel (c. 879)

Sede Vacante
...

- Gilibertus (1157 – 1166)
- Stephanus (1180 – 1199)
- Anselmus (c. 1208 – 1227?)
- Jacobus ( – 25 September 1225)
- Paganus (10 October 1229 – 3 March 1246)
- Philippus (attested 1250)
- Bartholomaeus de Lentino, O.P. (5 January 1254 – 1282)
- Pandulfus (25 February 1286 – 4 July 1296)
- Joannes, O.P. (1304 – 1325)
- Pietro, O.P. (c. 1325)
- Francesco (c. 1342)
- Petrus de Teutonico, O.Min. (15 February 1346 – 21 January 1354)
- Petrus de Thomas, O.Carm. (1354 – 10 May 1359)
- Joannes Graphei, O.Min. (17 July 1360 – 1373)
- Ubertinus de Coriliono, O.Min. (28 November 1373 – 1386)
- Franciscus, O.P. (30 May 1386 – 18 March 1388)
- Ubertinus de Coriliono, O.Min. (restored, 16 May 1390 – 18 August 1397)
- Joannes de Cavosa Avignon Obedience
- Franciscus Gattulus (18 December 1397 – 18 April 1399)

Separation of Patti and Lipari – 1399

=== from 1400 to 1800 ===
- Antonius (11 June 1400 – 1402?)
- Thomas (ca. 1402 – 1419?)
- Antonius de Comite (31 July 1419 – 31 July 1432)
- Bartolomeo da Salerno (1432 – 1458)
- Francesco da Stilo, O.P. (1461–1489)
- Giacomo Carduini (1489–1506 Died)
- Luigi de Amato (1506–1515)
- Antonio Genonius (1515–1530 ?)
- Petrus (c. 1530)
- Gregorio Magalotti (1532–1534)
- Baldo Ferratini (1534–1558)
- Annibaldo Spatafora (1553–1554)
- Filippo Lancia (1554–1564)
- Antonio Giustiniani, O.P. (1564–1571)
- Pietro Cancellieri (Cavalieri) (3 October 1571 – 1580)
- Paolo Bellardito (17 October 1580 – 1585 Resigned)
- Martín Acuña, O. Carm. (11 December 1585 – 1593 Died)
- Juan Pedro González de Mendoza, O.S.A. (7 June 1593 – 1599)
- Alfonso Vidal, O.F.M. (23 November 1599– 17 September 1618)
- Alberto Caccano, O.P. (1618–1627 Died)

Directly subject to Holy See

- Giuseppe Candido (1627–1644)
- Agostino Candido (1645–1650)
- Benedetto Geraci (1650–1660)
- Adamo Gentile (1660–1662)
- Francesco Arata (1663–1690)
- Gaetano de Castillo, C.R. (1691–1694 Died)
- Gerolamo Ventimiglia, C.R. (1694–1709 Died)
- Nicola Maria Tedeschi, O.S.B. (1710–1722 Resigned)
- Pietro Vincenzo Platamone, O.P. (1722–1733 Died)
- Bernardo Maria Beamonte, O.C.D. (11 May 1733 – 24 July 1742)
- Francesco Maria Miceli (1743–1753 Died)
- Vincenzo Maria de Francisco e Galletti, O.P. (1753–1769 Died)
- Bonaventura Prestandrea, O.F.M. Conv. (1769–1777 Died)
- Giuseppe Coppula (1778–1789 Died)

Sede Vacante (1789–1802)

=== since 1800 ===
- Domenico Spoto (1802–1804)
- Antonino Reggio (1804–1806)
- Silvestro Todaro, O.F.M. Conv. (1807–1816)
- Carlo Maria Lenzi, Sch. P. (1818–1825)
- Pietro Tasca (1826–1827)
- Giovanni Portelli (1831–1838)
- Giovanni Maria Visconte Proto, O.S.B. (1839–1844)
- Bonaventura Attanasio, C.SS.R.(1844–1857 Resigned)
- Ludovico Ideo, O.P. (1858–1880)
- Mariano Palermo (1881–1887)
- Giovanni Pietro Natoli (1890–1898 Died)
- Nicola Maria Audino (1898–1903 Appointed, Bishop of Mazara del Vallo)
- Francesco Maria Raiti, O. Carm. (1903–1906 Appointed, Bishop of Trapani)
- Angelo Paino (1909–1921 Appointed, Coadjutor Archbishop of Messina)
- Bernardino Salvatore Re, O.F.M. Cap. (1928–1963 Died)
- Salvatore Nicolosi (1963–1970 Appointed, Bishop of Noto)
- Ignazio Cannavò (1977–1986 Appointed, Archbishop of Messina-Lipari-Santa Lucia del Mela)

== See also ==
- Catholic Church in Italy

== Sources ==
=== Reference Works ===
- Eubel, Conradus, ed. (1913). Hierarchia catholica (in Latin). Vol. 1 (Tomus 1) (second ed.). Münster: Libreria Regensbergiana. pp. 181–182.. Archived.
- Eubel, Conradus, ed. (1914). Hierarchia catholica (in Latin). Vol. 2 (Tomus 2) (second ed.). Münster: Libreria Regensbergiana. p. 125.. Archived.
- Eubel, Conradus, ed. (1923). Hierarchia catholica (in Latin). Vol. 3 (Tomus 3) (second ed.). Münster: Libreria Regensbergiana. p. 163.. Archived.
- Gams, Pius Bonifatius (1873). Series episcoporum Ecclesiae catholicae: quotquot innotuerunt a beato Petro apostolo. Ratisbon: Typis et Sumptibus Georgii Josephi Manz. p. 953. (Use with caution; obsolete)
- Gauchat, Patritius (Patrice) (1935). Hierarchia catholica (in Latin). Vol. 4 (IV) (1592-1667). Münster: Libraria Regensbergiana.
- Ritzler, Remigius; Sefrin, Pirminus (1952). Hierarchia catholica medii et recentis aevi (in Latin). Vol. 5 (V) (1667-1730). Patavii: Messagero di S. Antonio.
- Ritzler, Remigius; Sefrin, Pirminus (1958). Hierarchia catholica medii et recentis aevi (in Latin). Vol. 6 (1730-1799). Patavii: Messagero di S. Antonio.
- Ritzler, Remigius; Sefrin, Pirminus (1968). Hierarchia Catholica medii et recentioris aevi (in Latin). Vol. 7 (1800–1846). Monasterii: Libr. Regensburgiana.
- Ritzler, Remigius; Sefrin, Pirminus (1978). Hierarchia catholica Medii et recentioris aevi (in Latin). Vol. 8 (1846–1903). Il Messaggero di S. Antonio.
- Pięta, Zenon (2002). Hierarchia catholica medii et recentioris aevi (in Latin). Vol. 9 (1903–1922). Padua: Messagero di San Antonio. ISBN 978-88-250-1000-8.

=== Studies ===
- Cappelletti, Giuseppe (1870). Le chiese d'Italia dalla loro origine sino ai nostri giorni (in Italian). Vol. vigesimoprimo (21). Venezia: Antonelli. pp. 572–579.
- D'Avino, Vincenzio (1848). Cenni storici sulle chiese arcivescovili, vescovili, e prelatizie (nullius) del regno delle due Sicilie (in Italian). Naples: dalle stampe di Ranucci. pp. 298–300. [article by Carlo Rodriquez]
- Giardina, Noccolo (1888). Patti e la cronacs del suo vescovato. (in Italian). Siena 1888)
- Kamp, Norbert (1975). Kirche und Monarchie im staufischen Königreich Sizilien: I. Prosopographische Grundlegung, Bistumer und Bischofe des Konigreichs 1194–1266: 3. Sizilien München: Wilhelm Fink 1975, pp. 1078–1108.
- Kehr, Paul Fridolin, et al. (1975). Italia Pontificia (in Latin), Vol. X: Calabria – Insulae (Turici: Weidmann 1975), pp. 355–361.
- La Mantia, Vito (1900). Antiche consuetudini delle città di Sicilia (in Italian) Palermo: A. Reber 1900. (pp. xcvii-cxx;; 63-78)
- Lanzoni, Francesco (1927). Le diocesi d'Italia dalle origini al principio del secolo VII (an. 604) (in Italian). Rome: Biblioteca Apostolica Vaticana. p. 650.
- Pirro, Rocco (1733). Antonino Mongitore (ed.). Sicilia sacra disquisitionibus et notitiis illustrata. Vol. 2 (Tomus secundus) (third ed.). haeredes P. Coppulae. pp. 948–968.
- Rodriquez, Carlo "Breve cenno storico sulla Chiesa Liparese," Giornale di scienze, letteratura ed arti per la Sicilia (in Italian). Vol. 75. 1841. pp. 33–66.
- Savagnone, F. Guglielmo (1912). "Concili e sinodi di Sicilia," (in Italian), in: Atti della reale Accademia di scienze, lettere e belle arti di Palermo terza serie, Vol. 9. Palermo: Impresa generale d'Affissione e Publicità, 1912. pp. 3-212 + Appendice.
- Ughelli, Ferdinando; Coleti, Nicolò (1717). Italia sacra: sive De episcopis Italiae et insularum adjacentium, rebusque abiis praeclare gestis... (in Latin). Vol. Tomus primus. Venice: Sebastianum Coleti. pp. 771–789.
