= Torrecilla en Cameros =

- Municipality
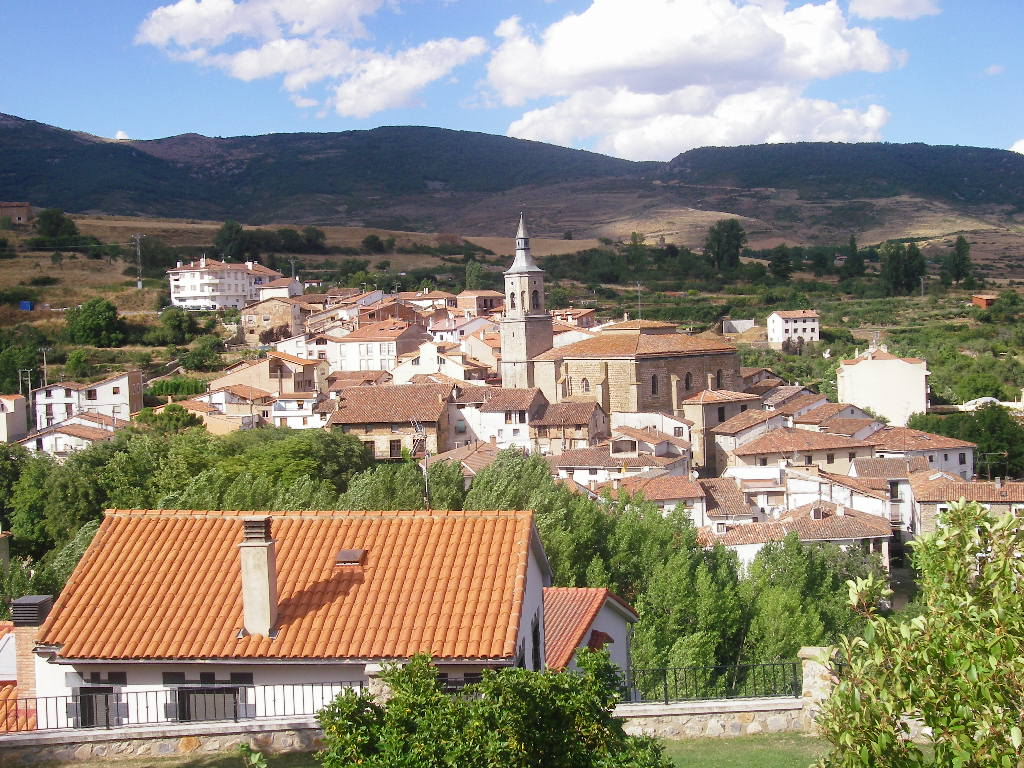
- Skyline of Torrecilla en Cameros

- Coat of arms

- Location within La Rioja, Spain Location within Spain
- Coordinates: 42°15′22″N 2°37′49″W
- Country: Spain
- Autonomous community: La Rioja
- Comarca: Camero Nuevo

Government
  - Mayor: Sergio Martínez Astola (PSOE)

Area
  - Total: 30.47 km^{2} (11.76 sq mi)
- Elevation: 740 m (2,430 ft)

Population (2025-01-01)
  - Total: 474
- Demonym(s): torrecillano, na
- Postal code: 26100
- Website: Official website

Torrecilla en Cameros is a village in the province and autonomous community of La Rioja, Spain. The municipality covers an area of 30.47 square kilometres (11.76 sq mi) and as of 2011 had a population of 555 people.
