= Antonio Giustiniani (archbishop of Lipari) =

Italian Roman Catholic prelate

Most Reverend Antonio Giustiniani
- Archbishop (Personal Title) of Lipari
- Church: Catholic Church
- Diocese: Diocese of Lipari
- In office: 1564–1571
- Predecessor: Filippo Lancia
- Successor: Pietro Cancellieri
- Previous post: Archbishop of Naxos (1562–1564)

Personal details
- Died: 1571 Lipari, Italy

Antonio Giustiniani, O.P (died 1571) was a Roman Catholic prelate who served as Archbishop (Personal Title) of Lipari (1564–1571) and Archbishop of Naxos (1562–1564).

== Biography ==
Antonio Giustiniani was ordained a priest in the Order of Preachers. On 16 December 1562, he was appointed during the papacy of Pope Pius IV as Archbishop of Naxos. On 12 May 1564, he was appointed during the papacy of Pope Pius IV as Archbishop (Personal Title) of Lipari. He served as Archbishop of Lipari until his death in 1571.

== External links and additional sources ==
- Cheney, David M. "Archdiocese of Naxos, Andros, Tinos e Mykonos". Catholic-Hierarchy.org. (for Chronology of Bishops) ^{[self-published]}
- Chow, Gabriel. "Metropolitan Archdiocese of Naxos–Andros–Tinos–Mykonos (Greece)". GCatholic.org. (for Chronology of Bishops) ^{[self-published]}
- Cheney, David M. "Diocese of Lipari". Catholic-Hierarchy.org. (for Chronology of Bishops) ^{[self-published]}
- Chow, Gabriel. "Diocese of Lipari (Italy)". GCatholic.org. (for Chronology of Bishops) ^{[self-published]}

Catholic Church titles
| Preceded by Sebastiano Leccavella | Archbishop of Naxos; 1562–1564 | Succeeded by Francesco Pisani (bishop) |
| Preceded by Filippo Lancia | Archbishop (Personal Title) of Lipari; 1564–1571 | Succeeded by Pietro Cancellieri |
