= Roman Catholic Diocese of Rapolla =

The Catholic Diocese of Rapolla, in Basilicata, existed from the eleventh century until 1528. In that year it was united with the diocese of Melfi, to form the diocese of Melfi e Rapolla. The diocese was suppressed in 1986.

== History ==
The town of Rapolla is at a distance of 5.6km or 3.5 mi south-southwest of Melfi, though a mountain pass intervenes. The earliest mention of the town occurs in 967 when Pandolfo the Lombard is called Prince of Conza and Rapolla.

The Normans took Rapolla from the Greeks in 1042, and fortified it with works still to be seen. It appears that the town received its bishopric from Pope Nicholas II (1059–1061). From the beginning, the diocese was directly subordinate to the pope. The town was an episcopal see in the time of Pope Gregory VII. In 1183 three barons of Rapolla, Liardo of Rapolla, Sansone of Rapallo, and Guido di Rocca, joined the expedition to the Holy Land. In 1254, Rapolla wanted to follow the party of the papacy against Manfred, for which the town was virtually destroyed by Galvano Lancia.

In 1321, the diocese of Rapolla became the object of a scandal that reached from Benevento to Avignon. Bishop Bernardo (1316–1330) collected a force of soldiers and descended on the church of San Donato in the district of Ravella, which was in the possession of P. Nicolaus Guidonis di Rivacandida, who had obtained the post by a collation of Pope John XXII. Showing Nicolaus papal documents, Bishop Bernardo ejected him and threw him into prison, stating that he would never release Nicholas as long as the present pope was alive. Nicholas escaped, however, after seven months, and fled to Avignon. Pope John responded with indignation, and dispatched a letter on 4 September 1321 to Master Guillermo Balaeto, the Rector of Benevento, mandating that he cite Bishop Bernardo to appear in his court. The outcome is unknown, but Bishop Bernardo remained bishop of Rapolla.

The cathedral of Rapolla was dedicated to the Taking Up of the Body of the Virgin Mary into Heaven and was administered by a Chapter composed of four dignities (the Archdeacon, the Cantor, the Treasurer, and the Vice-Cantor) and four canons. In 1748, there were three dignities and five canons. The campanile of the cathedral had been partially destroyed in the earthquake of 1694 but was restored. In December 1857, the old Lombard cathedral of Rapolla was destroyed by a major earthquake. Seventy people died in Rapolla.

On 16 March 1528, the diocese of Rapolla was united with the diocese of Melfi, aeque personalities.

There was an evangelical church in Rapolla. In 1933 it was staffed by a former Roman Catholic priest, Antonio Fegatelli.

On 30 September 1986, Pope John Paul II ordered that the dioceses of Melfi, Rapolla, and Venosa be merged into one diocese with one bishop, with the Latin title Dioecesis Melphiensis-Rapollensis-Venusina. The seat of the diocese was to be in Melphi, and the cathedral of Melfi was to serve as the cathedral of the merged dioceses. The cathedrals in Rapolla and Venosa were to become co-cathedrals, and the cathedral Chapters were each to be a Capitulum Concathedralis. There was to be only one diocesan Tribunal, in Melfi, and likewise one seminary, one College of Consultors, and one Priests' Council. The territory of the new diocese was to include the territory of the former dioceses of Melphi, Rapolla, and Venosa. The diocese of Rapolla was completely suppressed.

== Bishops ==
=== to 1300 ===
- Orso (1072–1079)

...

- Johannes (1091–1105)

...

- Rogerius (1141–1152)

...

- Nicolaus (1179–1180)
- Hubertus (1180–1183)

...

- Richardus (c.1205–1209)
- [Unknown] (1215–1217)
- [Unknown] (1122)

...

- Johannes (1238–1263)

Bartholomaeus (1266) Bishop-elect

- Ammirato (1269–1275)
- Rogerius (1275–1280)
- Rogerius (1290–1307)

=== 1300 to 1528 ===
- Pietro Scarrier, O.Min. (1308–1314)
- Bernardo (1316–1330)
- Bernardus di Palma (1330–1342)
- Joannes (1342–1346)
- Geraldus, O.P. (1346–1348)
- Nicolas de Cryptamaynarda, O.Min. (1348–1370)
- Benedetto Cavalcanti, O.F.M. (8 Jan 1371 – 1375 Died)
- Angelo Acciaioli (1375–1386)
- Nicolas (attested 1383) Roman Obedience
- Angelo Roman Obedience
- Antonius (1386– ? ) Avignon Obedience
- Thomas (c. 1390–1397) Roman Obedience
- Lucas (1398–1446) Roman Obedience
- Franciscus de Oliveto, O.S.B. (1447–1455)
- Pietro Minutolo (1455–1478)
- Vincentius Galeota (1478–1482)
- Colantonius Lentulus (1482)
- Malitia de Gesualdo (1482–1488)
- Troilo Carafa (1488–1497)
- Luigi de Amato (12 Sep 1497 –1506)
- Gilberto Sanilio (1506–1520)
- Raimondo Sanilio (1520–1528)

== Bibliography ==
- Eubel, Conradus, ed. (1913). Hierarchia catholica (in Latin). Vol. Tomus 1 (second ed.). Münster: Libreria Regensbergiana.
- Eubel, Conradus, ed. (1914). Hierarchia catholica (in Latin). Vol. Tomus 2 (second ed.). Münster: Libreria Regensbergiana.
- Eubel, Conradus; Gulik, Guilelmus (1923). Hierarchia catholica (in Latin). Vol. 3 (second ed.). Münster: Libreria Regensbergiana.
- Gams, Pius Bonifatius (1873). Series episcoporum Ecclesiae catholicae: quotquot innotuerunt a beato Petro apostolo (in Latin). Ratisbon: Typis et Sumptibus Georgii Josephi Manz. p. 915.
- Gauchat, Patritius (Patrice) (1935). Hierarchia catholica (in Latin). Vol. IV (1592-1667). Münster: Libraria Regensbergiana.

=== Studies ===
- Cappelletti, Giuseppe (1870). Le chiese d'Italia: dalla loro origine sino ai nostri giorni. (in Italian). Vol. vigesimoprimo (21). Venezia: G. Antonelli. pp. 453-457.
- Chiaromonte, Francesco (1849). Cenno storico sulla chiesa vescovile di Rapolla. (in Italian). 2nd Edition. Napoli: tip. all'insegna del Diogene, 1849.
- D'Avino, Vincenzio (1848). Cenni storici sulle chiese arcivescovili, vescovili, e prelatizie (nullius) del regno delle due Sicilie (in Italian). Naples: dalle stampe di Ranucci. pp. 556–562. [article by Francesco Chiaromonte]
- Fortunato, G. (1903). "Due nuovi vescovi della chiesa di Rapolla," (in Italian), in: Napoli nobilissima XII (1903) 42-46.
- Kamp, Norbert (1975). Kirche und Monarchie im staufischen Königreich Sizilien: I. Prosopographische Grundlegung, Bistumer und Bistümer und Bischöfe des Konigreichs 1194–1266: 2. Apulien und Calabrien München: Wilhelm Fink 1975. pp. 501-506.
- Kehr, Paulus Fridolin (1962). Italia pontificia. Regesta pontificum Romanorum. Vol. IX: Samnia – Apulia – Lucania. Berlin: Weidmann. (in Latin). Pp. 154 500-504.
- Ughelli, Ferdinando; Coleti, Niccolò (1721). Italia sacra, sive De Episcopis Italiae (in Latin). Vol. 7 (secunda ed.). Venice: apud Sebastianum Coleti. pp. 878=884.
