= Marsico Nuovo Cathedral =

Cathedral in Marsico Nuovo, Italy

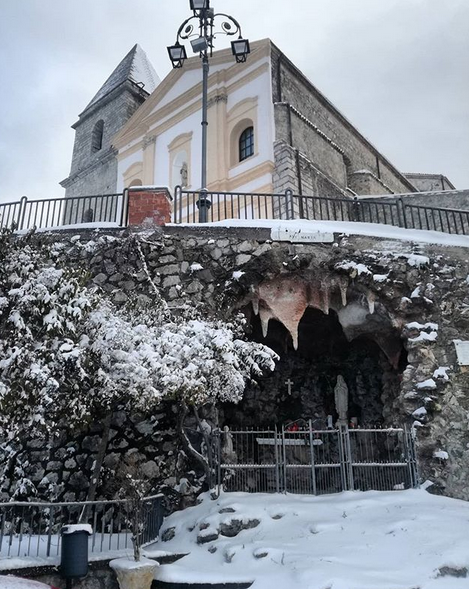
Marsico Nuovo Cathedral.

Marsico Nuovo Cathedral (Italian: Concattedrale di Marsico Nuovo; Concattedrale di Santa Maria Assunta e San Giorgio) is a Roman Catholic cathedral, dedicated to the Assumption of the Virgin Mary and Saint George, in the town of Marsico Nuovo, province of Potenza, region of Basilicata, Italy. It stands on a hill that rises above the town. Formerly the seat of the diocese of Marsico Nuovo, it has been a co-cathedral within the Archdiocese of Potenza-Muro Lucano-Marsico Nuovo since 1986.

== History ==
The structure was erected in 1131 under the patronage of the bishop Enrico and count Goffredo. This Romanesque church was destroyed by a fire in 1807. A new church was commissioned by the bishop Ignazio Maroldo, and completed by 1829, but an earthquake razed the building in 1857. Finally, a new cathedral was begun in 1875 and completed in 1899. The belltower dates from 1293, commissioned by Count Tommaso Sanseverino.

The main portal dates from the 16th century and is surrounded by an 18th-century relief of the Virgin. The church now has a single nave. The interior contains a wooden Madonna and Child from the 13th-century, and a 17th-century pulpit and choir. It has some paintings by Nicola Peccheneda.

== See also ==
- Roman Catholic Diocese of Marsico Nuovo
