= Archdiocese of Catania =

Roman Catholic archdiocese in Italy

Archdiocese of Catania Archidioecesis Catanensis Arcidiocesi di Catania

Catholic
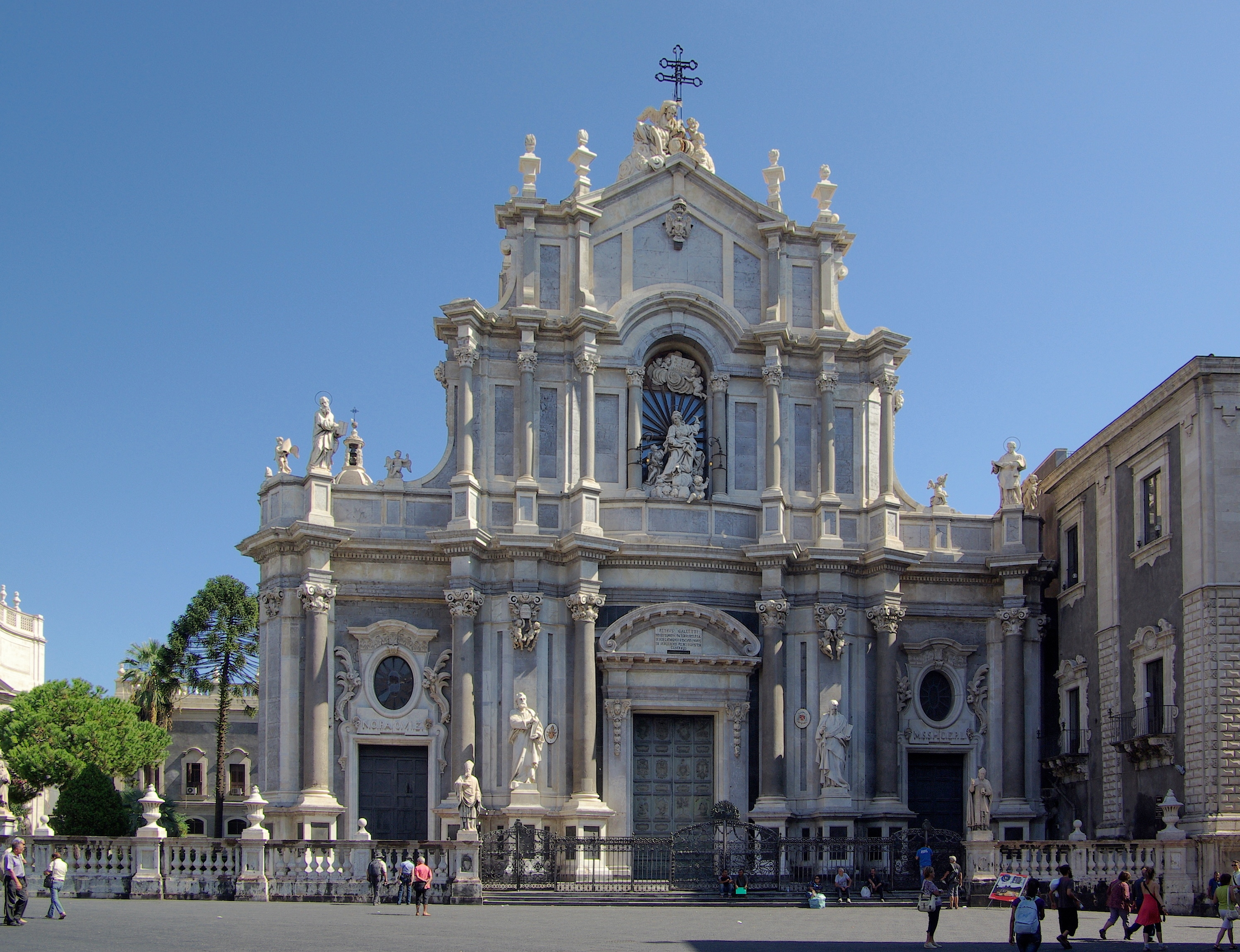
- Cathedral in Catania

Location
- Country: Italy
- Ecclesiastical province: Catania
- Coordinates: 37.502809°N 15.088604°E

Statistics
- Area: 1,332 km^{2} (514 sq mi)
- Population: Total; Catholics: (as of 2023); 721,900 ▼ (est.); 715,900 (est.) ▼
- Parishes: 157

Information
- Denomination: Catholic Church
- Rite: Roman Rite
- Established: unknown 1859 (Archdiocese)
- Cathedral: Basilica Cattedrale di S. Agata
- Secular priests: 218 (diocesan) ▼101 (Religious Orders) ▼66 Deacons ▲

Current leadership
- Pope: Leo XIV
- Archbishop: Luigi Renna
- Bishops emeritus: Salvatore Gristina

Map
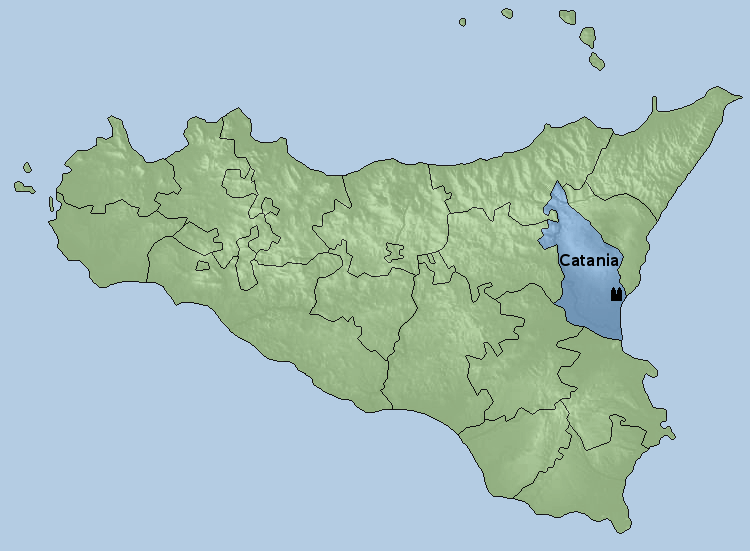

Website
- www.diocesi.catania.it

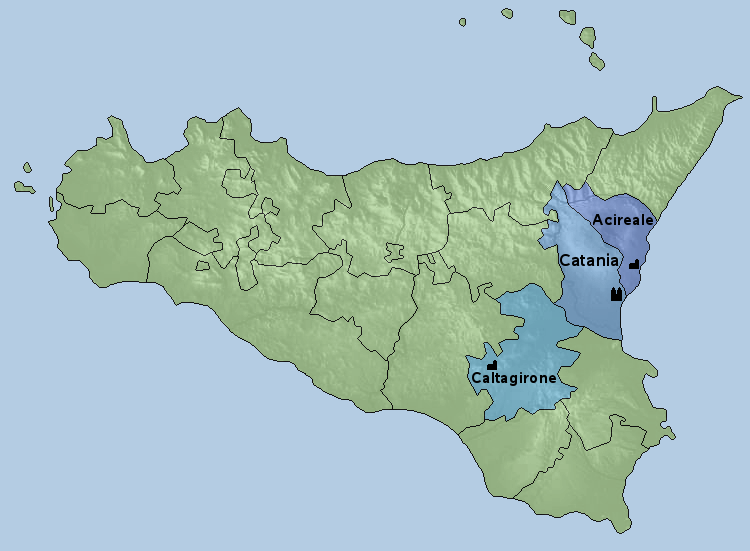
Province of Catania

The Archdiocese of Catania (Latin: Archidioecesis Catanensis) is a Latin Church diocese of the Catholic Church in Sicily, southern Italy, with its seat in Catania. It was elevated to an archdiocese in 1859, and became a metropolitan see in 2000. Its suffragans are the diocese of Acireale and the diocese of Caltagirone.

== Historical notes ==
According to legend, Christianity was first preached in Catania by St. Beryllus. During the persecution of Decius the virgin St. Agatha suffered martyrdom. At the same period or a little later the Bishop of Catania was Everus, who is mentioned in the acts of the martyrs of Leontini (303). The Deacon Euplius and others were martyred in the same year.

=== Earliest bishops ===
It is said that a Domninus (or Domnicius) was Bishop of Catania and was present at the Council of Ephesus (431); the Acts of the council, however, show that he was bishop of Coliaeum (Cotyaeum, Cotyaion) in Phrygia, not bishop of Catania.

A genuine bishop of Catania, Fortunatus, was twice sent (514, 516) with Bishop Ennodius of Pavia by Pope Hormisdas to Emperor Anastasius I to effect the union of the Eastern Churches with Rome. Bishop Leo appears in the correspondence of Pope Gregory I (590–604). In 730 Bishop James suffered martyrdom for his defence of images. In c. 750, Sabino was Bishop of Catania. His successor, Leo (II) of Catania, was known as a wonder-worker (thaumaturgus).

In the 8th century, The Emperor Leo III the Isaurian (717–741) removed all the dioceses of Sicily from papal control, and made them suffragans of the Ecumenical Patriarchate of Constantinople. In the Descriptio orbis Romani of George of Cyprus, Catania is listed as a suffragan of Syracuse, the only metropolitan in Sicily.

Bishop Euthymius was at first an adherent of the Patriarch Photius, but in the Eighth General Council approved the restoration of Ignatius as patriarch. John of Ajello, who died in the 1169 Sicily earthquake, won a contested episcopal election against William of Blois in 1167.

=== Under the Arabs and the Normans ===
From c. 827 to 1071 Catania was subject to the Arab (Saracen) occupation of the island of Sicily. In late summer 1071, Robert Guiscard and Roger d'Hauteville captured Catania. The Norman conquest of Sicily under the auspicies of the Papacy meant that the revival of Christianity was tied to the Latin rite, and, without a Greek metropolitan on the island, newly appointed bishops looked to Rome for validation and consecration. It was not until 1130 that a Latin metropolitan was appointed in Palermo, and 1131 in Messina. On 27 September 1130, Pope Anacletus II, at the request of King Roger II, granted the archbishop of Palermo the right to consecrate the bishops of Syracuse, Agrigento, and Catania. When Messina was named an archdiocese, again at the request of King Roger II, Catania, Lipari and Caphalonia were appointed suffragans of Messina.

On 9 March 1092 (1091 old style), Pope Urban II granted the privilege to Abbot-Bishop Ansger of Catania that whowever was elected abbot of the monastery of Saint Agatha would also be bishop of Catania.

A mahor earthquake struck eastern Sicily on 4 February 1169, followed by the collapse of the cone of the Mount Etna volcano. Catania was completely destroyed, with a loss of life of some 15,000 persons, including the Bishop of Catania, Ioannes de Agello.

Pope Lucius III elevated the diocese of Monreale to the rank of metropolitan archbishop on 5 February 1183, in the bull "Licet Dominus Jesus." The dioceses of Catania and Syracuse were made suffragans. Catania was deprived of the right to the pallium.

On 7 July 1274 Pope Gregory X wrote to the Bishop of Syracuse that he had received information that the Bishop of Catania (Angelo Boccamazza), along with his cousin Bartolomeo Romano and two nephews, had attacked a Franciscan convent at Castro Orsino and destroyed its buildings; the Bishop of Syracuse was ordered to investigate, and if the charges were true, he was to excommunicate the offending parties.

In 1409 a severe earthquake reduced the monastery of San Niccolò l'Arena to ruins.

=== Volcano and earthquakes ===
On 11 March 1669 a major fissure opened up on the southeast side of Mt. Etna, some ten miles from Catania, and sent lava in the direction of the city. The stream passed along the walls of the city and reached the sea, but at the beginning of May fresh supplies of lava overtopped the walls of Catania and destroyed the monastery of the Benedictines. The vineyards of the Jesuits, who staffed a college in Catania, were also destroyed. By mid-May three quarters of Catania was surrounded by lava, and several streams entered the city. Fourteen towns and villages between the volcano and Catania were obliterated, leaving only the tower of a ruined church visible.

On 9 January 1693 a major earthquake destroyed the city of Catania and killed eighteen thousand people. Only a part of the cathedral and one house survived. Another earthquake struck the ruins of Catania at the end of September 1693.

From 1679 to 1818, the bishop of Catania was the Great Chancellor of the University of Catania. The University had been founded in 1444 by King Alfonso I of Sicily, and was under the administration of the Senate of Catania, with the supervision of the Viceroy of Sicily. In 1556 the Jesuits established a secondary school ('college') in Catania.

In 1859 the diocese of Catania was made an archiepiscopal see, immediately subject to the Holy See.

=== Canons and cathedral ===
Bishop Bellomi (1450–1472) petitioned Pope Nicholas V that the Cathedral Chapter of Catania should include the dignities of the Archdeacon, Prior, Cantor, the Dean, and the Treasurer. Papal permission was granted on 12 June 1453. There were twelve primary Canons and twelve secondary Canons. Pope Pius V (1566–1572) abolished the dignity of Archdeacon. Originally the Canons were all members of a monastic community and followed the Rule of St. Benedict (hence the office of Prior), but Bishop Vincenzo Cutelli (1577-1589) obtained permission from Pope Gregory XIII on 9 February 1578 to convert the Chapter into a corporation of secular priests. Bishop Ottavio Branciforte (1638-1646) revived the dignity of Archdeacon in April 1639, and appointed his brother Luigi Branciforte, Doctor in utroque iure (Civil and Canon Law) to the dignity.

=== Minor basilicas ===
On 14 July 1926, the cathedral of Saint Agatha, which was about to celebrate the eighth centenary of the return of the remains of Saint Agatha from Constantinople, was granted the title and honors of a minor basilica.

In observance of the 5th centenary of the establishment at the church of Santa Maria dell'Elemosina in Catania as a collegiate church, and to promote the cult of the Virgin Mary, on 31 March 1946 Pope Pius XII granted the collegiate church the title and honors of a minor basilica.

The church of Santa Maria dell'Elemosina in the town of Biancavilla (diocese of Catania) was granted the title and honors of a minor basilica on 14 March 1970 by Pope Paul VI.

At the request of Archbishop Domenico Picchinenna (1974–1988), Pope John Paul II granted the title and honors of a minor basilica to the church of Maria Santissima Annunziata al Carmine in Catania on 7 November 1987.

On 16 April 1996, at the petition of Archbishop Luigi Bommarito (1988–2002), Pope John Paul II granted the church of Saint Catherine of Alexandria in Pedara (diocese of Catania) the title and honors of a minor basilica.

=== Diocesan reorganization ===
On 4 September 1859, the diocese of Catania was elevated to the status of an archdiocese by Pope Pius IX. Bishop Felice Regano (1839–1861) was granted the pallium in the papal consistory of 26 September 1859. It had no suffragans, but its archbishop took precedence over bishops in assmblies of prelates.

The diocese of Catania had been an archdiocese for nearly a century and a half. Population movements, changes in occupations, and reorganization of civil districts and boundaries since world war II, made it desirable to carry out adjustments in the ecclesiastical structures of Sicily. After extensive consultations, on 2 December 2000, Pope John Paul II ordered a new arrangement of the dioceses of Sicily. The archdiocese of Catania was promoted to the status of a mentroplitan archdiocese, and assigned as suffragans the diocese of Acireale, formerly directly subject to the Papacy, and the diocese of Caltagirone, formerly a suffragan of the archdiocese of Syracuse.

== List of bishops and archbishops ==
The traditional list and chronology of early bishops may have a lack of evidence.

=== Bishops ===
==== to 1000 ====
- [ Birillus ]
- [ Attalus ]
- [ Everus (Severus ?) ]
- Serapion (4th century)
- [ Severinus ]
- Fortunatus (attested 514–516)
- Elpidius (attested 558–560)
- Leo I (attested 591–604)
- Magnus (6th–7th century)
- John (7th century)
- Constantine I (7th century)
- George (attested 679)
- Julian (attested 680)
- Saint James the Confessor (attested 730)
- Saint Sabinus
- Saint Leo II the Wonderworker (765–789)
- Theodore I (attested 787)
- Saint Severus (802–814)
- Euthymius (869–870)
- Theodore II † (9th century)
- Constantine II † (9th century)
- Anthony (9th century)
- Leo III (attested 997)

==== 1000 to 1500 ====
- ...
- Ansgar (1091–1124)
- Mauritius (1124–1144)
- Julian (1144–1156)
- Bernard (1156–1158)
- vacant (1158–1167)
- John of Ajello (1167–1169)
- Robert (1170–1179)
- Symon (1189–1191)
- Leo IV (attested 1194)
- Roger Orbus (1195–1206)
- Walter of Palearia (1208–1229)
- Heinrich von Bilversheim (1231–1232)
- vacant (1232–1254)
- Oddo Capucci (1254–1256)
- Angelo de Abrusca (1257–1272)
- Angelo Boccamazza (1272–1296)
- Gentile Stefaneschi Orsini (1296–1303)
- Leonardo Fieschi (1304–1331)
- Nicholas de Ceccano (1332–1337)
- Nicholas de Grelis (1339–1342)
- Gerald Othonis (1342–1347)
- Peter
- Juan de Luna (1348–1355)
- Martialis (1355–1375)
- Élie de Vaudron (1376–1378)
- Simone del Pozzo (1378–1396)
- Contended due to the Western Schism (1396–1418)
  For the Avignon Obedience were elected: Pedro Serra (1396–1397) by Antipope Benedict XIII and then Robert (1398–1404).
  For the Pisan Obedience were elected: Mauro Cali, O.S.B. (1408–1411); Cali had been Bishop of Malta (1393–1408). He was nominated bishop of Catania by King Martin, and approved by Pope Alexander V, who had been elected by the cardinals at the Council of Pisa. Lombardo states that Cali was removed on orders of Queen Maria because he favored the party of Count Caprera her enemy.
- Jean de Puinoix (1418–1431)
- Giovanni Pesce (1431–1447)
- Cardinal Giovanni de Primis (1447–1449)
- Arias d'Avalos (1449–1450)
- Guglielmo Bellomo (1450–1472)
- Cardinal Giuliano della Rovere (1473–1474)
- Giovanni Gatto (1475–1479)
- Bernardo Margarit (1479–1486)
- Alfonso Carrillo de Albornoz (1486–1496)
- Juan de Aza (1496–1498)
- Cardinal Francisco des Prats (1498–1500)

==== 1500 to 1861 ====
- Diego Ramírez de Guzmán (1500–1508)
- Jaime de Conchillos (1509–1512)
- Gaspar Ponz (1513–1520)
- Cardinal Matthäus Schiner (1520–1522)
- Cardinal Pompeo Colonna (1523–1524)
- Cardinal Marino Ascanio Caracciolo (1524)
- Scipione Caracciolo (1524–1529)
- Cardinal Marino Ascanio Caracciolo (1529–1530)
- Luigi Caracciolo (1530–1536)
- Cardinal Marino Ascanio Caracciolo (1536–1537)
- Nicola Maria Caracciolo (1537–1567)
- Antonino Faraone (1569–1572)
- Juan Orozco de Arce (1574–1576)
- Vincenzo Cutelli (1577–1589)
- Juan Corrionero (1589–1592)
- Prospero Rebiba (1592–1593)
- Giovanni Domenico Rebiba (1595–1604)
- Giovanni Ruiz de Villoslada (1605–1609)
- Bonaventura Secusio (1609–1618)
- Juan Torres de Osorio (1619–1624)
- Innocenzo Massimo (1624–1633)
- Ottavio Branciforte (1638 –1646)
- Marco Antonio Gussio (1650–1660)
- Cardinal Camillo Astalli Pamphilj (1661–1663)
- Michelangelo Bonadies (1665–1686)
- Francesco Antonio Carafa (1687–1692)
- Andrea Reggio (1693–1717)
- Cardinal Juan Álvaro Cienfuegos Villazón (1721–1725)
- Alessandro Burgos (1726)
- Raimundo Rubí y Boxadors (1727–1729)
- Pietro Galletti de Gregorio (1729–1757)
- Salvatore Ventimiglia Statella (1757–1771)
- Corrado Maria Deodato Moncada (1773–1813)
- Gabriele Maria Gravina di Montevago (1816–1817)
- Salvatore Ferro de Berardis (1818–1819)
- Domenico Orlando (1823–1839)
- Felice Regano (1839–1861)

=== Archbishops ===
==== Since 1861 ====
- vacant (1861–1867)
- Blessed Cardinal Giuseppe Benedetto du Smet (February 22, 1867 – April 4, 1894)
- Cardinal Giuseppe Francica Nava de Bondifè (March 18, 1895 – December 7, 1928)
- Emilio Ferrais (December 7, 1928 – January 23, 1930)
- Carmelo Patané (July 7, 1930 – April 3, 1952)
- Guido Luigi Bentivoglio (April 3, 1952 – July 16 1974)
- Domenico Picchinenna (July 16 1974 – June 1, 1988)
- Luigi Bommarito (June 1, 1988 – June 7, 2002)
- Salvatore Gristina (June 7, 2002 – January 8, 2022)
- Luigi Renna (January 8, 2022 – present)

=== Other affiliated bishops ===
==== Coadjutor archbishops ====
- Emilio Ferrais (1925-1928)
- Guido Luigi Bentivoglio, O. Cist. (1949-1952)
- Domenico Picchinenna (1971-1974)

==== Auxiliary bishops ====
- Antonio Maria Trigona (1806-1817)
- Francesco di Paola Berretta (1828-?)
- Giovanni Fortunato Paternò (1823-1834)
- Pietro Gravina Luzzena (1836-1855)
- Antonio Caff (1882-1895)
- Emilio Ferrais (1911-1925), appointed Coadjutor here
- Pio Vittorio Vigo (1981-1985), appointed Bishop of Nicosia

== Suffragan sees ==
- Acireale (since 2000)
- Caltagirone (since 2000)

== Books ==
=== Reference Works ===
- Eubel, Conradus (1913). Hierarchia catholica, Tomus 1 (second ed.). Münster: Libreria Regensbergiana. (in Latin)
- Eubel, Conradus (1914). Hierarchia catholica, Tomus 2 (second ed.). Münster: Libreria Regensbergiana. (in Latin)
- Eubel, Conradus (1923). Hierarchia catholica, Tomus 3 (second ed.). Münster: Libreria Regensbergiana. (in Latin)
- Gams, Pius Bonifatius (1873). Series episcoporum Ecclesiae catholicae: quotquot innotuerunt a beato Petro apostolo. Ratisbon: Typis et Sumptibus Georgii Josephi Manz. pp. 946–947. (Use with caution; obsolete)
- Gauchat, Patritius (Patrice) (1935). Hierarchia catholica IV (1592-1667). Münster: Libraria Regensbergiana. (in Latin)
- Ritzler, Remigius; Sefrin, Pirminus (1952). Hierarchia catholica medii et recentis aevi V (1667-1730). Patavii: Messagero di S. Antonio. (in Latin)
- Ritzler, Remigius; Sefrin, Pirminus (1958). Hierarchia catholica medii et recentis aevi VI (1730-1799). Patavii: Messagero di S. Antonio. (in Latin)
- Ritzler, Remigius; Sefrin, Pirminus (1968). Hierarchia Catholica medii et recentioris aevi sive summorum pontificum, S. R. E. cardinalium, ecclesiarum antistitum series... A pontificatu Pii PP. VII (1800) usque ad pontificatum Gregorii PP. XVI (1846) (in Latin). Vol. VII. Monasterii: Libr. Regensburgiana.
- Ritzler, Remigius; Pirminus Sefrin (1978). Hierarchia catholica Medii et recentioris aevi... A Pontificatu PII PP. IX (1846) usque ad Pontificatum Leonis PP. XIII (1903) (in Latin). Vol. VIII. Il Messaggero di S. Antonio.
- Pięta, Zenon (2002). Hierarchia catholica medii et recentioris aevi... A pontificatu Pii PP. X (1903) usque ad pontificatum Benedictii PP. XV (1922) (in Latin). Vol. IX. Padua: Messagero di San Antonio. ISBN 978-88-250-1000-8.

=== Studies ===
- Benigni, Ugo. (1913). "Catania, Archdiocese of (Catanensis)," in: The Catholic Encyclopedia vol. 3 (New York: Encyclopedia Press 1913), pp. 429-430. [derived from Cappelletti; there is a new edition]
- Catalano, Μichele (1917). "La fondazione e le prime vicende del Collegio dei Gesuiti in Catania (1556–1579), (in Italian), in: Archivio storico per la Sicilia orientale Vol. 14 (Catania 1917), pp.145-186.
- Clarenza, Vincenzo Cordaro (1833). Osservazioni sopra la storia di Catania: cavate dalla storia generale di Sicilia. (in Italian). Catania: Salvatore Riggio, Vol. 1 (1835). Vol. 2 (1833). Vol. 4: 1700–1830 (1834).
- Cappelletti, Giuseppe (1870). Le chiese d'Italia dalla loro origine sino ai nostri giorni (in Italian). Vol. vigesimoprimo (21). Venezia: Antonelli. pp. 633–642.
- D'Avino, Vincenzio (1848). Cenni storici sulle chiese arcivescovili, vescovili, e prelatizie (nullius) del regno delle due Sicilie (in Italian). Naples: dalle stampe di Ranucci. pp. 173–182. (article by Canon Gaetano Lombardo)
- Ferrara, Francesco (1829). Storia di Catania (in Italian) (Catania: Lorenzo Dato 1829).
- Lanzoni, Francesco (1927). Le diocesi d'Italia dalle origini al principio del secolo VII (an. 604) (in Italian). Rome: Biblioteca Apostolica Vaticana.
- Backman, Clifford R. (2002). The Decline and Fall of Medieval Sicily: Politics, Religion, and Economy in the Reign of Frederick III, 1296-1337. Cambridge University Press. ISBN 978-0-521-52181-9.
- Kamp, Norbert (1975). Kirche und Monarchie im staufischen Königreich Sizilien: I. Prosopographische Grundlegung, Bistumer und Bischofe des Konigreichs 1194–1266: 3. Sizilien München: Wilhelm Fink 1975, pp. .
- Kehr, Paul Fridolin (1975). Regesta Pontificum Romanorum. (in Latin). Vol. X: Calabria–Insulae. Turici: Weidmann 1975. (pp. 283-297).
- Pirro, Rocco (1733). Mongitore, Antonino (ed.). Sicilia sacra disquisitionibus et notitiis illustrata. Vol. Tomus primus (third ed.). Palermo: haeredes P. Coppulae.
