= William of Blois =

William of Blois or William de Blois may refer to:

- William, Count of Blois (c.772–834), count of Blois from 830 to 34
- William, Count of Sully (c.1085–c.1150), count of Blois from 1102 to 1107, brother of King Stephen of England
- William I, Count of Boulogne (c.1137–1159), count of Boulogne from 1153 to 1159, son of King Stephen of England
- William of Blois (poet) (fl.1167), abbot of Maniaci, sometimes confused with the bishop of Lincoln
- William de Blois (bishop of Lincoln), in office from 1203 to 1206, probably related to the bishop of Worcester
- William de Blois (bishop of Worcester), in office from 1218 to 1236, probably related to the bishop of Lincoln
