= John of Ajello =

John of Ajello (died 4 February 1169) was the Bishop of Catania from November 1167 until his death. He was a brother of the chancellor Matthew of Ajello.

Since the death of the last incumbent 1162 the see of Catania had been vacant. In 1167 an election was disputed between William of Blois, one of the French party that had come to Sicily in the following of the chancellor Stephen du Perche, and John, who had the support of the "xenophobe party" opposed to the French. John's election was confirmed by November, when the chronicler Hugo Falcandus referred to him as "electus" when implicated him in the poisoning of Robert of Bellême. John's election was confirmed by Pope Alexander III on 26 July 1168.

John died in the earthquake of 4 February 1169. In a letter to William, his brother, the poet Peter of Blois, praised John's death as fitting punishment from God.

== See also ==
- Catholic Church in Italy

== Sources ==
- Panarelli, Francesco (2008). "Matteo d'Aiello (D'Aiello; Matteo da Salerno, Matteo notaio)". Dizionario Biografico degli Italiani. Vol. 72.
- White, Lynn (1935). "For the Biography of William of Blois". The English Historical Review. 50 (199): 487–90. doi:10.1093/ehr/l.cxcix.487.
