= 1169 Sicily earthquake =

- Location within Sicily
- Local date: 4 February 1169
- Local time: 08:00
- Magnitude: 7.3 M_{s}
- Epicenter: 37.217°N 14.95°E
- Areas affected: Eastern Sicily
- Max. intensity: MMI X (Extreme)
- Tsunami: Yes
- Casualties: 15,000–25,000 deaths

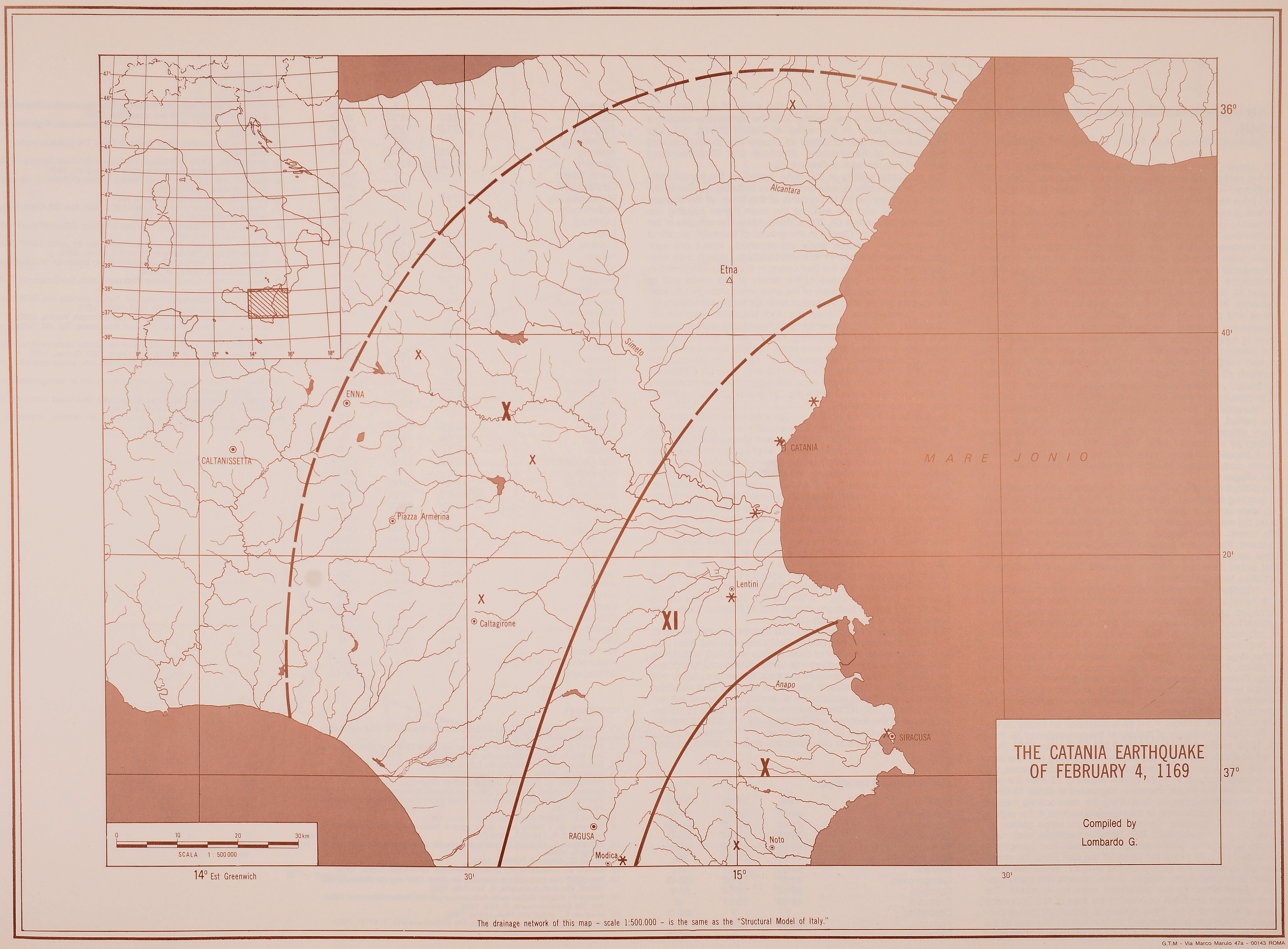
Isoseismal map of the earthquake

The 1169 Sicily earthquake occurred on 4 February 1169 at 08:00 local time on the eve of the feast of St. Agatha of Sicily (in southern Italy). It had an estimated magnitude of between 6.4 and 7.3 and an estimated maximum perceived intensity of X (Extreme) on the Mercalli intensity scale. The cities of Catania, Lentini and Modica were severely damaged, and the earthquake also triggered a paleotsunami. Overall, the earthquake is estimated to have caused the deaths of at least 15,000 people.

== Tectonic setting ==
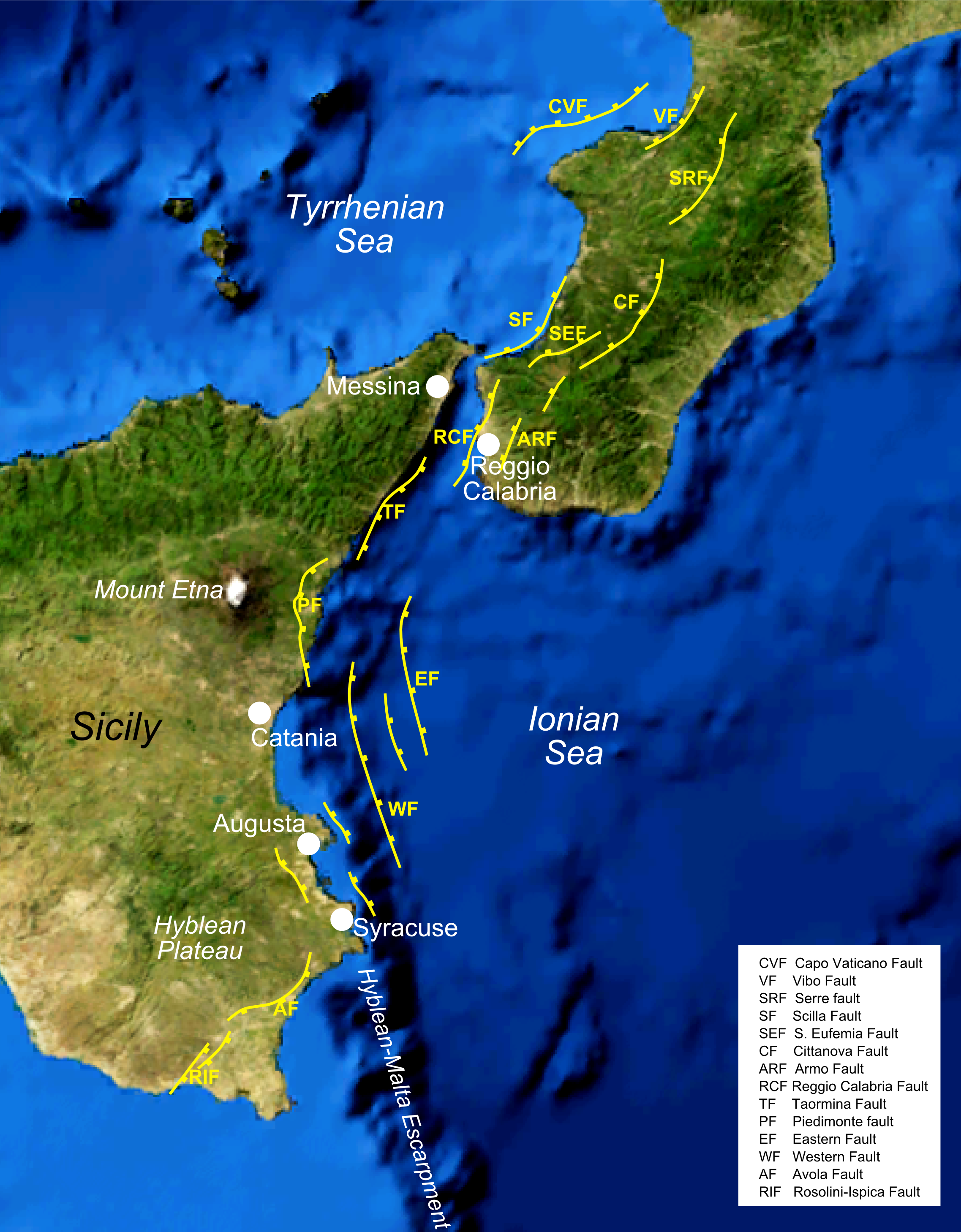
Main faults of the Siculo-Calabrian rift zone

Sicily lies on part of the complex convergent boundary where the African plate is subducting beneath the Eurasian plate. This subduction zone is responsible for the formation of the stratovolcano Mount Etna. Most of the damaging earthquakes occur on the Siculo-Calabrian rift zone, a zone of extensional faulting which runs for about 370 kilometres (230 mi), forming three main segments through Calabria, along the east coast of Sicily and immediately offshore, and finally forming the southeastern margin of the Hyblean Plateau, a carbonate platform in southeastern Sicily. Faults in the Calabrian segment were responsible for the 1783 Calabrian earthquakes sequence.

In the southern part of the eastern coast of Sicily, investigations have identified a series of active normal dip-slip faults, dipping to the east. Most of these lie offshore, and some control basins that contain large thicknesses of Quaternary sediments. The two largest faults, known as the western and eastern master faults, border half-grabens, with fill of up to 700 metres (2,297 ft) and 800 metres (2,625 ft) respectively. Onshore, two ages of faulting have been recognised, an earlier phase trending NW-SE and a later phase trending SSW-NNE that clearly offsets the first group, including the Avola fault and the Rosolini-Ispica fault system.

== Earthquake ==
The location of the earthquake's epicentre is quite uncertain, with different seismologists giving locations offshore and onshore; there is similar uncertainty regarding the 1693 Sicily earthquake. The damaged area is similar to that for the 1693 earthquake, suggesting that both the location and magnitude were similar. Intensities of X (Extreme) have been estimated for Catania, Lentini and Modica, IX (Violent) at Syracuse and Piazza Armerina and VIII (Severe) at Santi Pietro e Paolo and Messina. The earthquake was also felt in Calabria with a maximum intensity of VI (Strong) in Reggio Calabria.

The magnitude of the earthquake has been estimated from intensity information and these estimates vary from 6.4 on the M_{e} (Equivalent magnitude scale) to 7.3 on the surface-wave magnitude scale.

== Tsunami ==
The tsunami affected most of the Ionian coast of Sicily and caused inundation from Messina in the north to the mouth of the Simeto River in the south.

Tsunami deposits correlated with this earthquake have been found both onshore and offshore. The tsunami is also thought to be responsible for moving several large boulders from the middle of the sublittoral zone onto the coast between Augusta and Syracuse.

== Eruption of Etna ==
Some accounts of this earthquake refer to a major eruption from Etna at the time of the earthquake, blaming most of the deaths in Catania and the tsunami on the eruption. However, most later workers believe the tsunami was triggered by the earthquake and that the only effect on Etna was the collapse of part of the cone above Taormina, with no significant eruption. As with the 1693 earthquake the 1169 event seems to have followed after a major period of eruptive activity. Calculations have shown that a major eruption may significantly increase the stress on the normal faults to the south-east of the volcano.

== Damage ==
Catania was almost completely destroyed. Catania Cathedral collapsed, killing the Bishop John of Ajello, 44 of the Benedictine monks, and many others who were crowded into the building for the feast of St. Agatha. Lentini, Modica, Aci Castello, Sortino and Syracuse were also severely damaged.

In a contemporary account, Hugo Falcandus described the effects on the Arethusa spring in Syracuse, which increased its rate of flow greatly and became salty. Near Casale Saraceno the flow of another spring, known as Tais, stopped after the earthquake. Two hours later it returned with much greater force than before and had the colour of blood.

Estimates of the death toll in the earthquake vary, with 15,000 being often quoted, sometimes for the overall total and sometimes just for Catania. A few sources give the higher estimate of 25,000.

== Aftermath ==
In the chaos that followed the earthquake, there was concern that exiles like Tancred of Lecce and Robert of Loritello would take part in a Byzantine invasion of the island. However, these disaffected exiles were soon allowed to return and there was no invasion, nor the rebellion that it might have triggered.

Peter of Blois saw the earthquake as God's punishment on the Sicilians for the exile of Stephen du Perche and the appointment of Bishop John of Ajello, through bribery, to the see of Catania, replacing his brother William of Blois in the post.

== See also ==
- List of earthquakes in Italy
- List of historical earthquakes
- List of tsunamis
