= Catania Cathedral =

Cathedral in Catania, Sicily, Italy

Metropolitan Cathedral of Saint Agatha Cattedrale metropolitana di Sant'Agata
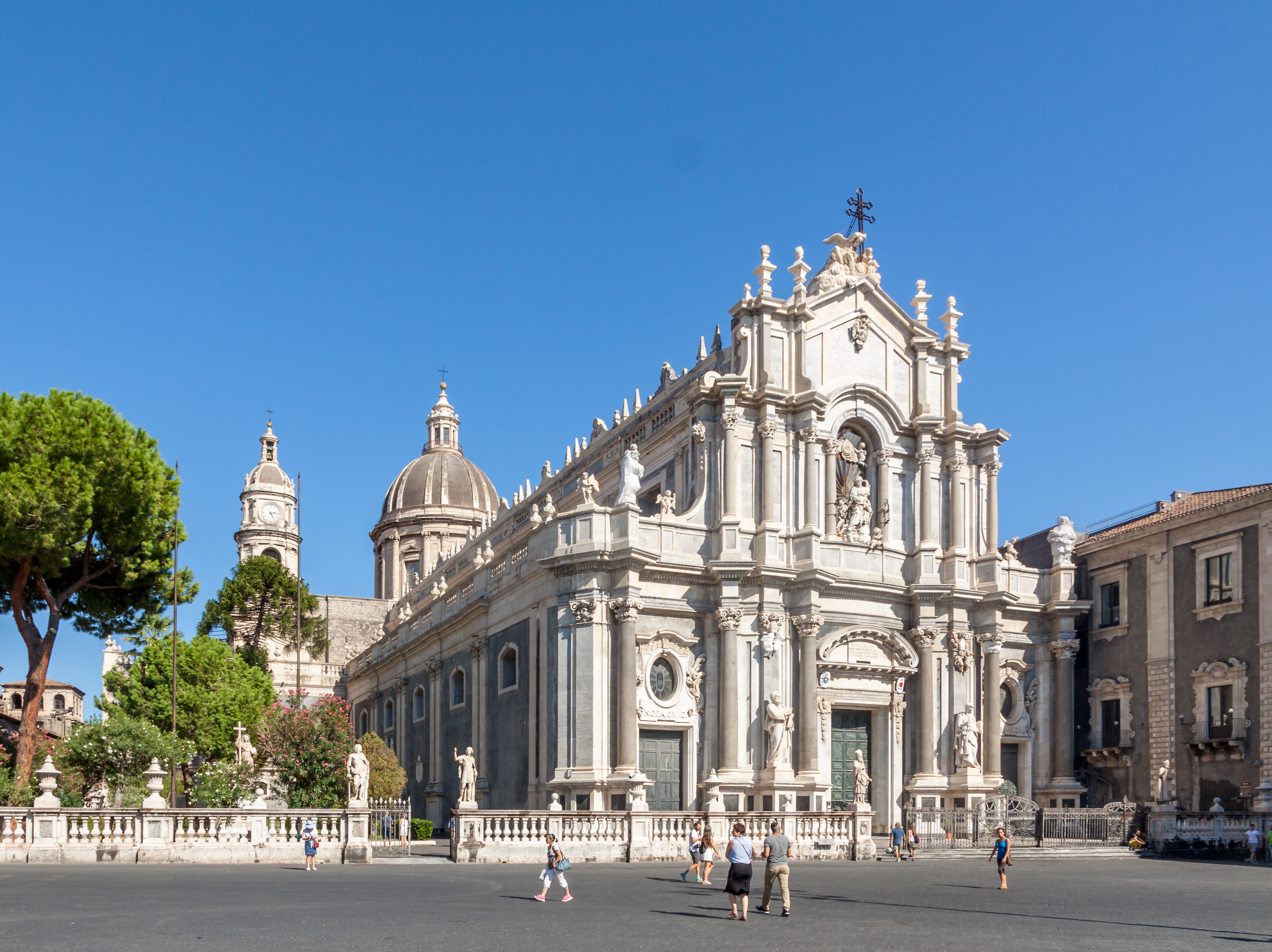
- Catania Cathedral

Religion
- Affiliation: Roman Catholic
- Diocese: Archdiocese of Catania
- Rite: Roman
- Ecclesiastical or organisational status: Cathedral

Location
- Location: Catania, Italy
- Interactive map of Metropolitan Cathedral of Saint Agatha; Cattedrale metropolitana di Sant'Agata
- Coordinates: 37°30′09″N 15°05′17″E

Architecture
- Type: Church
- Style: Norman and Baroque

The Metropolitan Cathedral of Saint Agatha (Italian: Cattedrale metropolitana di Sant'Agata), usually known as the Catania Cathedral (Italian: Duomo di Catania), is a Roman Catholic cathedral in Catania, Sicily, southern Italy. It was the seat of the Bishops of Catania until 1859, when the diocese was elevated to an archdiocese, and since then has been the seat of the Archbishops of Catania.

== History ==
The cathedral has been destroyed and rebuilt several times because of earthquakes and eruptions of the nearby Mount Etna. It was originally constructed in 1078–1093, on the ruins of the ancient Roman Achillean Baths, by order of Roger I of Sicily, who had conquered the city from the Islamic emirate of Sicily. At the time it had the appearance of a fortified church (ecclesia munita).

In 1169 it was almost entirely destroyed by an earthquake, leaving only the apse area intact. Further damage was caused by a fire in 1169, but the most catastrophic event was the 1693 earthquake, which again left it mostly in ruins. It was subsequently rebuilt in Baroque style.

Today, traces of the original Norman edifice include part of the transept, the two towers and the three semicircular apses, composed of large lava stones, most of them recovered from imperial Roman buildings.

== Exterior ==
The current appearance of the cathedral dates from the work in 1711 of Gian Battista Vaccarini, who designed a new Baroque façade after the 1693 earthquake. It has three levels with Corinthian columns in granite, perhaps taken from the Roman Theatre of the city. All the orders are decorated with marble statues of Saint Agatha over the gate, Saint Euplius on the right and Saint Birillus on the left. The main door, in wood, has 32 sculpted plaques with episodes of the life and martyrdom of Saint Agatha, papal coats of arms and symbols of Christianity.

The dome dates from 1802. The bell tower was originally erected in 1387, with a height of some 70 meters. In 1662 a clock was added, the structure reaching 90 meters. After the destruction of 1693 it was rebuilt, with the addition of a 7.5 t bell, the third largest in Italy after those in St. Peter's Basilica and in Milan Cathedral.

The parvise is accessed through a marble façade culminating in a wrought iron .... decorated with 10 bronze statues of saints. The parvise is separated from the cathedral square by a balustrade in white stone, featuring five large statues of saints by Carlo Nicoli in Carrara marble.

== Interior ==
The cathedral has a Latin cross groundplan, with a nave and two aisles. In the southern aisle are the baptistery and, at the first altar, a canvas of Saint Febronia of Nisibis by Borremans facing, on a pilaster, the tomb of the composer Vincenzo Bellini. Also on a pilaster between this aisle and the nave is the Baroque monument of Bishop Pietro Galletti. Also notable is the Chapel of St. Agatha.

The apse dates back to the original 12th-century construction: it features a medieval mullioned window and a late-16th-century choir by the Neapolitan artist Scipione di Guido. At the end of the north transept is the Chapel of the Holy Crucifix, by Domenico Mazzola (1577). It houses the tombs of members of the Aragonese branch of Sicily, including Kings Frederick III and Louis, John of Randazzo, and Constance.

The northern aisle has several 17th-century paintings of saints, including one by Guglielmo Borremans.

== See also ==
- 18th-century Western domes

== Gallery ==
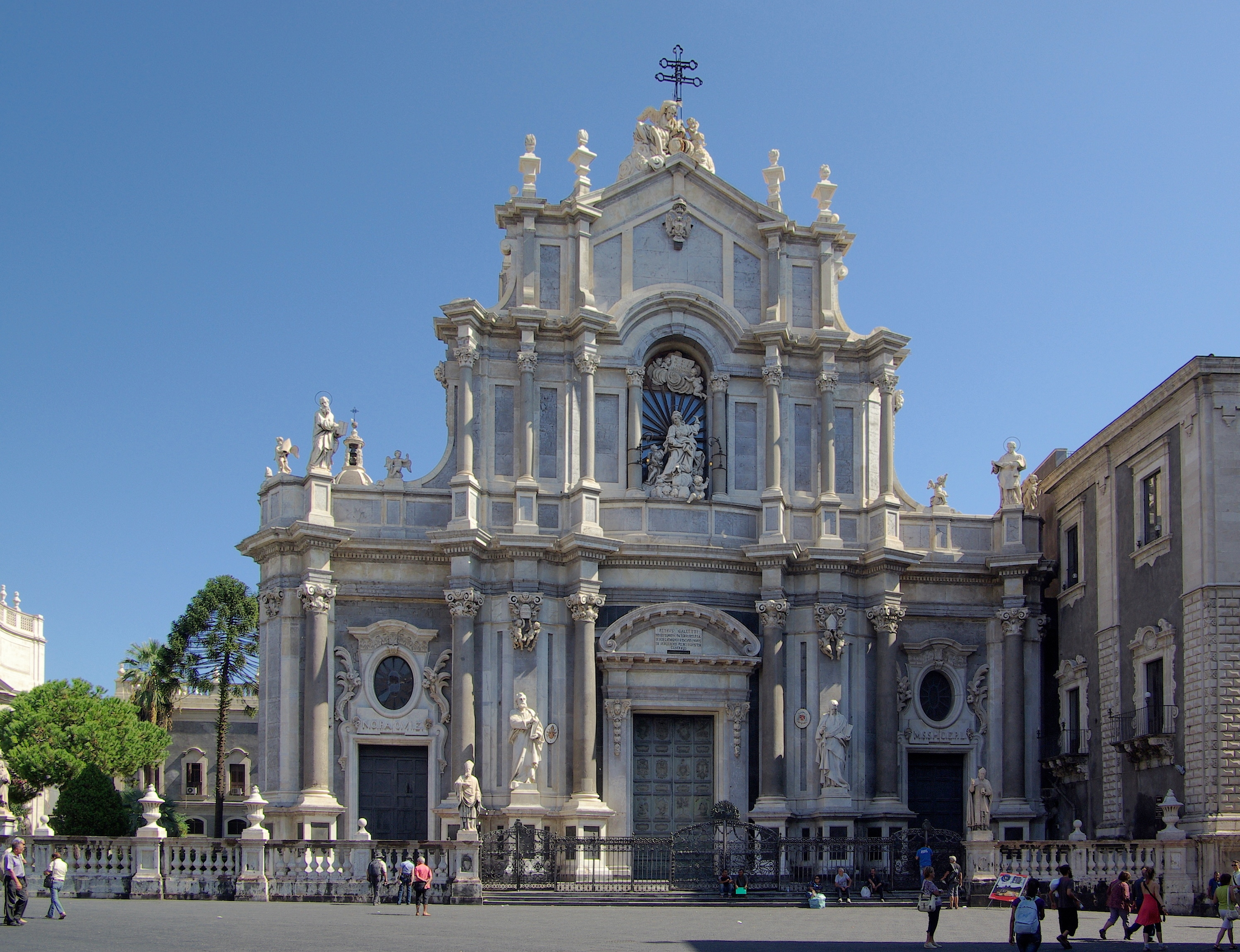
The façade

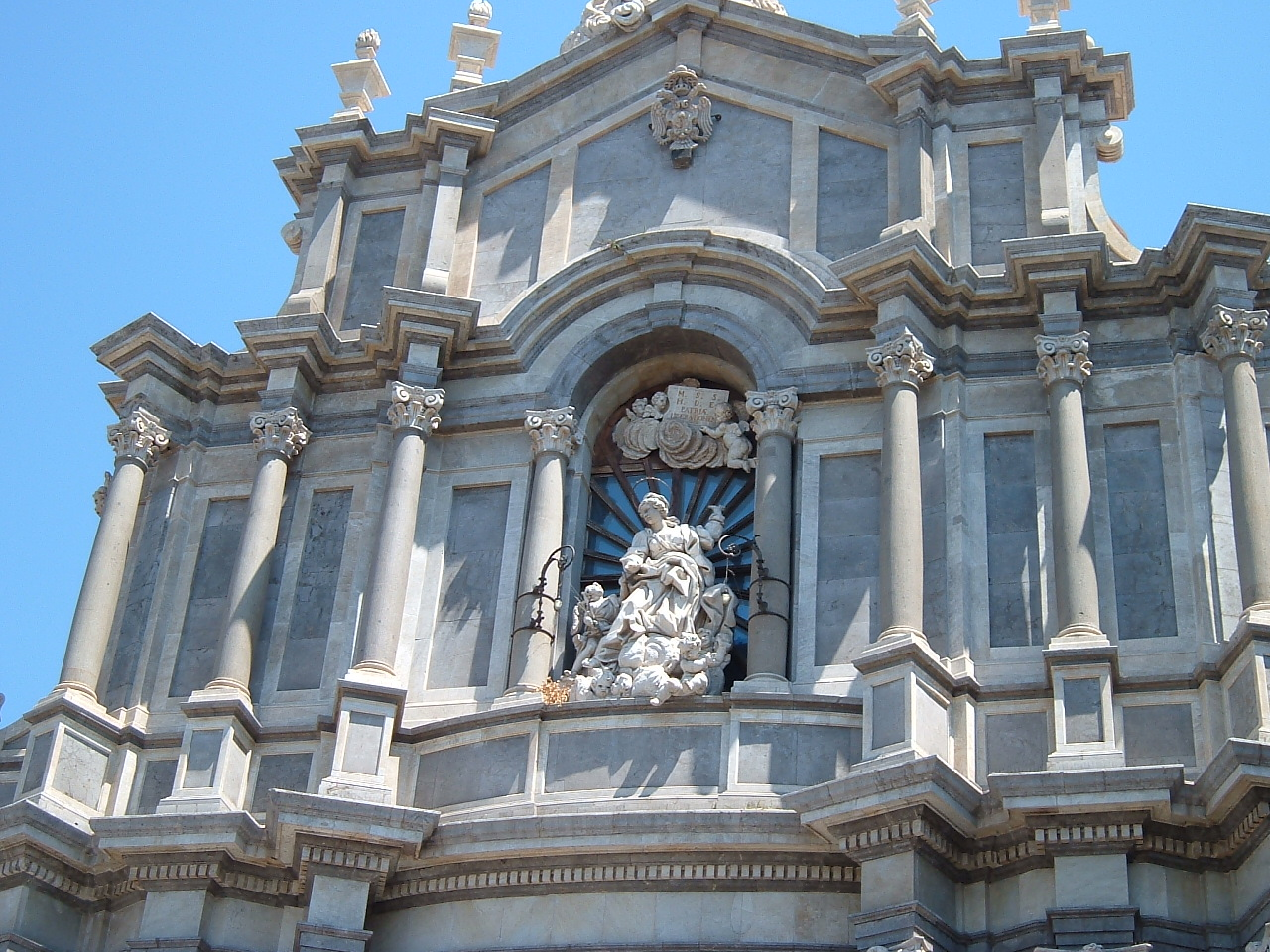
Closeup of the façade with statue of Saint Agatha

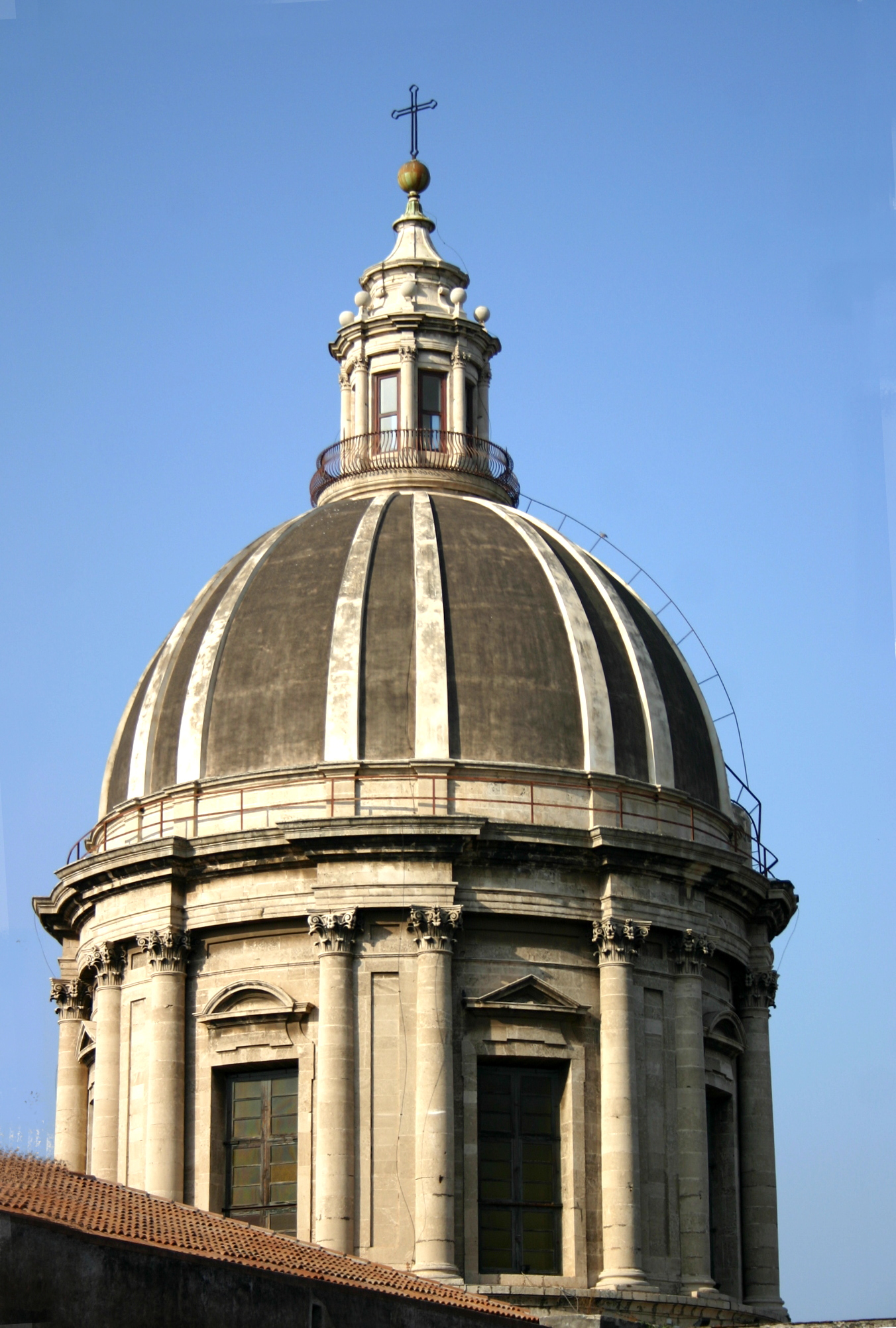
The cupola

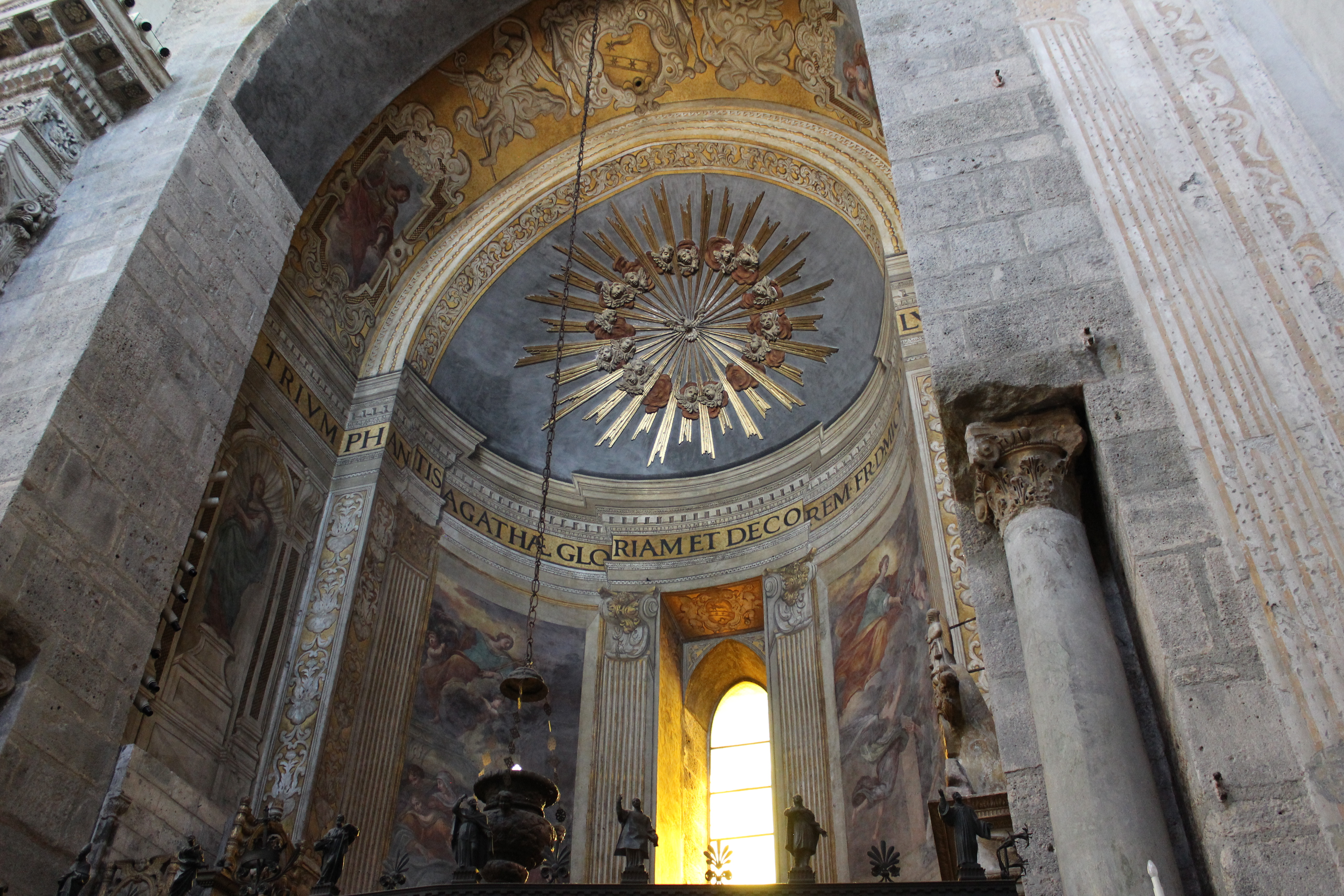
Detail from the apse of the Chapel of St. Agatha

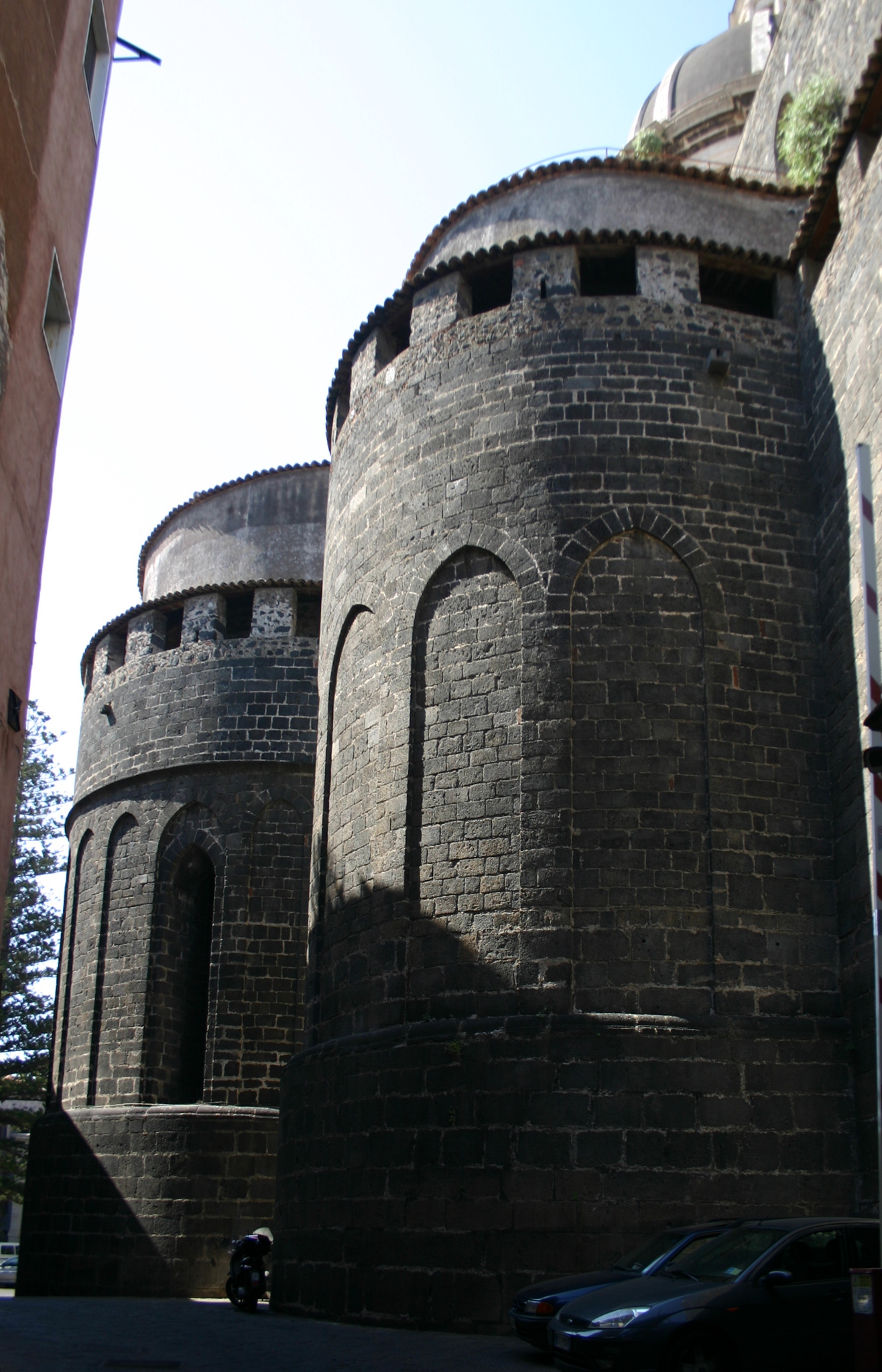
The Norman apses (1094)

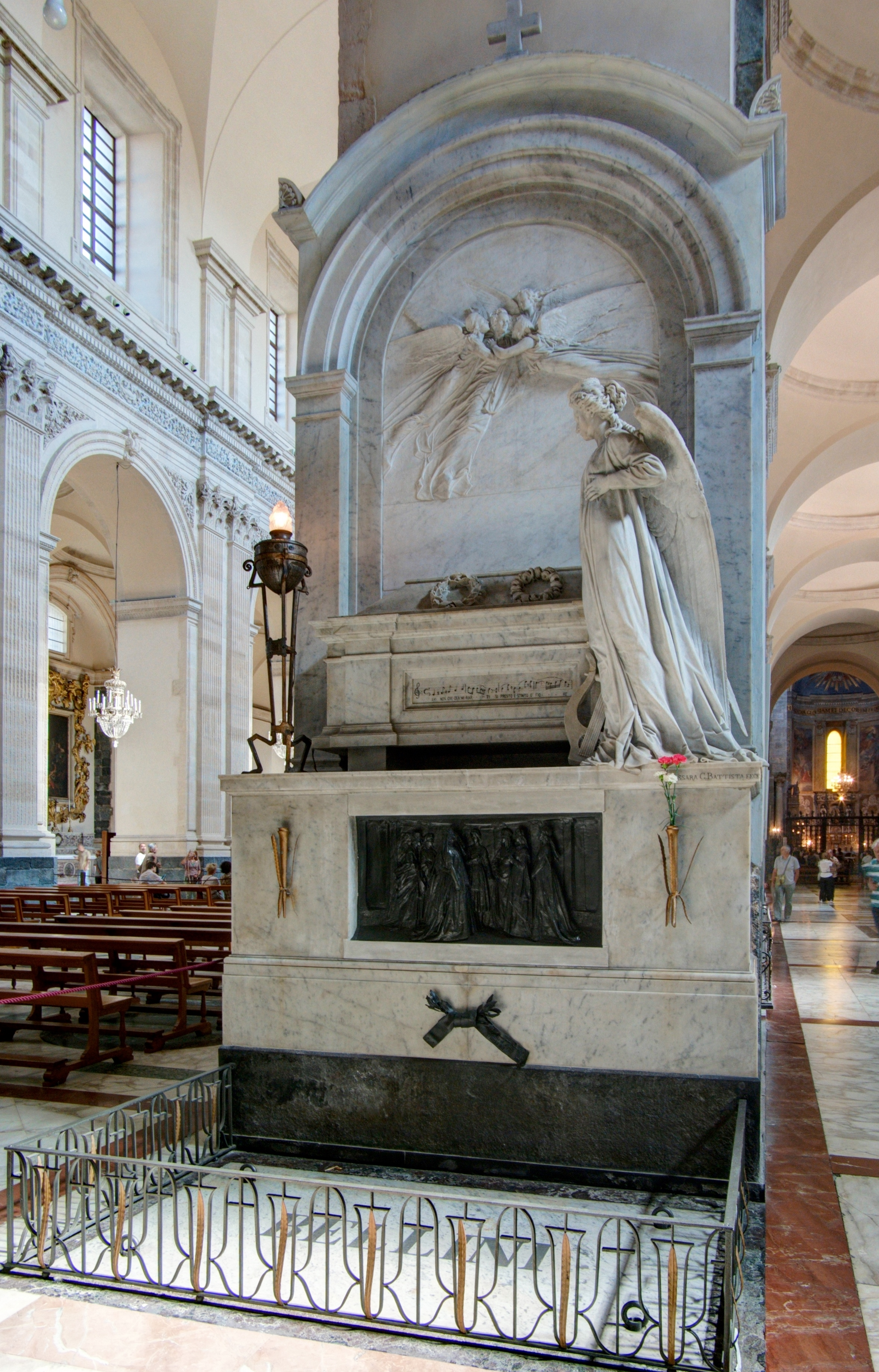
Vincenzo Bellini's grave

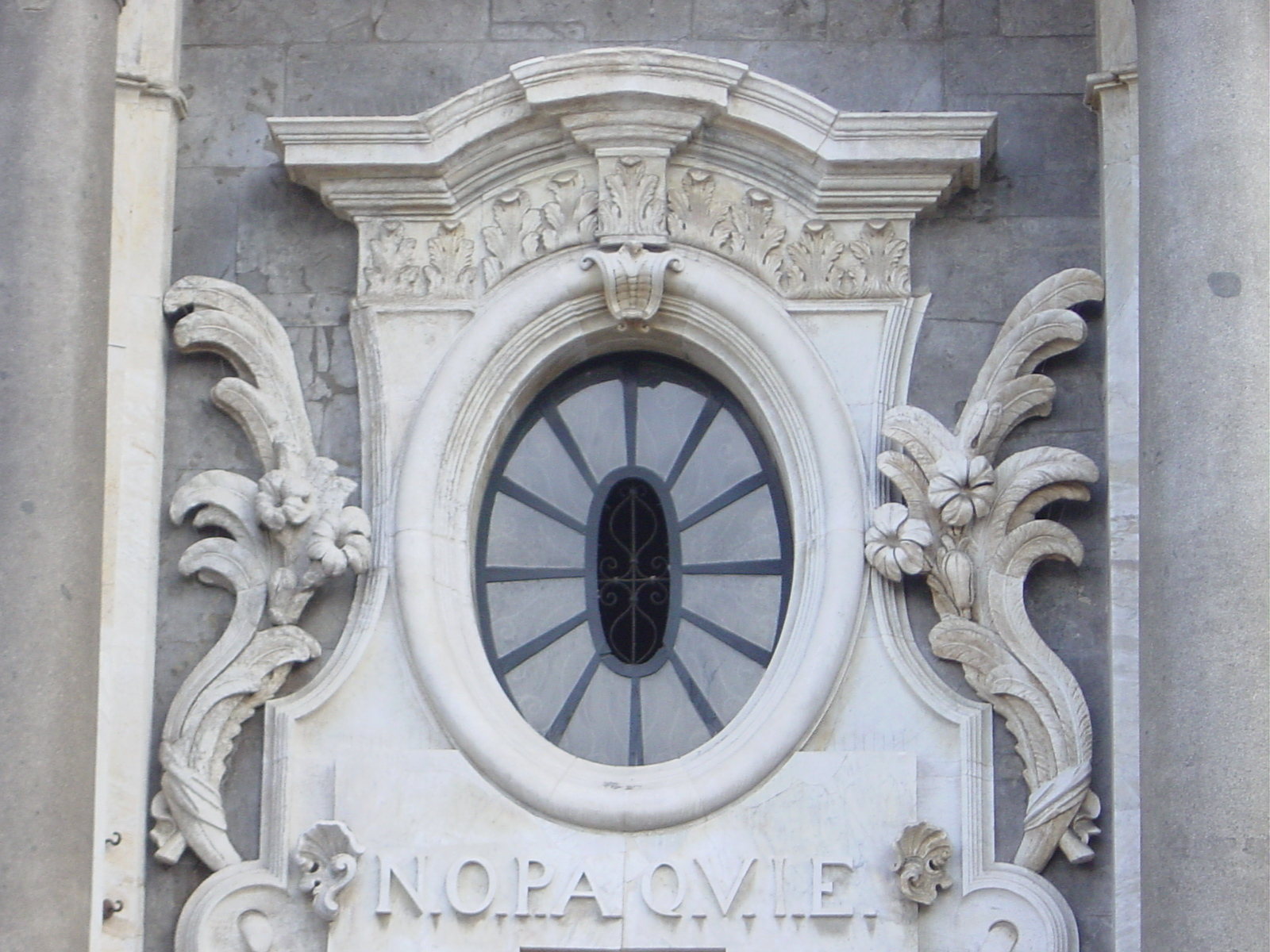
The northern Baroque window with the Latin acronym NOPAQVIE (Noli offendere Patriam Agathae quia ultrix injuriarum est), translated as "Offend not the country of Agatha, for she is the avenger of any injustice"

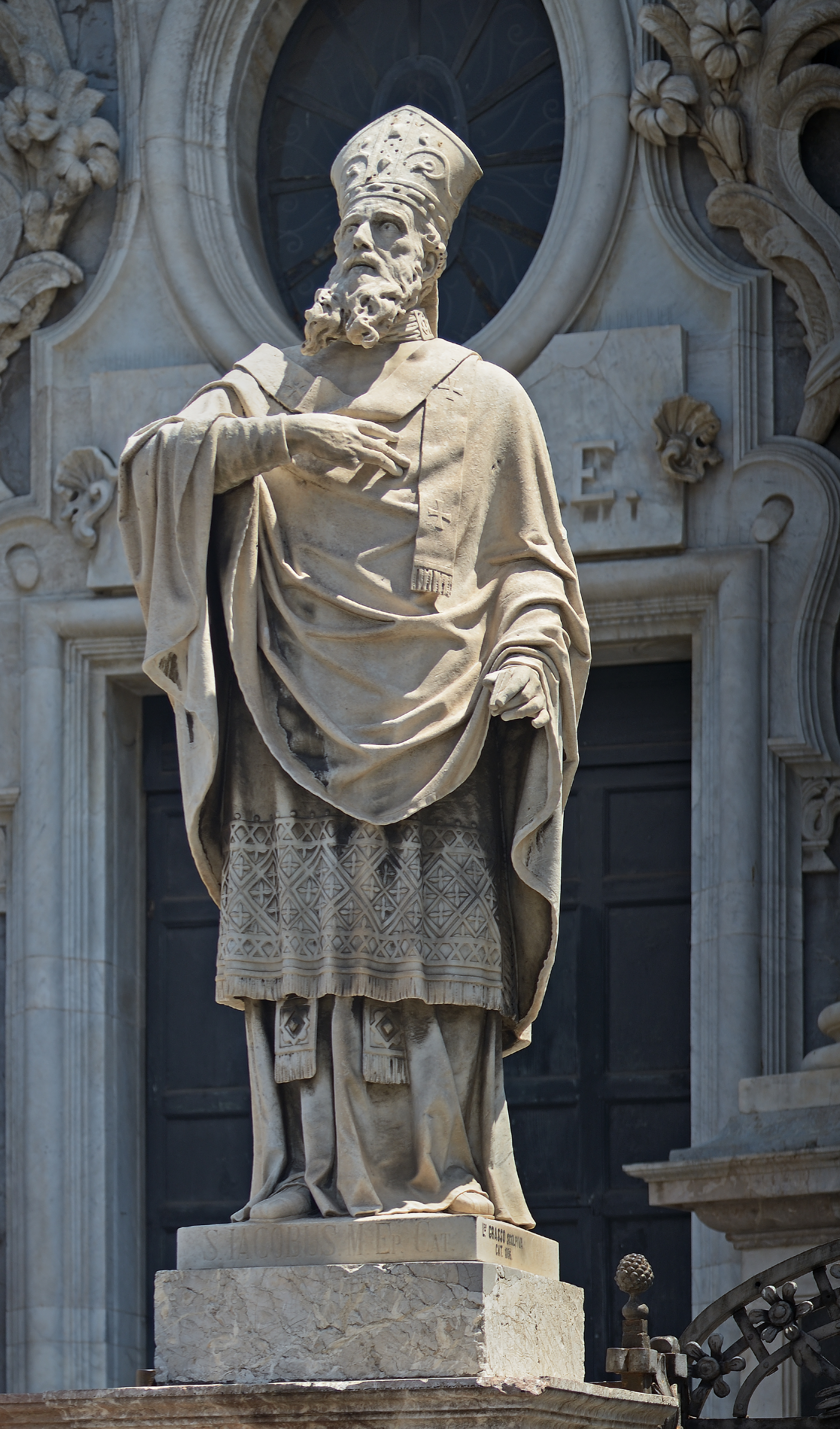
Statue of Saint Giacomo Confessore, near the door

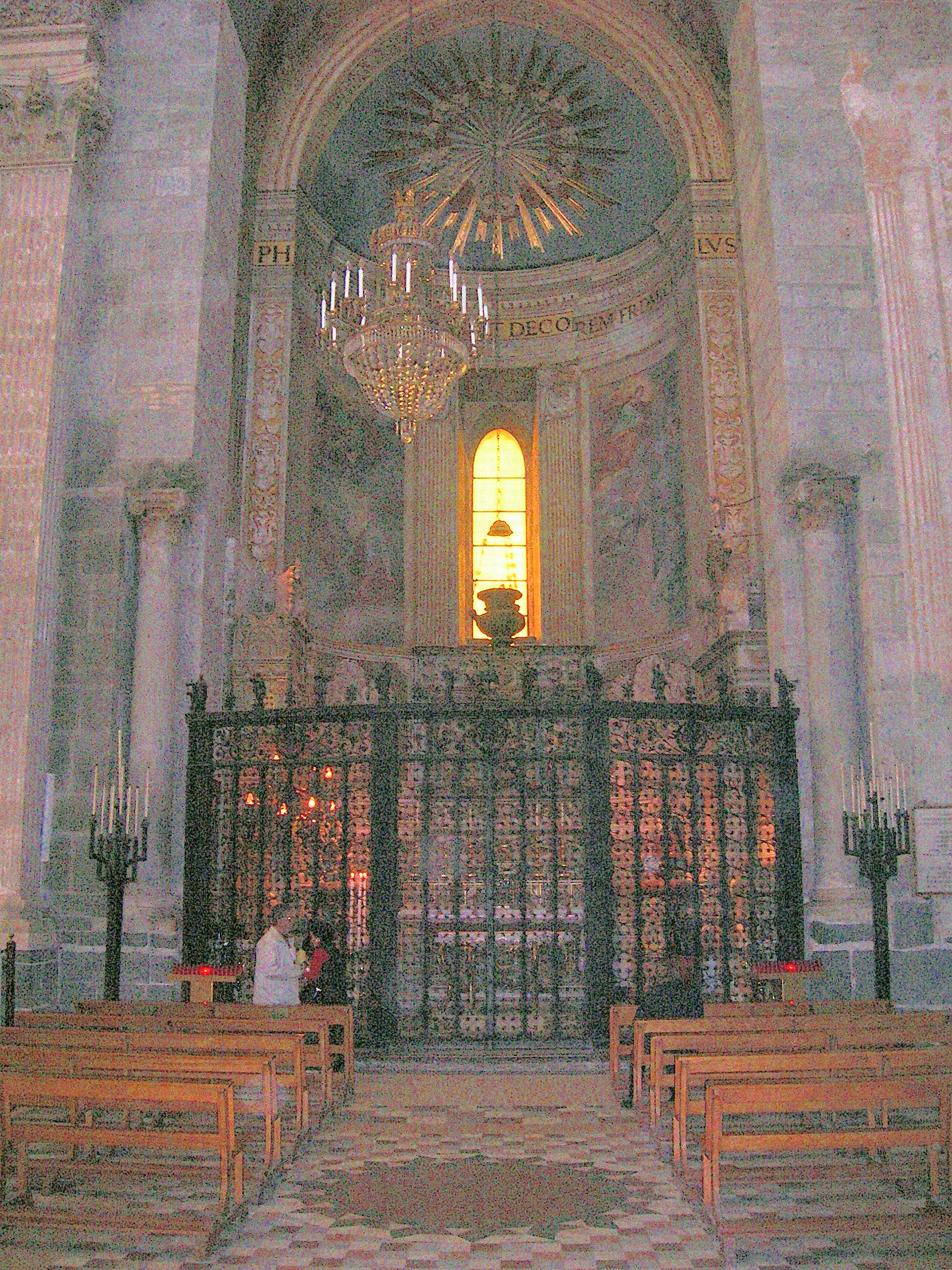
Chapel of Saint Agatha

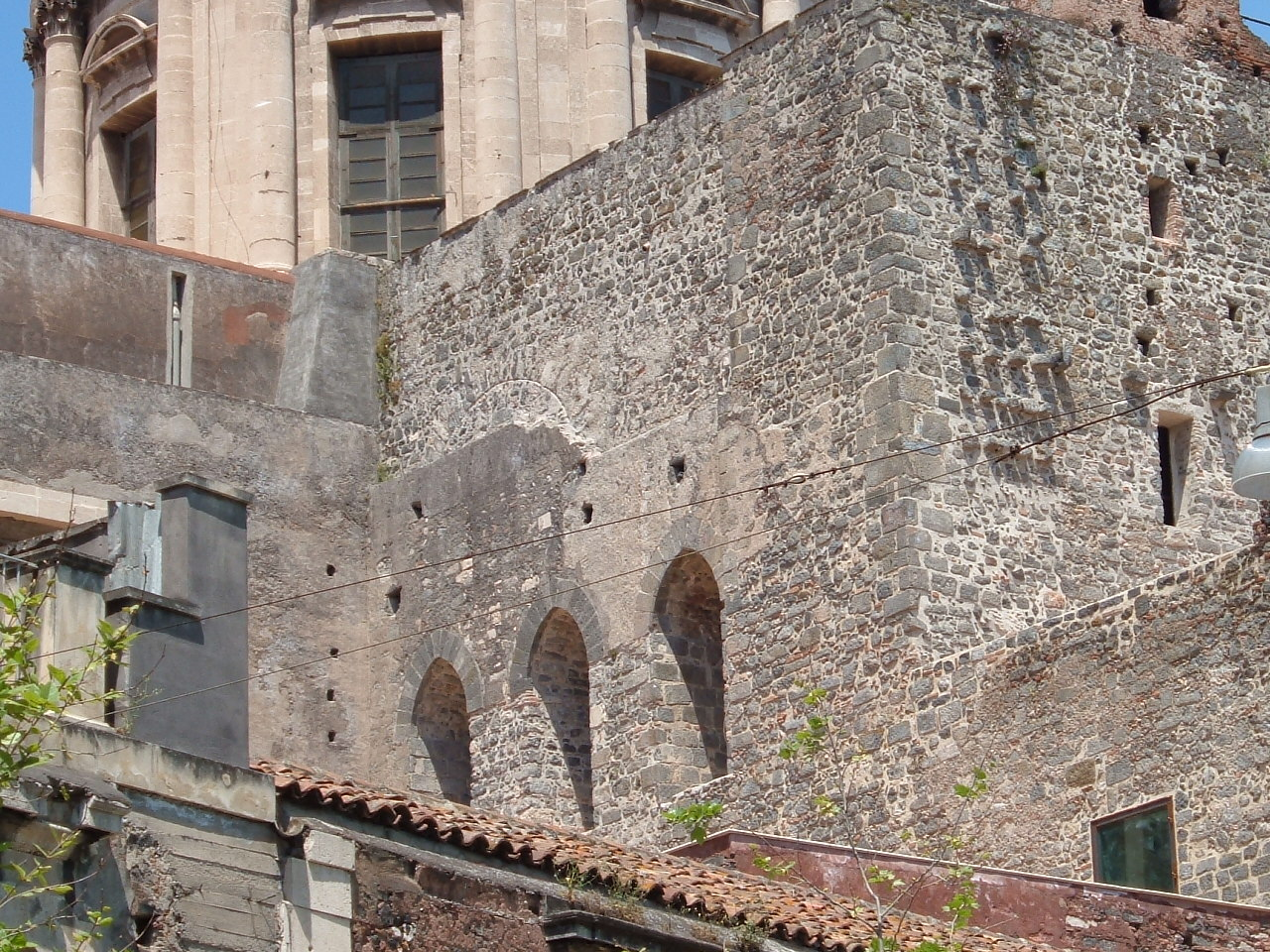
Detail of the 11th-century Norman transept

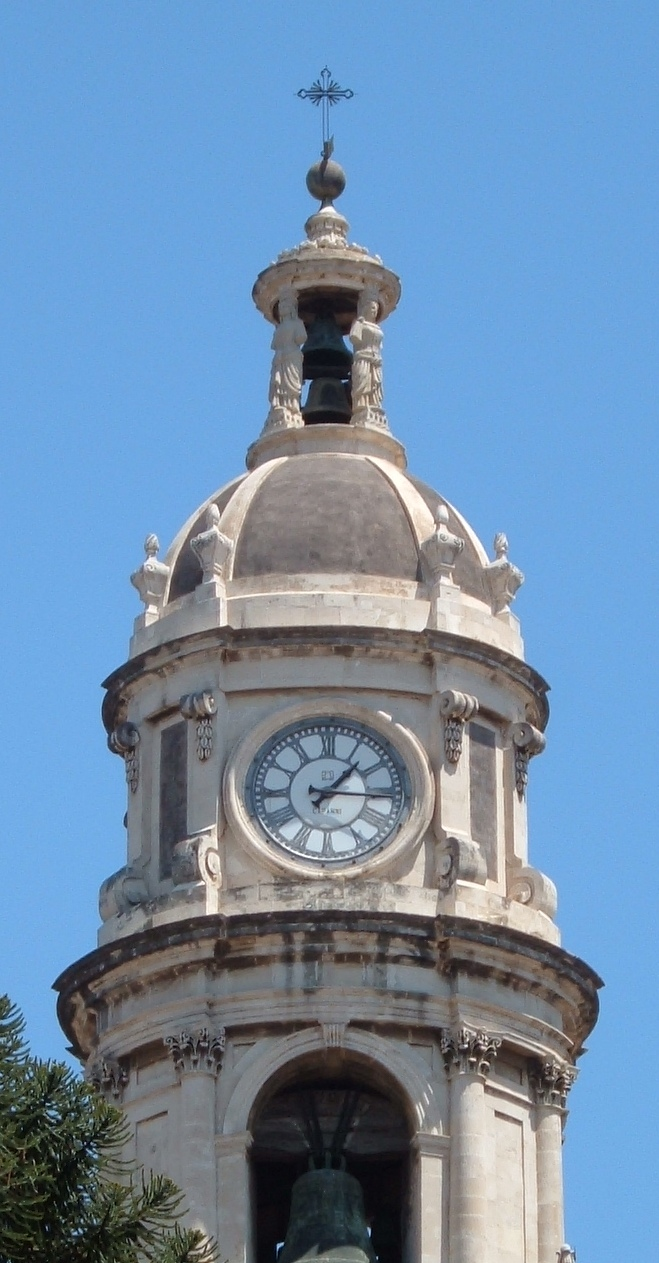
The bell tower, designed by Carmelo Sciuto Patti

== Sources ==
- Rasà Napoli, Giuseppe (1984). Guida alle Chiese di Catania. Tringale Editore.
