= Marino Caracciolo =

Neapolitan cardinal and diplomat

His Eminence Marino Caracciolo
- Cardinal-Deacon of Santa Maria in Aquiro
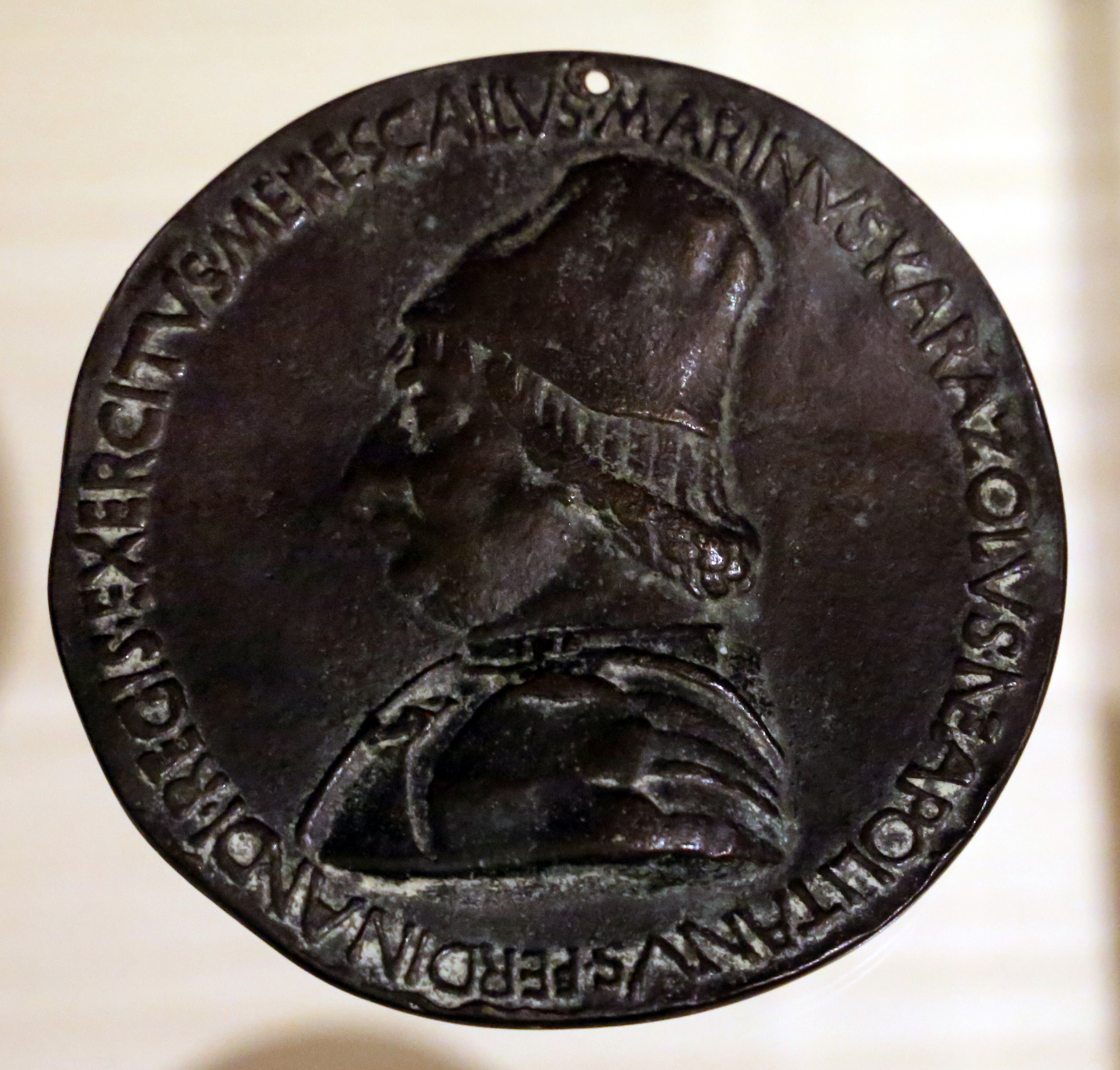
- Medal depicting Cardinal Caracciolo, 16th century
- Church: Catholic Church
- Appointed: 15 November 1535
- Term ended: 28 January 1538
- Predecessor: Gasparo Contarini
- Successor: Ippolito d'Este
- Other posts: Governor of Milan (1536-1538)
- Previous posts: Bishop of Catania (1529–1530, 1536-1537)

Orders
- Created cardinal: 21 May 1535 by Pope Paul III
- Rank: Cardinal-Deacon

Personal details
- Born: Marino Ascanio Caracciolo; 1468 Naples, Kingdom of Naples
- Died: 28 January 1538 (aged 69–70) Milan, Duchy of Milan
- Buried: Milan Cathedral
- Coat of arms

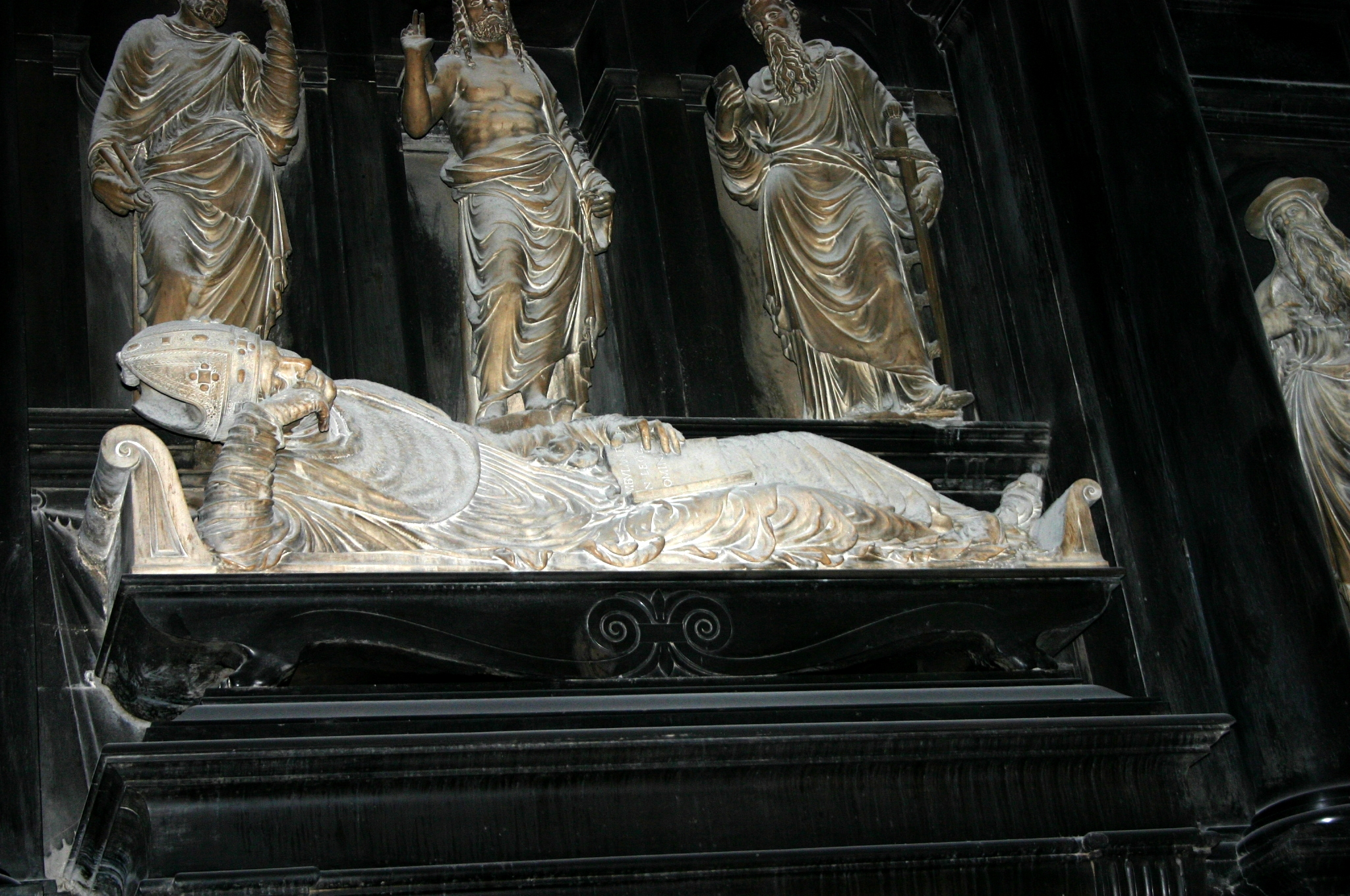
Portrait of Marino Caracciolo from his grave. Duomo of Milan.

Marino Caracciolo (1468 – 28 January 1538) was a Neapolitan cardinal and diplomat in the service of Emperor Charles V.

== Biography ==
Born in Naples into one of the most important families in the Kingdom of Naples; his father, Domizio, was governor of Calabria. Marino spent his youth and was educated under the tutelage of Cardinal Ascanio Sforza at the court of Milan. In 1505, Caracciolo was created by Pope Julius II, commendatory abbot of S. Maria di Teneto, in Reggio Emilia.

Ambassador of Duke Massimiliano Sforza to the Papal court in 1513, he was created an Apostolic Protonotary in 1515; in the same year he took part as orator of the Duke of Milan to the V Lateran Council.

In 1518, he was appointed Papal nuncio to Spain and in 1519 nuncio before the Diet of Augsburg. After the election of Emperor Charles V, he was appointed nuncio to the new emperor, and traveled to Ghent in August 1520. At the Diet of Worms in 1520, he worked with Cardinal Girolamo Aleandro in opposition to the supporters of Martin Luther. In May 1521, he left Worms to follow the emperor to Flanders. In November the Imperial court moved to Spain. Pope Adrian VI confirmed Caracciolo's position as nuncio.C. arrived in Venice In 16 June 1523, he was sent to Venice to persuade and conducted the negotiations with skill and with a happy outcome which led the Signoria to denounce an alliance with France.

With the death of Pope Adrian in September 1523, Caracciolo began to represent the Emperor's interests to Rome. In the same year he was enfeoffed with large estates in the Duchy of Milan (County of Vespolate 1524–1530, exchanged for County of Gallarate 1530). In 1524 he was created Bishop of Catania, but left the administration to his brother Scipione, as Charles V to the position of imperial orator to the Duke of Milan Francesco II Sforza. During the Lombardy campaign of 1524, he maintained contacts between Francesco Sforza and the leaders of the imperial army, the viceroy of Naples Charles of Lannoy and Fernando d'Ávalos, the marquis of Pescara, intervening often in defense of the civilian population.

== Later life ==
In July 1533, Caracciolo was sent by Charles V to take possession of the marquisate of Monferrato, the fate of which the emperor had submitted to his own arbitration after the extinction of the Paleologi dynasty and the rise of the claims of the Savoys and of the Gonzagas; subsequently he was designated among the arbiters of that dispute, which was finally resolved in favor of the Duke of Mantua.

He was created a Cardinal of the Holy Roman Church by Pope Paul III on 21 May 1535, but his name was not announced publicly (it was held in pectore by the Pope). He was welcomed at the Papal Court and received his red hat on 12 November 1535, and on 15 November given the gold ring and granted the title of Cardinal Deacon of Santa Maria in Aquiro.

In 1536, he was appointed by Charles V Governor of Milan but he only held power on civil and economic matters, the military power being given to Alfonso d'Avalos.

== Death ==
He died in Milan on 27 January 1538 and is buried in the Duomo of Milan; his funeral monument is attributed to Agostino Busti, known as Bambaia.

== Sources ==
- Eubel, Conradus, ed. (1923). Hierarchia catholica, Tomus 3 (in Latin) (second ed.). Münster: Libreria Regensbergiana.
- Miranda, Salvador. "CARACCIOLO, Marino Ascanio (1468-1538)". The Cardinals of the Holy Roman Church. Florida International University. OCLC 53276621.

Political offices
Preceded by Antonio de Leyva	Governors of the Duchy of Milan; 1536–1538	Succeeded by Alfonso d'Avalos
