= Vincenzo Cutelli =

Most Reverend Vincenzo Cutelli
- Bishop of Catania
- Church: Catholic Church
- Diocese: Diocese of Catania
- In office: 1577–1589
- Predecessor: Juan Orozco de Arce
- Successor: Juan Corrionero

Orders
- Consecration: 22 Sep 1577 by Giulio Antonio Santorio

Personal details
- Died: 28 June 1597

Vincenzo Cutelli (died 28 June 1597) was a Roman Catholic prelate who served as Bishop of Catania (1577–1589).

== Biography ==
Cutelli was a native of Catania. He was a Doctor of theology and a Doctor in utroque iure (Civil and Canon Law). He became a royal chaplain, and was an Apostolic Visitor in Spain, following which he was appointed Rector of the Patrimony of Saint Peter (governor of southern Tuscany).

He was nominated to the episcopacy by King Philip II of Spain, and, on 11 September 1577, Vincenzo Cutelli was appointed by Pope Gregory XIII as Bishop of Catania, with the provision that he pay annual pensions out of his episcopal income to two persons to be named by the Pope. He was consecrated in Rome by Pope Gregory. On 22 September 1577, he was consecrated bishop by Giulio Antonio Santorio, Cardinal-Priest of San Bartolomeo all'Isola. He served as Bishop of Catania until his resignation in 1589. During his last two years as bishop, however, he was under suspension, and an Apostolic Vicar, was appointed by the Pope. Nonetheless he continued to exercise the spiritual and temporal powers of the Bishop of Catania. He was finally deprived of his episcopal dignity by the Pope on 19 January 1589.

Cutelli died in Rome on 28 June 1597, and was buried in Sant'Andrea delle Fratte.

While bishop, he was the principal co-consecrator of Leonard Abel, Titular Bishop of Sidon (1582).

== Sources ==
- Eubel, Conradus, ed. (1923). Hierarchia catholica, Tomus 3 (second ed.). Münster: Libreria Regensbergiana. (in Latin)
- Pirro, Rocco (1733). Mongitore, Antonino (ed.). Sicilia sacra, disquisitionibus et notitiis illustrata. Vol. Tomus primus (third ed.). Palermo: Haeredes P. Coppulae.
- Cheney, David M. "Archdiocese of Catania". Catholic-Hierarchy.org. (for Chronology of Bishops) ^{[self-published]}
- Chow, Gabriel. "Metropolitan Archdiocese of Catania". GCatholic.org. (for Chronology of Bishops) ^{[self-published]}

Catholic Church titles
Preceded by Juan Orozco de Arce	Bishop of Catania; 1577–1589	Succeeded by Juan Corrionero
