= Raimundo Rubí =

Most Reverend Raimundo Rubí
- Bishop of Catania
- Church: Catholic Church
- Diocese: Diocese of Catania
- In office: 1727–1729
- Predecessor: Alessandro Burgos
- Successor: Pietro Galletti

Orders
- Ordination: 17 December 1689
- Consecration: 8 December 1727 by Pope Benedict XIII

Personal details
- Born: 18 October 1665 Barcelona, Spain
- Died: 20 January 1729 (age 63) Catania, Italy

Raimundo Rubí, O. Cart. (18 October 1665 – 20 January 1729) was a Roman Catholic prelate who served as Bishop of Catania (1727–1729).

== Biography ==
Raimundo Rubí was born in Barcelona, Spain on 18 October 1665 and ordained a priest in the Carthusian Order on 17 December 1689. He was selected as Bishop of Catania and confirmed by Pope Benedict XIII on 26 November 1727. He was consecrated bishop by Benedict on 8 December 1727, with Francesco Antonio Finy, Titular Archbishop of Damascus, and VIncenzo Maria Mazzoleni, Archbishop of Corfu, serving as co-consecrators. He served as Bishop of Catania until his death on 20 January 1729.

Catholic Church titles
Preceded by Alessandro Burgos	Bishop of Catania; 1727–1729	Succeeded by Pietro Galletti
