= William de Blois (bishop of Lincoln) =

11th and 12th-century Bishop of Lincoln

- Bishop of Lincoln
- Elected: about 6 July 1203
- Term ended: 10 May 1206
- Predecessor: Hugh of Avalon
- Successor: Hugh of Wells
- Other post: Precentor of Lincoln

Orders
- Consecration: 24 August 1203 by William of Sainte-Mère-Eglise, Bishop of London

Personal details
- Died: 10 May 1206

William de Blois (or William of Blois; died 1206) was a medieval Bishop of Lincoln. He first served in the household of Hugh du Puiset, the Bishop of Durham, then later served the household of Hugh of Avalon, Bishop of Lincoln. After Hugh's death and a two-year vacancy in the see, or bishopric, Blois was elected to succeed Hugh in 1203. Little is known about his episcopate, although 86 of his documents survive from that time period. He died in 1206 and was buried in his cathedral.

== Early life ==
Possibly related to Hugh de Puiset the bishop of Durham, who he went on to serve later in life, Blois probably came from Blois in France. His relationship with Puiset reinforces the likelihood of his origins being in Blois, as Puiset was a nephew of King Stephen of England and Stephen's brother Henry of Blois, the Bishop of Winchester, both of whom came from Blois. Nothing else is known of Blois' origins. He was titled magister, implying that he attended a university and was well-educated. He taught at the school of Paris for a while, where at one point a townswoman tried to seduce him, resulting in the medieval writer Gerald of Wales later recounting the humorous story of how Blois resisted the lady's advances.

Blois was frequently a witness to Puiset's charters, and was named as rector of a parish church in the city of Durham, appointed by Puiset. By the late 1180s, Blois had moved to the household of Hugh of Avalon, the Bishop of Lincoln. Blois was a subdean, an ecclesiastical official, of the diocese of Lincoln by 22 March 1194, probably from about 1189. He was a frequent witness to Hugh's charters in the late 1180s. Although he was now serving Hugh, Blois did not entirely quit the service of Puiset, and was present at Puiset's deathbed in 1195. He was named precentor of Lincoln in 1197, in succession to the medieval writer Walter Map. Besides Hugh and Puiset, he also served Pope Innocent III. He may be the Master William of Blois who is a witness to some Scottish charters.

== Bishop of Lincoln ==
Hugh of Avalon died on 16 November 1200, but no new bishop was elected for over two years. King John first tried to impose his own appointee, but was unable to force his choice on the cathedral chapter, who were responsible for electing a new bishop. John then left the see vacant, and some contemporaries accused the king of doing so to secure the revenues of the see for himself because of the regalian right English kings had to receive all the income from a vacant bishopric. Eventually the cathedral chapter was allowed to perform an election, and Blois was elected about 6 July 1203 and consecrated on 24 August 1203 at Canterbury. The consecration was performed by William of Sainte-Mère-Eglise, the Bishop of London, because Hubert Walter, the Archbishop of Canterbury was ill and unable to perform the service which would normally have been his right.

Most of what is known about Blois' episcopate comes from his acta, or records; 86 of them survive. There is an early 14th-century reference to Blois' matricula, which can mean register, list, or list of students, but given the distance in time from when it was recorded to Blois' episcopate, it is unclear what exactly was meant by this. Nor has any such document survived. Blois' acta show him to have been an active and diligent administrator, especially concerned with the establishment of vicarages and with parish care. He also spent time mediating disputes, including one in 1204 over a church at Eynesbury that was disputed between Saer de Quincy, the canons of Newnham Priory and monks of St Neot's Priory. Most of his clerks and household members appear to have been non-relatives, with only another William de Blois, appointed Archdeacon of Buckingham by the bishop before becoming Bishop of Worcester in 1218, being a relative.

Blois died on 10 May 1206, and was buried in Lincoln Cathedral. In the early fourteenth century, he was still remembered well by the cathedral chapter and was described as learned and kindly by the 14th century writer John Schalby, who wrote a work on the lives of the bishops of Lincoln. Besides his kinsman William de Blois, another known relative was a nephew, William de Marum. Marum succeeded his uncle as rector in Durham. He was once identified with another William of Blois, who was a poet and the brother of Peter of Blois, but there is no evidence supports that identification.

== Citations ==
Catholic Church titles
Preceded by Hugh of Avalon	Bishop of Lincoln; 1203–1206	Succeeded by Hugh of Wells
