= Giovanni Pesce =

Italian partisan

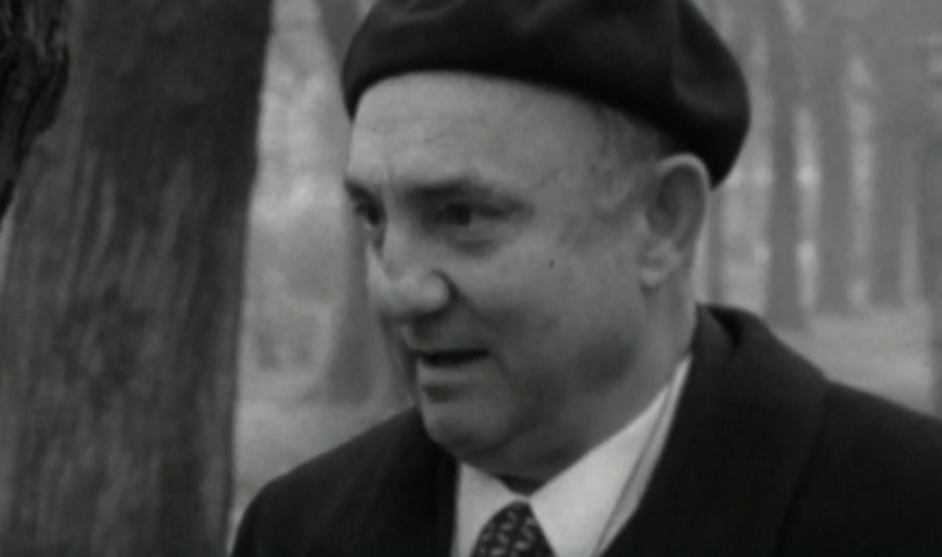
Giovanni Pesce in 1973

Giovanni Pesce (also known as 'Visone', 22 February 1918 – Milan, 27 July 2007) was an Italian anti-fascist partisan who fought in the Spanish Civil War and World War II. A former Communist councillor for Milan, he wrote extensively about his experiences in several books.

== Early life ==
Born in Visone, Pesce was raised in Grand Combe near Nîmes, France, the son of working class immigrants from Piedmont, Italy. His father worked as a low-paid miner and his mother ran a restaurant for miners out of the family's home. The mining community was populated mostly by immigrants, especially Italians. After he completed his education, Pesce began working in the mines as a teenager. Through living around and working in the mines, he discovered socialist and left-wing politics—both especially popular among the immigrant miners—and became a convinced communist. Along with the other miners, he struggled for better wages and working conditions through demonstrations and related activism.

== Spanish civil war ==
When Pesce was still in his teens, he volunteered to fight in the International Brigades in the Spanish Civil War. Pesce fought among International Brigade volunteers from several dozen other nations, saw a lot of action, and successfully used both machine guns and light anti-tank small arms.

== World War II and later years ==
Pesce's Spanish Civil War career ended with incarceration as a prisoner of war among fellow International Brigade volunteers. When he got out, he went to Piedmont to stay with his extended family, and discovered first-hand the fascism that had taken hold there. Connecting with other ex-International Brigade fighters and communist activists, he seamlessly made the transition from anti-Franco Spanish Civil War fighter to Italian World War II anti-fascist and anti-Nazi partisan.

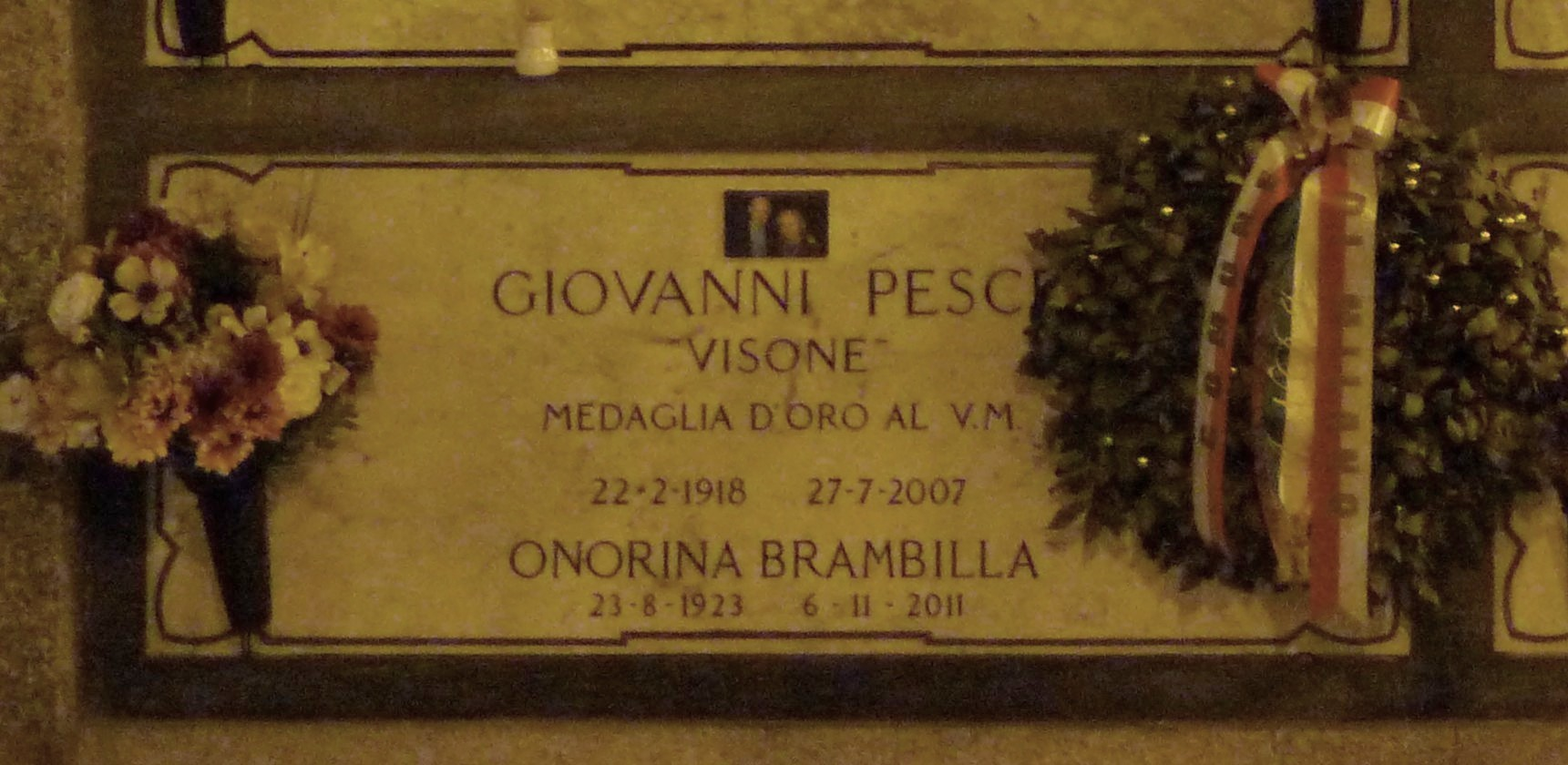
Pesce's grave at the Monumental Cemetery of Milan in 2015

As a member of the GAP (Gruppi di Azione Patriottica), Pesce lived clandestinely, and planned and participated in many successful partisan guerilla actions (including sabotage and assassinations against Italian fascists, German military personnel, and their collaborators) throughout World War II years. His codename for part of the war was "Visone", which is both a province of Piedmont and the Italian word for mink. The Germans and fascists discovered Pesce's significance and codename, but although they used their anti-partisan personnel to try to find and capture him, they never succeeded.

Pesce survived the war and wrote about his experiences. He died in 2007 in Milan, Italy, and is buried at the city's Monumental Cemetery.

== Notable actions ==
=== Hidden V-2 / V-2 Fuse Mechanism Factory ===
Pesce planned an attack against a hidden, secret factory that was producing crucial parts for V-1 and V-2 rockets. Around that time the rockets were being used en masse by the Germans to attack civilian areas on the coast of Britain. On the afternoon of December 9, 1944, he and other GAP volunteers executed the attack. The GAP set their bombs to go off immediately after the workers left for the day, so that the workers would not be injured. After the bombs exploded, Pesce walked among the throng of workers to distribute anti-fascist fliers explaining the action (the purpose of the factory had been kept secret from the workers) and shout anti-fascist slogans before he fled.

=== Colonel Cesarini ===
In March 1945, Pesce planned and single-handedly carried out the assassination of Colonel Cesarini, an Italian fascist who had overseen a massive wave of arrests and deportations to German concentration camps of Italian factory workers (anti-fascist sentiment had been running high in the factory). In broad daylight and on a crowded city street, Pesce used revolvers to kill both Cesarini and Cesarini's bodyguard.

== Sources ==
- And No Quarter: An Italian Partisan in World War II, Memoirs of Giovanni Pesce, translated by Frederick M. Shaine, Ohio University Press, 1972, ISBN 0-8214-0081-9.
