= Birillus =

Saint Birillus

Bishop of Catania
- Died: 90
- Venerated in: Roman Catholic Church
- Feast: 21 March

Birillus (died 90 AD) of Antioch was an early Christian saint. He was ordained to the priesthood by Saint Peter and became the first evangelizer and the first bishop of Catania in Sicily.
