= Peter of Blois =

French cleric

Peter of Blois (Latin: Petrus Blesensis; French: Pierre de Blois; c. 1130 – c. 1211) was a French cleric, theologian, poet and diplomat. He is particularly noted for his corpus of Latin letters.

== Early life and education ==
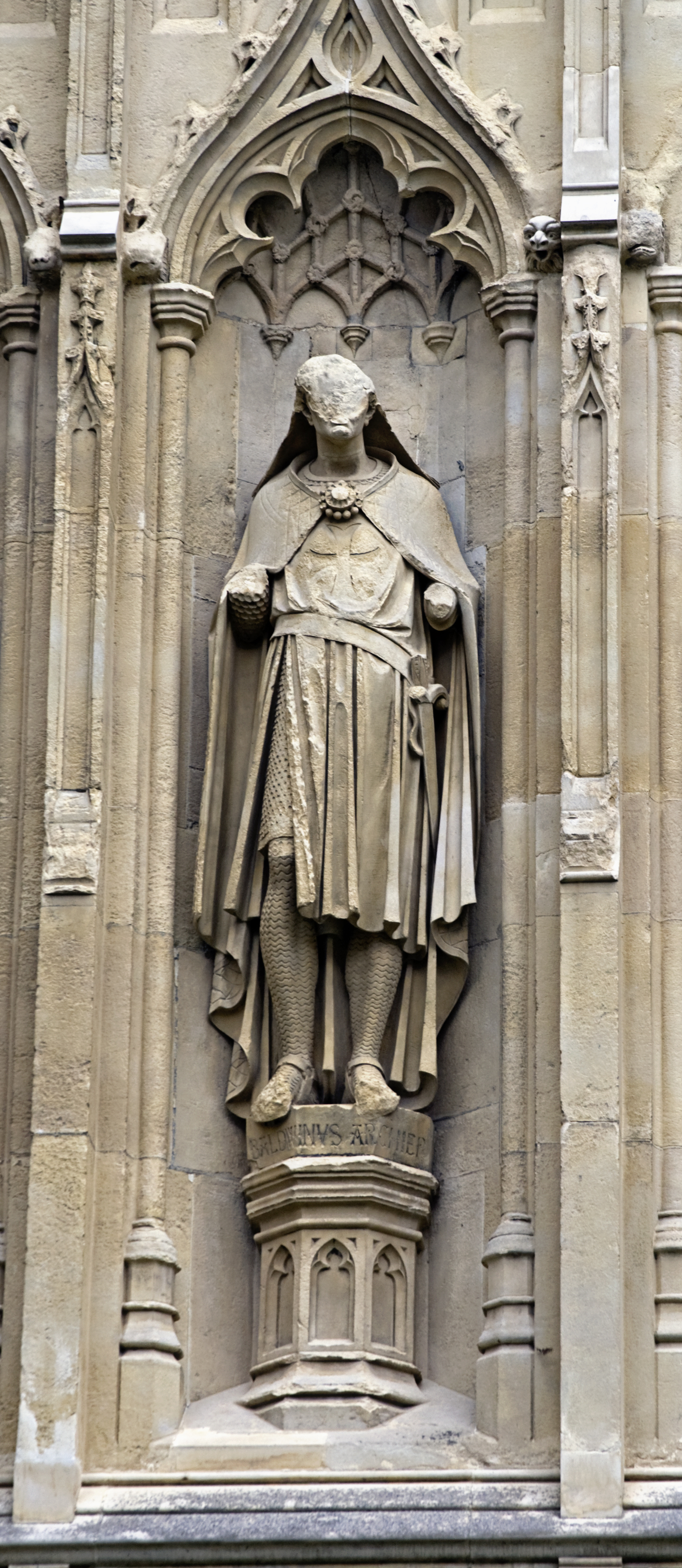
Baldwin of Forde, Peter's tutor and friend, as depicted on the exterior of Canterbury Cathedral.

Peter of Blois was born about 1130. Earlier opinion tended to place the date later in the 1130s, but an earlier date is now considered more likely. His family were minor nobility of Breton origin.

After an early visit to Paris, Peter received his literary education at the school attached to Tours Cathedral in the early 1140s probably accompanied and mentored by an older namesake and relative, Pierre de Blois. He studied under Bernard Silvestris, who, he later recalled, urged him to “take up in truth not fables, but history” and made him memorise the letters of Hildebert, a former Archbishop of Tours. It has been thought Peter also studied under the English philosopher and theologian John of Salisbury, but this is now generally discounted.

Peter then studied Roman law at the University of Bologna, a centre for legal studies. Here he was tutored by Baldwin of Forde, a future Archbishop of Canterbury, and both studied under Umberto Crivelli, the future Pope Urban III. Peter was much more strongly attracted to the rhetorical and literary aspects of the subject than to jurisprudence: as he wrote later, “sporting with its glorious verbal trappings and charming, fanciful oratorical urbanity, attracted me powerfully and intoxicated my mind.”

Around 1155 Peter went to study theology in Paris, remaining there for about 11 years. Few details of his studies are extant. It appears that he supported himself during his advanced studies by taking students of his own, including two sons of Josceline de Bohon, a long-serving Bishop of Salisbury.

It was probably during his student years that he composed a number of Latin sequences after the manner of the Goliards, some of which were preserved in the Carmina Burana collection. He also wrote Vacillantis trutine libramine.

== The Sicilian adventure ==
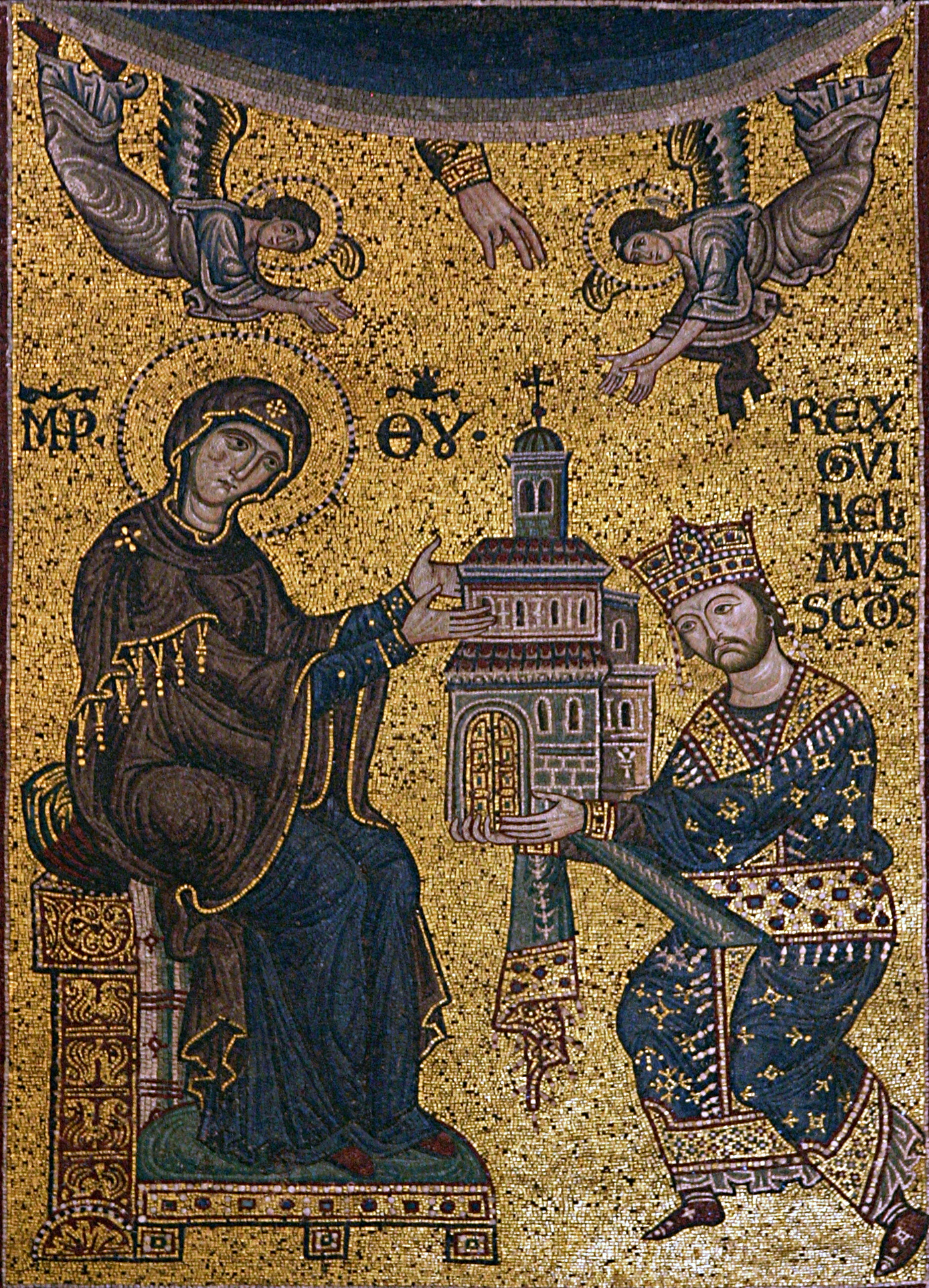
Peter's pupil, William II, depicted offering Monreale Cathedral to the Virgin Mary.

In 1166 the regent of Sicily, Margaret of Navarre, a relative of the Counts of Perche, wrote to her relatives in France, particularly Rotrou, the Archbishop of Rouen, to ask for help during the minority of her son, William II. Peter of Blois and his brother Guillaume arrived in Sicily in September of that year, as part of a French party of 37 that included Stephen du Perche and Walter of the Mill. Peter became tutor to the young king, guardian of the royal seal and a key adviser to Queen Margaret, while Guillaume was appointed abbot of a monastery near Maletto. However, the French clique around the regency proved unpopular with the Sicilian nobility. A revolt against French domination forced Stephen to resign the chancellorship and the Archbishopric of Palermo in 1169. Peter left the island to seek opportunities elsewhere, sailing initially to Genoa and then travelling back to France.

There his connection with Archbishop Rotrou proved useful, drawing him into a letter-writing campaign focussed on Henry II of England's conflict with Thomas Becket. This brought him back into contact with Reginald Fitz Jocelin, his former pupil from his days in Paris, who was now Henry's chief agent in the dispute. When Reginald was made Bishop of Bath in 1173, his role in the Becket affair made papal approval problematic and Peter's letters on his behalf proved helpful in rallying support.

== Angevin service ==
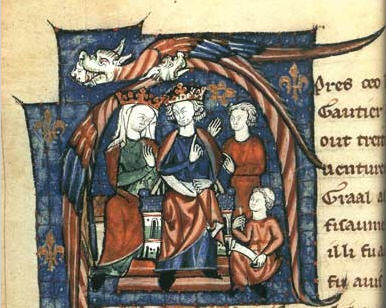
Henry II and Eleanor of Aquitaine holding court.

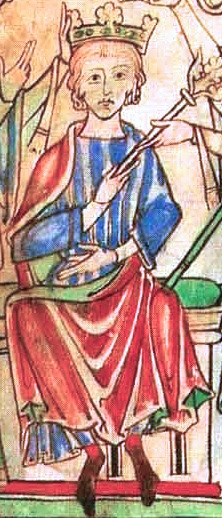
The Young King Henry, whose rebellion against his father signalled a rupture in the Angevin dynasty.

=== Diplomat and apologist ===
Around 1173, Peter went to England to take up a post as chief letter-writer for Richard of Dover, Becket's successor as Archbishop. He also entered the service of Henry II, acting as a diplomat in his negotiations with Louis VII of France and the Papacy. His arrival in England approximately coincided with the rupture of the ruling family and the eruption of civil strife all over the Angevin Empire, carefully fomented by the French monarchy. Peter wrote an open letter to the queen, Eleanor of Aquitaine, to "deplore publicly and regretfully that, while you are a most prudent woman, you have left your husband." However, when in 1183 Henry the Young King died during the revolt against his father, Peter wrote to Eleanor a letter of reasoned consolation.

Peter was a well-connected controversialist and propagandist for Henry II. He wrote in praise of him to continental contacts, like Walter Ophamil, now Archbishop of Palermo, defending him against the charge that he had deliberately instigated the murder of Thomas Becket. In introducing the subject of Becket's death, Peter mentioned in passing his own clerical order: in verbo Domini et in ordine diaconi vobis dico – “in the Word of God and the order of deacon I speak to you.” At some stage in his education, he had been ordained a deacon and he seems to have avoided ordination to the priesthood.

In 1176 Peter was appointed Chancellor of the Archdiocese of Canterbury, the chief record keeper and Latin secretary, serving Richard of Dover. Probably in the same year, he was appointed Archdeacon of Bath, a position he held until his death. It was probably in Henry's reign that he was appointed Dean of the College of Wolverhampton, which he found corrupt.

Peter was in Rome in 1179 and there displayed the improvidence which was to become an important feature of his later life. His failure to repay a debt caused Pope Alexander III to write to the Archbishop on behalf of the creditor. This was a cause célèbre sufficient for inclusion in a compendium of canon law issued in 1234 by Pope Gregory IX. Richard of Dover died in 1184 and, after some delay, the king succeeded in getting Baldwin of Forde, Peter's friend and tutor from his Bologna days, installed as Archbishop of Canterbury. He confirmed Peter in his position as letter writer but also made him his chief legal adviser.

=== The Canterbury Cathedral chapter controversy ===
Baldwin soon created a legal storm that was to engulf Peter, threatening his career. He was determined to reform the diocese thoroughly, making it function more efficiently as a base for his position as one of the chief magnates of the realm. He saw the chapter of Canterbury Cathedral as a major obstacle. Like most cathedral establishments, it had consisted of secular clergy until the Norman Conquest, after which it was reconstituted as a community of Benedictine monks, known variously as the Priory of the Holy Trinity or Christchurch. The mutual antagonism was sharpened by the rivalry between their respective monastic orders, as Baldwin was a Cistercian. He began by recovering diocesan property which his predecessor had alienated to the priory in order to support the pilgrim traffic, centred on the shrine of Thomas Becket, as well as confiscating the xenia, or Easter offerings – a process which was authorised by Pope Lucius III. However, the monks of the chapter were soon complaining to his successor, Urban III, that his reforms were going too far and succeeded in getting the Pope to order restoration of some of the confiscated churches. Urban initially welcomed some aspects of Baldwin's overarching plan to move the chapter to Hackington, north of Canterbury, and to build a second base for the diocese at Lambeth, directly facing the centres of secular power in London and Westminster. However, the plan unfolded to include the replacement of the monastic chapter with a new episcopal staff, consisting of colleges of secular clergy at Hackington and Lambeth.

Seeing their influence and wealth slipping from their grasp, the Canterbury monks appealed to both the king and to Rome. Baldwin suspended the prior in December 1186 and the monks immediately began a letter-writing campaign to mobilise bishops, archbishops, even Philip II of France, in their cause. Peter of Blois was despatched to the papal court at Verona to counter the chapter's arguments, which were presented by a skilled Roman lawyer called Pillius. As Urban was his old law teacher, he could be expected to have at least insight, and probably influence. However, his enjoyment of Roman law had always been aesthetic rather than technical.

Peter of Blois and the Popes

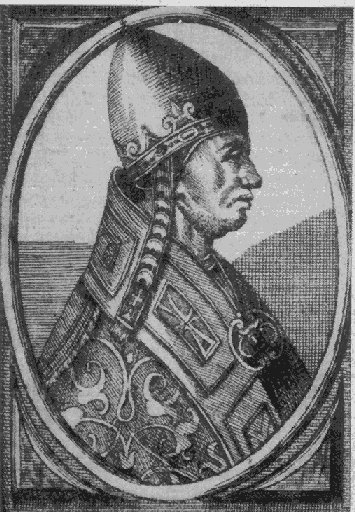
Pope Alexander III (1159–81), who complained to Archbishop Richard about Peter's failure to pay his debts.

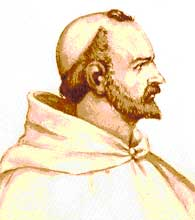
Pope Lucius III (1181–85), who gave initial papal support to Baldwin's reforms.

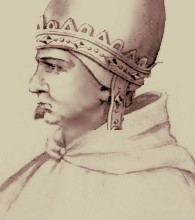
Pope Urban III (1185–87), who, as Umberto Crivelli, was Peter's master at the University of Bologna, and who later heard him argue against the appeal of the Canterbury Cathedral chapter.

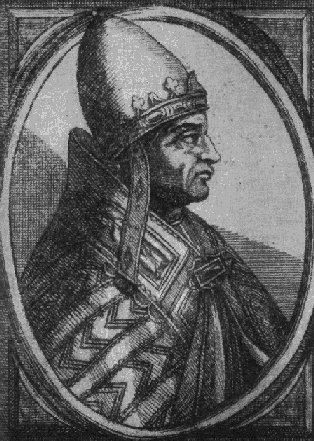
Pope Gregory VIII (1187), who succeeded Urban III but survived for only two months, leaving the Canterbury priory appeal unresolved..

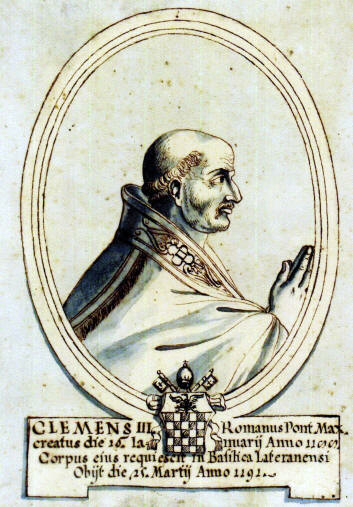
Pope Clement III (1187–91), who finally found against Archbishop Baldwin, severely damaging Peter's reputation as a lawyer.

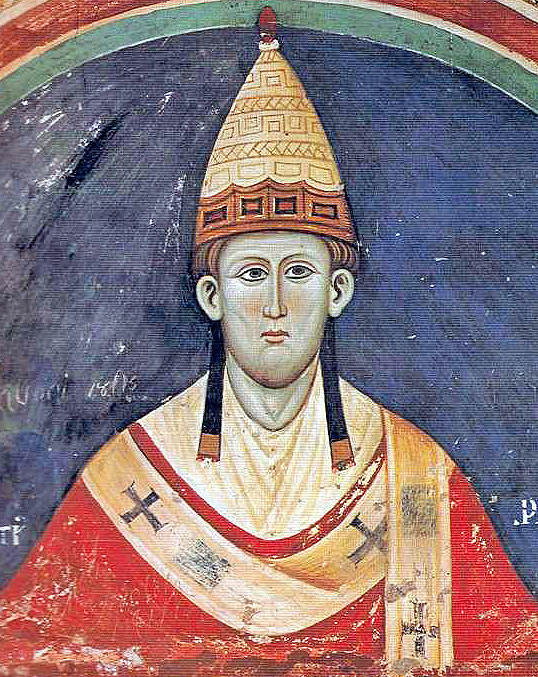
Pope Innocent III (1198-1216), who authorised Peter's abortive attempts to purge the church at Wolverhampton.

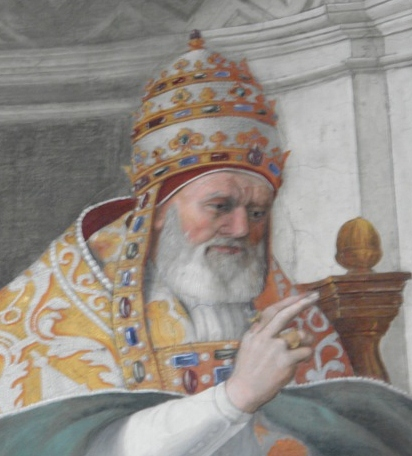
Pope Gregory IX (1227–41), whose codification of canon law mentions Peter in its clampdown on clerical indebtedness.

On 1 March 1187, before Peter's arrival, the Pope ordered Baldwin to lift the suspension of Prior Honorius, who had already reached Verona. Peter arrived at Verona a few days later to find the Pope had adjourned the case until 10 April, giving Peter no chance to plead formally while a further series of decrees was issued in the monks' favour. However, Peter was no more successful in open court, suffering a continuing series of defeats. On 9 May the Pope ordered Archbishop Baldwin to cease building his new church at Hackington, abolished the fraternity he had established to staff and support it, and expressed surprise that he had so far resisted restoration of the situation to that prevailing before the appeal. Peter remained at Verona, arguing the case, until October, and then followed the papal court to Ferrara. Provocative behaviour back home did not help Peter. Baldwin continued to build his church in defiance of the Pope but with the king's support, although he did move the site some distance to the west, hurriedly putting up a wooden chapel in St Dunstan's parish. In August he seized the chapter's manors, suspending and even excommunicating its members as he saw fit.

On 3 October, having reached Ferrara, the Pope raised the stakes by ordering Baldwin actually to demolish his new headquarters, to desecrate the site and to suspend its clergy, to restore all members of the existing chapter to office and to refrain from further actions against them while the case continued. He was given 30 days to comply. R. W. Southern alleges that Peter made a last, personal appeal to his old teacher while riding from Verona to Ferrara, and that the Pope was so incensed by the attempt to circumvent legal procedure that he died the following day of a heart attack. Kingsford's account is much less dramatic, without the foreshortened time scheme. The Pope's letter from Ferrara seems to have preceded his death by some weeks: he died on 19 October and was buried on the 20th, while Pope Gregory VIII was elected on 21 October, as Honorius reported to his monks. Peter's own later account of Urban's death has him taken ill while changing horses, shortly after Peter had approached him, but also mentions he contracted dysentery on the journey from Verona – an entirely plausible cause of death. The new pope moved the court to Pisa on its way towards Rome. He seems to have been less sympathetic to the Cathedral chapter but made no further decisions before he died at Pisa in December and was succeeded by Pope Clement III.

The delays could only postpone Peter's inevitable defeat. Baldwin used the breathing space to renew his campaign of suspension and excommunication against his opponents, while Honorius, like Peter, remained at the papal court, as he had been ordered to return there by the chapter. However, on 26 January 1188, Clement made a final decision on the matter, which he communicated in a letter to Baldwin. He rebuked the archbishop for his lack of moderation, which tended to undermine the dignity of his office, and for his disobedience, before repeating all of Urban's demands: the new collegiate church was forbidden and the previous situation was to be restored. Baldwin continued his vindictive campaign against the monks, who were imprisoned in their own priory at the cathedral until August 1189, a month after the death of Henry II, when Richard I imposed a resolution.

However, Peter's legal advocacy had suffered a comprehensive defeat, with serious consequences for his reputation. He returned to England. In his later accounts of the issue, he ignored the political and economic issues, portraying it entirely as a failed attempt to remedy the moral abuses of the Canterbury Cathedral chapter.

== Later years ==
=== On crusade ===
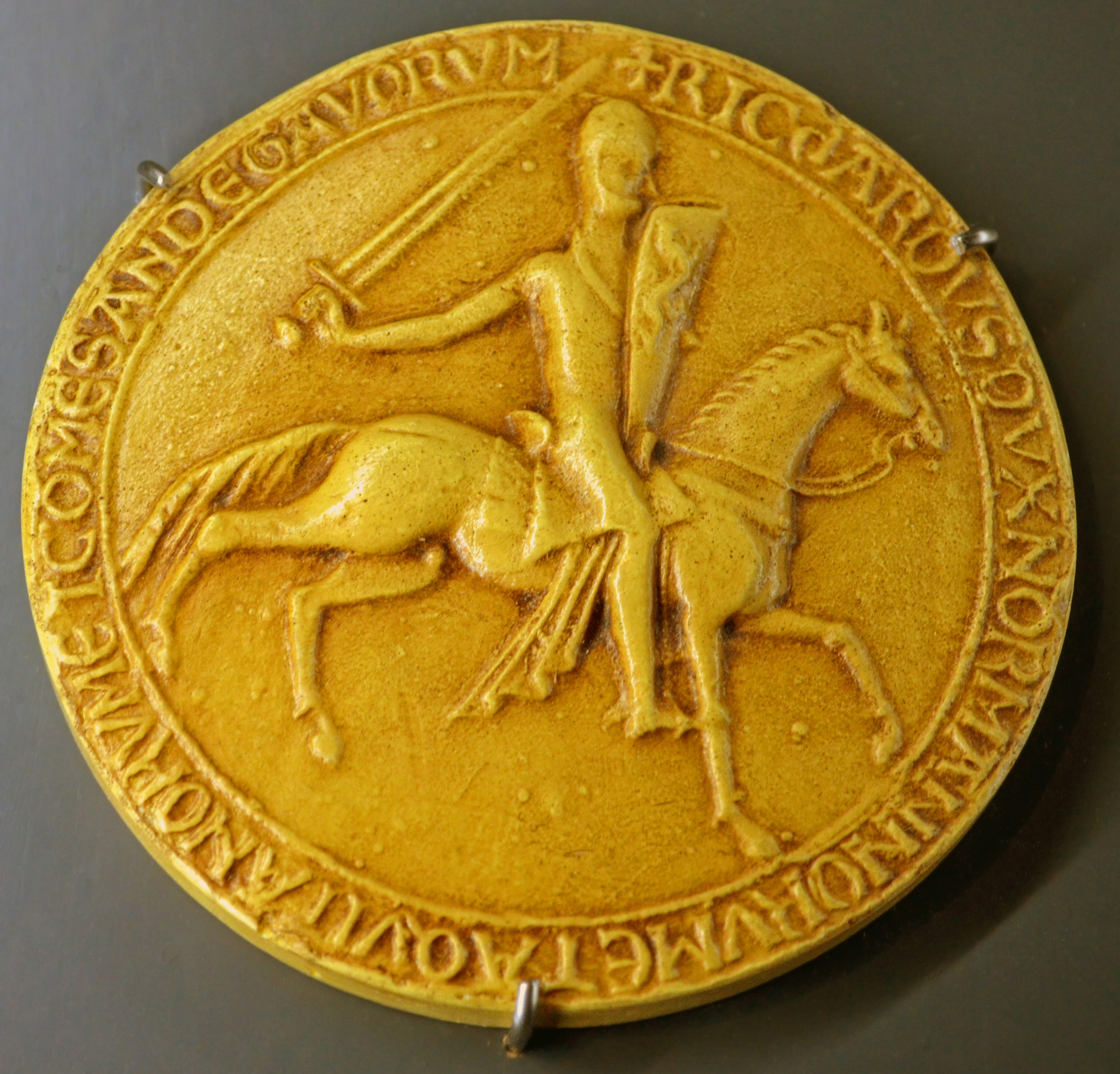
King Richard I's Great Seal of 1189. Exhibited in History Museum of Vendee.

After Henry's death in 1189, Peter seems to have dropped out of favour – perhaps not surprisingly, in view of his outspoken support for the old king. He devoted his energy to propaganda in favour of a new expedition, the Third Crusade, to rescue the Kingdom of Jerusalem after the Battle of Hattin, and to writing a biography of the crusader Raynald of Châtillon.

True to his beliefs, he and Archbishop Baldwin set out for the Holy Land late in 1189, accompanying King Richard as far as Sicily. They pressed on to join the crusaders at Tyre, where Baldwin died on 20 November 1190. Peter found his way back to Sicily. He then probably accompanied Eleanor of Aquitaine on the return journey through Italy and France, finally arriving in England in autumn 1191.

=== Continuing influence and financial difficulties ===
Peter seems to have repaired relations with Eleanor of Aquitaine. Both Bréhier and Kingsford describe Peter as her secretary during the early 1190s. However, Southern merely mentions the three letters he wrote in her name to the Pope protesting against Richard I's detention by Leopold V, Duke of Austria. Southern categorically denies that he was an employee of Eleanor.

When Hubert Walter emerged as Archbishop of Canterbury in 1193, Peter was no longer retained in any formal capacity by the archdiocese, although he was still consulted. He tried to repair relations with the cathedral chapter, claiming Henry II had compelled him to act as he did and that he had been cruelly deceived – a claim that probably met with incredulity. He also continued to exercise considerable influence over other leading churchmen.

Matters eased slightly after Richard's death and both his influence and material fortunes seem to have revived in the early years of John's reign. He was appointed Archdeacon of London by 1202. However, despite still holding a number of potentially lucrative posts, he seems always to have been in financial difficulties. He protested in a letter to Innocent III some time around 1200 that his income from his archdiaconate barely met his basic expenses.

=== The Wolverhampton college affair ===
Although he had probably been dean of Wolverhampton for some time, very likely since the reign of Henry II, the oldest extant evidence of his interest in the collegiate church dates from about 1190. He wrote to William Longchamp, the Chancellor of England and Bishop of Ely to denounce the “tyranny of the Viscount of Stafford” – presumably the Sheriff of Staffordshire – who was, he complained, trampling on the church's ancient privileges and oppressing the townspeople. This is fairly reliably datable, as Longchamp's ascendancy was short-lived, and he was forced to flee the country in 1191. Moreover the sheriff at the time was Hugh Nonant, who was actually the Bishop of Coventry, ally of the regent John and a sworn enemy of Longchamp.

It is probable that decreased political involvement gave Peter more opportunity to take an interest in the affairs of the town and the collegiate church. Moreover, he was taking increasing interest in the spiritual life, particularly of the Cistercians and Carthusians. Peter resolved to deal with what he saw as the venality and nepotism of the canons at Wolverhampton. One of the canons who particularly offended him was Robert of Shrewsbury, who became Bishop of Bangor in 1197, apparently without election, and certainly without resigning his prebend at Wolverhampton. Peter wrote directly to Robert, denouncing his behaviour in strong terms and commending the virtue of apostolic poverty – ironically, in view of his own notorious pluralism.

Peter resigned as dean around 1202, and explained the situation in a letter to Innocent III. He claimed that the church was subject only to the archbishop and the king, under the Pope: later deans were to seek freedom from the archbishop too, with some success. He claimed that the indiscipline of the canons was such that it brought forth hissing and derision from the entire population. The solution he proposed was to replace the institution with a Cistercian abbey. Peter had already put forward the plan to Hubert Walter and won his and John's support for it. Walter dissolved the college and, with Papal approval, John handed over the deanery and prebends to him in January 1203, in preparation for the new venture. A year later, the king granted a charter of liberties for the abbey and endowed it with properties, including the manors of Wolverhampton and Tettenhall. Cistercian monks had already begun to move into the site, although John had appointed one Nicholas as dean on Peter's resignation. However, with the death of Hubert Walter in 1205, the entire project lapsed and John appointed as dean Henry, son of Geoffrey Fitz Peter, 1st Earl of Essex.

== Writings ==
Peter is incorrectly associated with Pseudo-Ingulf's Croyland Chronicle. However, many of his letters and poems are extant. According to Southern, Peter's letters were widely read until the seventeenth century, "for pleasure and instruction by cultivated readers". They conveyed "moral, legal and theological instruction, and ... satire on men and institutions". He was the author of a number of controversial works of varying lengths.

At some time in the 1190s, for example, he wrote Against the Perfidy of the Jews (Latin: Contra perfidiam Judaeorum), which Peter commended in a preface to a Bishop of Worcester, probably John of Coutances. A strongly anti-Jewish work, it is largely a marshalling of arguments, ostensibly from Scripture, in favour of the Doctrine of the Trinity and other specifically Christian teachings, intended as a handbook of argumentation. However, he held out no hope of conversion: "Their hour is not yet come, but He has blinded them till the time when the heathen are converted." Commenting on the Passion of Christ, he denounced the Jews as "persisting in their malice".

Against the Perfidy of the Jews influenced official texts. Its "clamour … is adopted in Papal Bulls, in sermons, monastic chronicles and many other texts …A common vocabulary of speaking about the Jew is developed … just as the period creates a long-lasting stereotype of the Jew".

== Family ==
Peter's brother was William of Blois, another poet, who is sometimes confused with William de Blois, the Bishop of Lincoln. A sister, Christiana of Blois, was a nun, whom Peter encouraged in her vocation.

== Bibliography ==
- Bréhier, Louis René. Herbermann, Charles, ed. (1913). "Peter de Blois". Catholic Encyclopedia. New York: Robert Appleton Company.
- Ferrante, Joan (editor) (2014). Epistolae: Medieval Women's Latin Letters, Columbia University, accessed 23 September 2014.
- Cotts, John D. (2009). The Clerical Dilemma: Peter of Blois and Literate Culture in the Twelfth Century. Washington, DC: Catholic University of America Press.
- Giles, I.A. (1847). Petri Blesensis Bathoniensis archidiaconi opera omnia : nunc primum in Anglia ope codicum manuscriptorum editionumque optimarum, Oxford. The standard collection of the works of Peter of Blois in Latin, in four volumes, available on-line at Internet Archive, accessed 23 September 2014.

- Volume I: Epistolae
- Volume II: Epistolae &c.
- Volume III: Opuscula
- Volume IV: Sermones &c.

- G C Baugh; L W Cowie; J C Dickinson; A P Duggan; A K B Evans; R H Evans; Una C Hannam; P Heath; D A Johnston; Hilda Johnstone; Ann J Kettle; J L Kirby; R Mansfield; A Saltman (1970). M W Greenslade; R B Pugh (eds.). "A History of the County of Stafford: Volume 3". Institute of Historical Research.
- Halsall, Paul (editor) (2011). Internet History Sourcebooks Project, Fordham University, accessed 23 September 2014.
- Kingsford, Charles Lethbridge (1896). "Peter of Blois" . In Lee, Sidney (ed.). Dictionary of National Biography. Vol. 45. London: Smith, Elder & Co.
- Willam Page, ed. (1926). "A History of the County of Kent: Volume 2". Institute of Historical Research.
- Marx, A. (2014): Die Passio Raginaldi von Petrus von Blois: Märtyrertum, Emotionalität und Eschatologie, University of Vienna.
- Robinson, J. A. (1921). "Peter of Blois" in Somerset Historical Essays
- Southern, R.W. "Peter of Blois". Oxford Dictionary of National Biography (online ed.). Oxford University Press. doi:10.1093/ref:odnb/22012. (Subscription, Wikipedia Library access or UK public library membership required.)
- Stubbs, William (1865). Epistolae cantuarienses: the letters of the prior and convent of Christ Church, Canterbury, from A.D. 1187 to A.D. 1199, accessed 29 September 2014 at Internet Archive.
