= William of Blois (poet) =

12th-century poet and writer

- Abbot of Santa Maria della Matina
- Appointed: c. 1167
- Term ended: after 1167

Personal details
- Profession: clergyman and writer

William of Blois (Note: French: Guillaume de Blois; Latin: Gulielmus Blesensis) was a French medieval poet and dramatist. He wrote at least one poetical work, which has not survived, as well as some dramas. Two other works that survive are credited to him, but it is not clear if he was actually the author. He also was an abbot of a monastery in Calabria in southern Italy, after being an unsuccessful candidate for the Bishopric of Catania in Italy.

== Family and early life ==
William was from the Loire Valley, the brother of fellow poet Peter of Blois. While named after the city of Blois, there is no documentary evidence that either brother was born there. The family's origins may have been in Brittany. The family, which also included sisters, was not particularly rich. It was, however, from the nobility, and William was well educated. William moved to the Kingdom of Sicily, either arriving with his brother Peter in September 1166, or shortly afterwards in 1167.

== Writing career ==
William wrote in the 12th century and was the author of at least one work, the Flaura et Marcus, which has not survived. It was written in Latin. He is also credited with two other works that do survive, although his authorship is uncertain. These two works are the Alda, which survives in three manuscripts, and the Iurgia muscae et pulicis, surviving in one manuscript. Both of these other works were also written in Latin. The Alda was modeled closely on the style of Matthew of Vendôme, so much so that it is difficult to distinguish the Alda from Matthew's own works. One of the plotlines of the Alda is the seduction of a woman who is imprisoned by the device of pretending to be a woman.

Some at least of William's works were dramas. William's works are part of a group of works known as the "Latin Elegiac comedies", although other names such as "Latin comedies", "Latin fabliaux", or "Latin comic tales" have also been employed. Major themes were guile, deception, lust and sexual scheming and were produced in elegiac verse modeled on that of Ovid.

== Clerical career ==
In 1167 William was the candidate for the vacant diocese of Catania as the choice of the French party that had come to Sicily in the following of the chancellor Stephen du Perche. He also had the support of the queen, Margaret of Navarre. By November he had definitively lost the election to John of Ajello, candidate of the "xenophobe party" led by Matthew of Ajello.

Around this time, perhaps as compensation for the lost bishopric, William became the abbot of the monastery of Santa Maria della Matina in Calabria. There is some confusion over the name of this abbey, but in letters from his brother Peter, William is referred to as abbas Matinensis or Mathinensis, a name which became emended to Maniacensis (Maniaci) in the Histoire Littéraire de France, which nonetheless correctly identifies the abbey. Although the abbey was Benedictine at the time, as was William, it became Cistercian in 1179/80. While he was still abbot, William received letters from his brother saying that William had not acquired his position in the best manner and urging him to leave Italy and return to France. William agreed to do so, but it is not known if he actually left.

William has been confused in the past with William de Blois, who was Bishop of Lincoln in England and died in 1206. This has since been disproven.
