= History of Worcestershire =

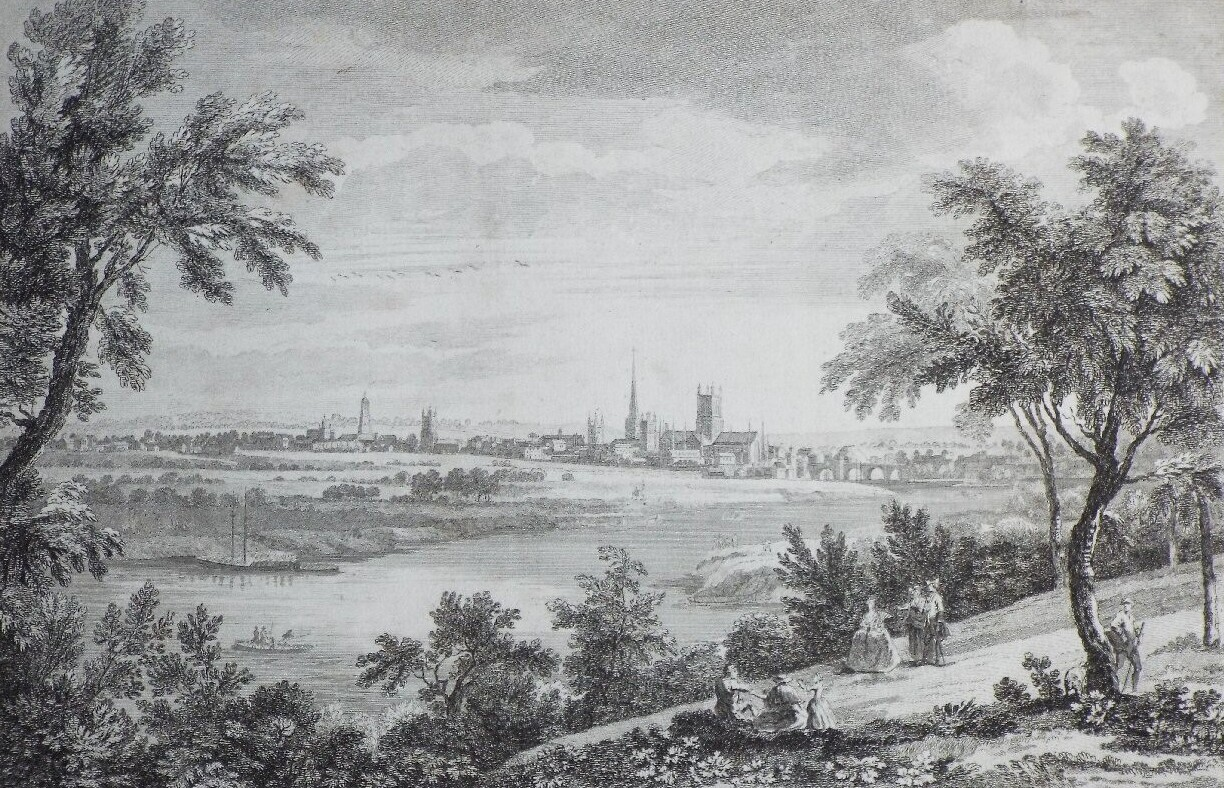
North-west view of Worcester, 1752

The area now known as Worcestershire has had human presence for over half a million years. Interrupted by two ice ages, Worcestershire has had continuous settlement since roughly 10,000 years ago. In the Iron Age, the area was dominated by a series of hill forts, and the beginnings of industrial activity including pottery and salt mining can be found. It seems to have been relatively unimportant during the Roman era, with the exception of the salt workings. During the Anglo-Saxon era, Worcestershire was an important base of Church power and learning. The county as a named political entity dates to this time, being formed in 918.

From the Middle Ages, the role of the city of Worcester becomes particularly important in the county. The city's merchants, Church, aristocracy and gentry become the main power brokers, and tensions between them can be seen. The county had an important role in the English Civil War, being part of the Royalists' front line, and already important for metal working and small arms. It was later the site of Charles II's defeat at the Battle of Worcester in 1651, and local Catholic aristocrats aided his escape. Northern Worcestershire produced a number of prominent religious leaders, many of whom left the Anglican church in the Great Ejection.

The northern part of Worcestershire, including the Dudley and Netherton enclave, was one of the major centres of the British Industrial Revolution. Dudley specialised in iron and coal production, Kidderminster in carpet production, Stourbridge in glass, Bromsgrove and areas of southern Birmingham in nail making, Redditch in needles and fish hooks. Canals and later railways aided export of local goods. Further south, Worcester's glove and porcelain industries became less important than manufacturing. Worcestershire is still important for agriculture, particularly in the Vale of Evesham. Local government reorganisations meant that the Dudley enclave and the King's Norton area of southern Birmingham are no longer in Worcestershire. Other smaller boundary changes have taken some parishes out of the county and added others.

== Prehistory ==
=== Paleolithic ===
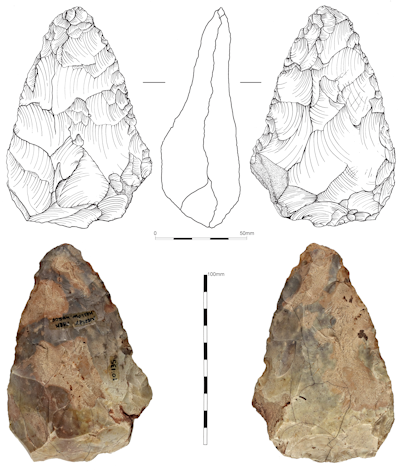
The hand axe discovered in the 1970s in Hallow. Potentially the first Early Middle Palaeolithic artefact from the West Midlands.

There is evidence of human presence in Worcestershire from the Paleolithic period, roughly 700,000–500,000 years ago. Flint axe heads have been found near at Hallow near Worcester, for instance. However, evidence from this period is hard to come by, not least because hunter-gathering societies would roam extensively and not congregate in towns and villages. Tools have mostly been recovered from sand and gravel quarries in the county. The lack of finds appears to be contributing to under-investment in seeking out and preserving them.

The first inhabitants appear to have followed the Bytham River system, which at the time drained eastwards from Evesham to East Anglia. Glaciation pushed settlement back, and humans again appear around 300,000 years ago. Nearly 40 hand axes from this period have been recovered, mostly from near the last glaciation of around 10,000 BC. 15 axes were recovered at Kemerton.

=== Mesolithic ===
Between 10,000 and 3,500 BC, at the start of the current Holocene period, the climate improved. Forests grew, allowing humans to reinhabit the area, again with a hunter-gatherer economy. Settlers of the Mesolithic period are often identified through their use of flint tools, such as the 1,400 fragments found near Kidderminster at Wribbenhall. Other finds included post holes, a hearth, gullies and a pit. This site has been dated to roughly 6,800 BC, making it the oldest settlement yet identified in Worcestershire. Pollen evidence shows that crops were already being grown and woodlands cleared.

=== Neolithic ===
The evidence for the Neolithic period is more extensive. Finds were first located before the Second World War in Bewdley, Lindridge, Broadwas and, at Worcester, a skull. Farming has left many traces, for instance cropmarks on gravel terraces. Settlements can be identified from post holes, for instance at Huntsman's Quarry, Kemerton. However, the most obvious Neolithic evidence comes from their ritual landscape. At Fladbury, a possible cursus has been found, enclosures that may be defined in relationship to changes in the sky and stars. At Whittington Tump a hill has been heightened to make another ceremonial or burial monument.

Stone axes from the Neolithic show extensive trade links, including examples from Brittany and northern Italy or Switzerland, as well as Cornwall, North Wales and the Lake District. Pottery finds also start in this period. Finds at Clifton, Severn Stoke, include Grooved ware pottery, axes, and burnt stones used to heat water for cooking or possibly a sauna.

=== Bronze Age ===
Bronze Age finds include weapons come from Worcestershire's valleys especially near potential fordable river crossings on the Avon such as Harvington, Evesham and Defford, and on the Severn, Bewdley, Holt, Worcester, Kempsey and Pixham. Flint axes, arrowheads, and flakes found in the Malvern area are attributed to early Bronze Age settlers. Burial sites are also important sources of information about the Bronze Age. Around twenty barrows have been found in the county and two have been excavated, at Holt and Wyre Piddle.

Worcestershire changed during the Bronze Age to a predominantly agricultural landscape. Peat evidence from near Bredon Hill and Birlingham in the Avon area shows that it was cleared by the earlier part of the period. A lack of cereal grain finds has been interpreted as indicating that the land was used for cattle farming. The clearance of forest land is also evidenced by alluvium deposits on the lower lands in the county, caused by river flooding. A move towards open settlements may be detected as the lands became more fully occupied.

Current field systems may date from the later Bronze Age. For instance, the evidence at Kerton and Wyre Piddle shows a relationship between the Bronze Age boundaries and contemporary fields. The "Shire Ditch", a late Bronze Age boundary earthwork possibly dates from around 1000 BC, its boundary being respected by later settlement patterns. Similarly, Roman field boundaries seem to have kept their alignment with a Bronze Age boundary at Childswickham.

Bronze Age evidence also shows bronze casting and textiles at Kemerton.

=== Iron Age ===
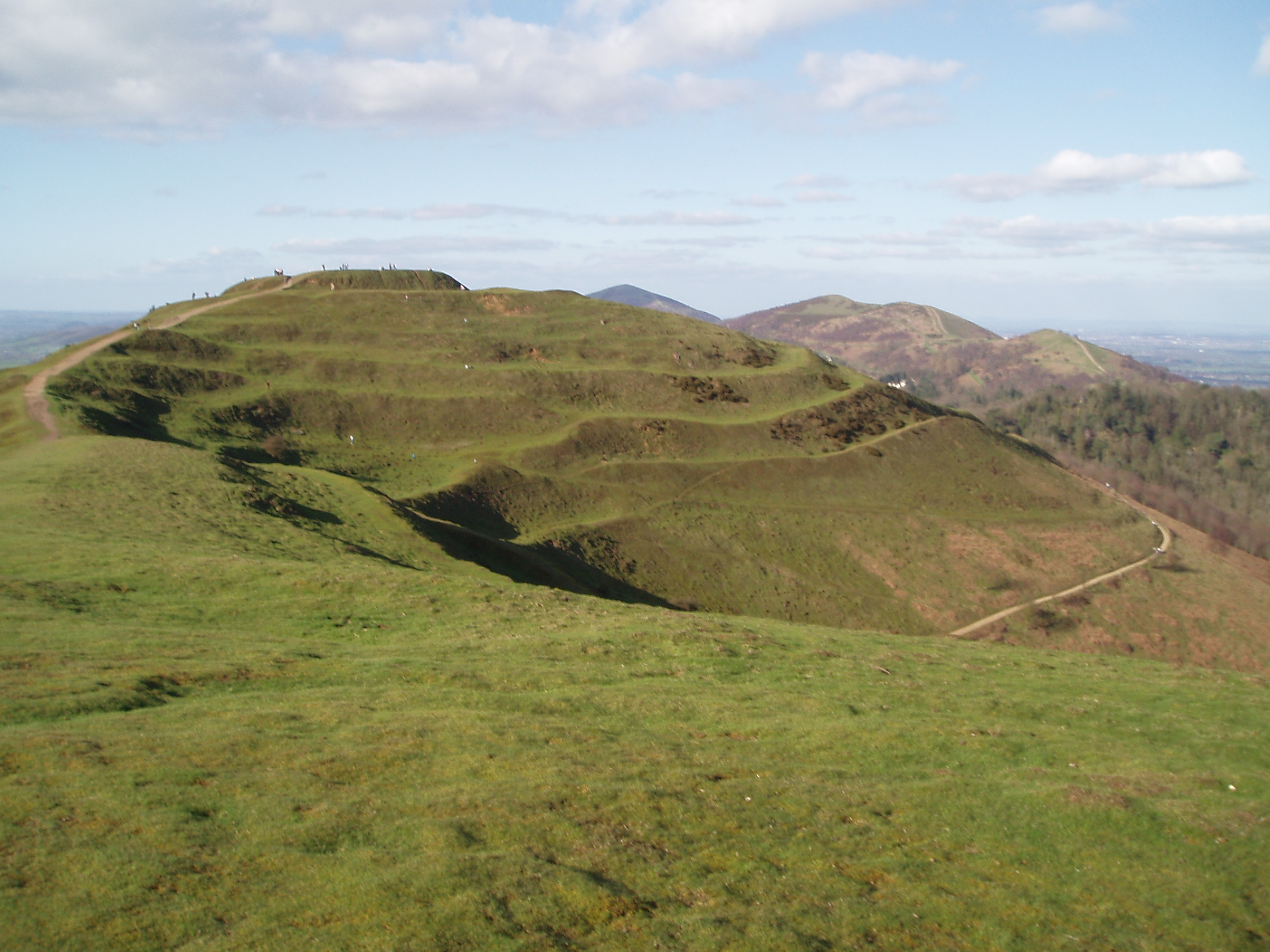
Iron Age earthworks, British Camp

From around 600BC, Iron Age became the predominant technology, being harder than bronze and easy to manipulate into many tools. In Worcestershire, the most visible reminder of the period is hill forts. There around ten or twelve extant, including British Camp, Wychbury Hill and Hanbury. The full list may include east of the Severn Bredon Hill, Conderton Camp, and Headless Cross; and west of the Severn, Woodbury Hill, Berrow Hill Camp and Gadbury Bank (Note: Also mentioned by Bowen are Wychbury Camp, which is now in Birmingham, and Garmsley Hill Fort, now in Herefordshire.) (Note: A hut circle was found at Hanbury's hill fort, just south of the current churchyard. The presence of a large number of huts cut into the rock at British Camp has also been found.)

A promontory fort can be found by the Severn at Kempsey. Many are visible to each other, suggesting that they were centres of organisation and power. Their functions may have included meeting places, a means to control livestock, grain storage, residences and tribal centres.

Farming in the period shows a mixture of settlements lasting long periods, but not being fully stable and permanent. The middle of the period seems to be marked by the abandonment of both farms and hill forts. However, there is also continuity between this period and the Roman occupation.

The Wyche Cutting, a pass through the Malvern hills, was in use during the Iron Age as part of the salt route from Droitwich to South Wales. A 19th-century discovery of over two hundred metal money bars near the Wyche cutting has been said to suggest that the Malvern area had been inhabited by the La Tène people around 250 BC.

Evidence of Iron Age salt production has been found at Droitwich itself. A pottery industry exporting into the surrounding area began in the Malvern area, continuing into the Middle Ages. (Note: The Malvern pottery industry began in the late Bronze Age)

== Roman ==
A period of client state relations, with tributes and political arrangements being made between the Roman Empire and Celtic Britons preceded the invasion. Caesar attempted it and Augustus planned to the same. Emperor Claudius successfully conquered Britain in a campaign starting in 43AD.

Excavations at Midsummer Hill fort, Bredon Hill, and Conderton Camp all show evidence of violent destruction around the year 48 AD. This may suggest that British Camp was also abandoned or destroyed around the same time. (Note: Ancient folklore has it that the British chieftain Caractacus made his last stand against the Romans at the British Camp, a site of extensive Iron Age earthworks on a summit of the Malvern Hills close to where Malvern was to be later established. The story remains disputed, however, as Roman historian Tacitus implies a site closer to the river Severn. There is, therefore, no evidence that Roman presence ended the prehistoric settlement at British Camp.)

Worcestershire was quickly behind Roman front lines. This means that there is little evidence of Roman military presence in the county, excepting some ten small road defences, such as one near Kempsey that appears to have belonged to the Roman Second Legion Augusta, headquartered at Isca Augusta, Caerleon in South Wales. (Note: Their presence is shown by an inscription found at the four-acre site, stating To the Emperor Flavius Valerius Constatinus, pious, fortunate, unconquerable, Augustus.) There are also bridge remains over the Severn near Kempsey which have been attributed to the Romans.

Two forts have been found at Dodderhill next to the Droitwich salt workings. A villa or other high-profile building with mosaics has also been found here in 1847 during the construction of the canal and railway. There is evidence for Roman industrial production such as iron works in Worcester, but no sign of municipal buildings, although a small defended site has been detected, perhaps to guard the river crossing.

Excavations at Kings Norton found signs of a small Romano-British settlement, including kilns for pottery manufacture, and more recently Roman pottery and a Roman ditch at Parsons Hill, near Icknield Street.

Worcestershire as a whole does not seem to have been prominent in the villa system, except in its south eastern corner, near the Cotswolds, where Romanised agriculture was deeply established. Worcestershire was also not on the network of major Roman roads, although a number of roads have been detected.

== Anglo-Saxon ==
The Roman administrative system appears to have disappeared swiftly after the withdrawal of their troops. However, Worcestershire probably remained Romano-British in cultural, linguistic and religious terms. There is little archaeological evidence. There appears to have been farming activity in Worcester, such as a few farmhouses and evidence for grazing at Deansway. There is evidence that St Helen's Church in Worcester could have had a British origin. Salt workings in Droitwich appear to have continued.

=== Kingdom of the Hwicce ===
The conquest of the area by Anglo-Saxons appears to have been relatively late. Gloucester and Bath were taken around 577 by the West Saxons at the Battle of Deorham. In 613, the Battle of Chester pushed the Welsh beyond the River Dee. In these early years, it is possible that very minor kingdoms or fiefdoms were established, for instance of the Weorgoran, from which it is believed Worcester takes its name.

The area now known as Worcestershire was part of the early English kingdom of the Hwicce, which was quickly made subordinate to Mercia. The exact boundaries of their kingdom are uncertain, but it is likely that they coincided with those of the old Diocese of Worcester. The kingdom would, therefore, have included Worcestershire except for its northwestern tip. The toponym Hwicce survives in Worcestershire in the names of Wichenford, Wychbury Hill and Droitwich.

=== Diocese of Worcester ===
The diocese was founded in 679–680, and early bishops bore the title Episcopus Hwicciorum. The diocese seems to have benefited in the 8th century from the support of the kings of Mercia. Through royal support the bishopric was able to gradually extend its control over prominent minsters. Initially, these were under the control of Hwiccan royals, as family property. This appears to have been gradually transferred to the control of the Bishopric, under the sponsorship of the Mercian kings, the process driven by the self-interest of the Mercian monarchy. As well as undermining local rivals through this process, the Mercian kings also derived revenue from church lands in this period.

Consequently, in the 9th century, the bishopric of Worcester can be seen to be the most powerful ecclesiastical power in Mercia during this time. From this position the church was able to use its great wealth to buy privileges from the kings of Mercia.

Later in the period it was from Mercia, in particular Worcester, that King Alfred began to recruit priests and monks with whom to rebuild the church in Wessex during the 880s (Asser, ch. 77). It has been argued that these priests brought with them a new attitude towards the church's place within society and its relationship with the monarchy. Consequently, from the bishopric of Worcester there developed a new ecclesiastical ideology that would become the accepted Anglo-Saxon church.

The chaos of the period 900–1060 led to the loss of ecclesiastical lands, through leases and loss of records. Leases were often made for three lifetimes, but tended to become permanent arrangements. The result was that by Domesday, some 45% of the diocese's church lands were held by tenants under leases.

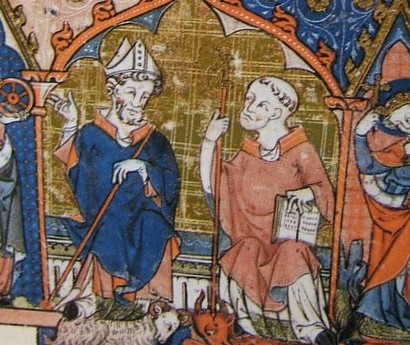
Oswald and Eadnoth

Worcester was a centre of monastic learning and church power. Oswald of Worcester was an important reformer, appointed Bishop in 961, jointly with York. The last Anglo-Saxon Bishop of Worcester, Wulfstan, or St Wulstan, was also an important reformer, and stayed in post until his death in 1095.

=== Alfred and Edward ===
Worcestershire was absorbed into the unified Kingdom of England in 927, when it was also first constituted as a county. It was a separate ealdormanship briefly in the 10th century before forming part of the Earldom of Mercia in the 11th century. In the years leading up to the Norman conquest in 1066, the Church, including the Priory Cathedral, Evesham Abbey, Pershore Abbey, Fladbury, Malvern Priory and other religious houses, increasingly dominated the county. (Note: Monastic foundations existed at Worcester, Evesham, Pershore and Fladbury in the 8th century; and at Great Malvern in the ninth century.)

During King Alfred's reign, the earls of Mercia fortified Worcester "for the protection of all the people" at the request of Bishop Werfrith. It appears that maintenance of the defences was to be paid for by the townspeople. A unique document detailing this and privileges granted to the church also outlines the existence of Worcester's market and borough court, differentiation between church and market quarters within the city, as well as the role of the King in relation to the roads.

Worcester's fortifications would most likely have established the line of the wall that was extant until the 1600s, perhaps excepting the south-east area near the former castle (see Worcester city walls). It is referred to as a wall by contemporaries, so may have been of stone.

Worcester became the focus of tax resistance against the Danish Harthacanute. Two huscarls were killed in May 1041 while attempting to collect taxes for the expanded navy, after being driven into the priory, where they were murdered. A military force was sent to deal with the non-payment, while the townspeople attempted to defend themselves by moving to and occupying the island of Bevere, two miles up the river, where they were then besieged. After Harthacnut's men had sacked the city and set it alight, agreement was reached.

The last Anglo-Saxon sheriff of the county was Cyneweard of Laughern.

== Medieval ==
=== Economic development ===
During the Middle Ages, much of the county's economy was based on the wool trade, and many areas of its dense forests, such as Feckenham Forest, Horewell Forest, Ombersley, Wyre Forest and Malvern Chase, were royal hunting grounds. Droitwich Spa, being situated on large deposits of salt, was a centre of salt production from Roman times, with one of the principal Roman roads running through the town.

Farming in the early Middle Ages tended to increase production through expanding the area of land cultivated, particularly from the forested and waste areas. Surplus production was quite limited, especially after feudal dues were given or paid, leaving peasant farmers making only slightly more than subsistence levels in most of the county. Poor harvests in 1315, 1316 and 1322 pushed food prices up and probably weakened the population's resistance to disease. The Black Death arrived in Worcestershire in 1348–9. Outbreaks in 1361, 1369 and 1375 together reduced the population by around a third, as in other parts of England. Some villages were abandoned entirely, sometimes leaving churches alone with no supporting settlement.

The Priory Cathedral was a major landowner and economic force, both in Worcester and the county. The Church and other monastic communities together controlled more than half of the land in Worcestershire, a particularly high proportion. The Priory's properties for instance included the priory manor of Bromsgrove after it was donated by Henry III. It was a centre of learning and provided schooling. It was associated with hospitals. The Church received a portion of local taxations and ecclesiastical law applied to Christian morals and could result in punishments. It had close political associations with leading gentry and aristocracy. As such, Worcester's Cathedral had a central role in the medieval life of the city and county. In the early medieval period, as the settled areas of the country expanded into the more wooded areas in the north and west, the church was able to increase its share of the wealth of Worcestershire, as it dominated the newly settled areas that brought in new income, such as settlements at Kempsey, Wick Episcopi, Hanbury, Hartlebury, Wolverley and Inkberrow.

The cathedral was one of a number of religious institutions in Worcester. Rivalry between the different religious orders sometimes resulted in disorder, including on occasion, removing dead bodies when the right to bury a prominent person was disputed. Sponsorship of the differing orders also reflected family interests, with particular families having strong associations with specific orders. This was also true in the county as a whole.

The Droitwich salt-industry was very important at the time of the Domesday Survey, Bromsgrove alone sending 300 cartloads of wood yearly to the salt-works. In the 13th and 14th centuries Bordesley monastery and the abbeys of Evesham and Pershore exported wool to the Florentine and Flemish markets. Coal and iron were mined at Dudley from the 13th century, coal since at least 1292.

=== Norman Conquest ===
The first Norman Sheriff of Worcestershire, Urse d'Abetot oversaw the construction of a new castle at Worcester, although nothing now remains of the castle. Worcester Castle was in place by 1069, its outer bailey built on land that had previously been the cemetery for the monks of the Worcester cathedral chapter. The motte of the castle overlooked the river, just south of the cathedral.

Worcester's Bishop Wulfstan was the last Anglo-Saxon bishop in England.

=== Land ownership and administration after the conquest ===
==== Church lands ====
After the Norman Conquest of England; the Domesday Book noted in 1086 that in seven of the twelve hundreds covering Worcestershire, the Crown had no authority. The Crown's authority was replaced by the Bishop of Worcester and the Abbots at Pershore, Westminster and Evesham.

At this time, more than half of Worcestershire was in the hands of the church. The church of Worcester held the triple hundred of Op.waldslow, with such privileges as to exclude the sheriff's jurisdiction entirely, the profits of all the local courts accruing to the bishop, whose bailiffs in 1276 claimed to hold his hundred outside Worcester, at Dryhurst, and at Wimborntree. The two hundreds owned by the church of Westminster, and that owned by Pershore, had in the 13th century been combined to form the hundred of Pershore, while the hundred of Evesham owned by Evesham Abbey had been converted into Blackenhurst hundred; and the irregular boundaries and outlying portions of these hundreds are explained by their having been formed out of the scattered endowments of their ecclesiastical owners. Of the remaining Domesday hundreds, Came, Clent, Cresselaw and Esch had been combined to form the hundred of Halfshire by the 13th century, while Doddingtree remained unchanged. The shire-court was held at Worcester.

==== Distribution of lands to Normans ====
William the Conqueror gave to his allies and friends manors and parishes captured from the Anglo-Saxons. According to the Domesday Book; King William gave Dudley and other manors such as Selly Oak, Bartley Green, Northfield, Frankley, and Bromsgrove (Willingwick) to Ansculf de Picquigny - Sheriff of Buckinghamshire, and Hala to Roger de Montgomerie, who became Earl of Shrewsbury. Whilst Doddingtree Hundred was gifted to Raoul II of Tosny, seigneur de Conches-en-Ouche, Ranulph de Mortimer, and Osbern Fitz Richard. Despite the Norman Conquest; the rest of the county was still held by the Abbeys of Pershore and Evesham, the Bishop of Worcester and Priory - these hundreds became known as Oswaldslow and Fisseberge (latterly Blakenhurst), along with the unnamed hundreds of Pershore and Westminster.

The first Norman Sheriff Urse d'Abetot, built the castle of Worcester and seized much church land, some of which became part of the Crown's hundreds in Worcestershire - Dimidii Comitatus de Wych (which became known as Halfshire) and Doddingtree. d'Abetot was in dispute with Bishop Wulfstan over the rights of the sheriff in the lands of Oswaldslow, and Blakenhurst. Meanwhile, in Halfshire; landowners in Alvechurch, Hanbury, and Inkberrow handed over their manors to the church, effectively transferring jurisdiction to Oswaldslow.

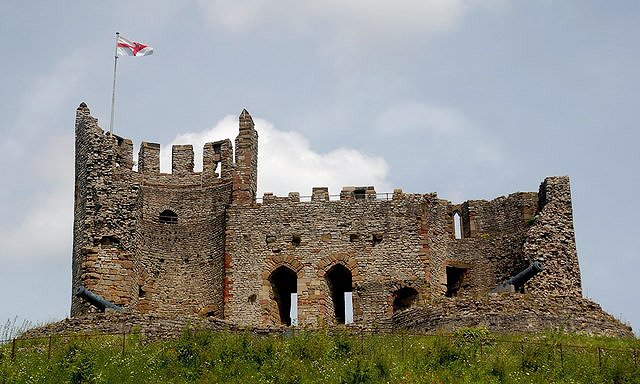
Dudley Castle

The vast possessions of the church prevented the growth of a great territorial aristocracy in Worcestershire, and Dudley Castle, which passed from William Fitz-Ansculf to the families of Paynel and Somen, was the sole residence of a feudal baron. The Domesday fief of Urse d'Abitot the sheriff, founder of Worcester Castle, and of his brother Robert le Despenser passed in the 12th century to the Beauchamps, who owned Elmley and Hanley Castles. The possessions of William Fitz Osbern in Doddingtree hundred and the Teme valley fell to the crown after his rebellion in 1074 and passed to the Mortimers. Hanley Castle and Malvern Chase were granted by Henry III. to Gilbert de Clare, with exemption from the sheriff's jurisdiction.

==== Beauchamp Sheriffs of Worcestershire ====
The position of the Sheriff of Worcestershire was hereditary, one of only three to remain so. The Beauchamp family held it, and were therefore responsible for aspects of the law, some military duties and tax collection. They were obliged to pay fixed amounts of tax revenue to the Crown, and in addition frequently held Royal Forests, including Feckenham, in return for a payment, or "farm". This led to significant corruption and abuse. In the 1200s Walter de Beauchamp (justice) and his son William (III) de Beauchamp extracted taxes to their own benefit, ensuring that little or no money due to the Crown was paid to it. Walter de Beauchamp was removed from office in 1229, but reinstated within a year. No money was paid in 1224-8 and none from 1229 to 1235, including arrears.

After William (III) de Beauchamp inherited the position, the farm of Feckenham Forest was unpaid for 12 years to 1242, and unpaid sums from his Walter's time also remained unpaid. William used powers of assize to harass free tenants in the Doddingtree hundred, who agreed to pay a large annual fine to stop this activity. An inquest in 1274-5 found that he had "appropriated" Doddingtree and Halfshire hundreds, which had been achieved by using his officials to harass the residents. He ran a long dispute with the Bishop Walter de Cantilupe, resulting in the Pope backing William's excommunication for abusing church rights over the liberty of Oswaldslaw, which in turn pushed Henry III to support de Beauchamp over the church. The excommunication was lifted in 1251 by the bishop. A settlement allowed the church to retain its rights, in return for a payment for the income that would be lost to the Crown, but poor wording of the agreement allowed de Beauchamp to continue the dispute until 1258.

By the end of his life, William (III) de Beauchamp had agreed to pay the Crown £10 a year to clear the debts from unpaid revenues and farms. However, these payments proved insufficient and continued to be paid by his son after his death. Historian Emma Mason regards it as remarkable that the de Beauchamp family's abuses were tolerated by the Crown, and that the hereditary nature of Worcestershire's Sherriffs was not abolished as it had been elsewhere.

=== King Stephen ===
The nineteen-year conflict between King Stephen and Empress Matilda over the English crown had impacts in Worcestershire. Matilda's brother was the Earl of Gloucester, placing Worcester close to one of her most powerful allies. As war broke out in 1138, Stephen attacked Dudley Castle, held by Ralf Pagenal, allied to the Empress. Stephen ravaged the surrounding countryside but could not take the castle. In Easter 1139, Stephen made a royal visit to Worcester and made offerings at the cathedral. Around this time he also created the Earldom of Worcester, giving the title to Waleran de Beaumont, a close ally.

In 1140, Empress Matilda's allies were in Gloucester, while she was under siege in Oxford. Rumours of an imminent attack on Worcester by Matilda's allies drove Worcester's citizens to take refuge in the cathedral. The attack came in November. Worcester's citizens repulsed the attack at the castle, but houses were burnt, prisoners taken for ransom and livestock stolen. Waleran attacked Sudeley Castle and Tewkesbury in revenge.

Miles of Gloucester, the Sheriff, sided with the Empress. He was rewarded with the title of Earl of Hereford. Stephen made the grandson of Urse d'Abitot William de Beauchamp Sheriff in his place. He was put in charge of Worcester's castle in 1145, and Waleran went on a pilgrimage to Palestine.

In 1150, Waleran sided with Matilda and defended Worcester against attack by Stephen. Worcester was burnt and plundered, this time by King Stephen, when he took the city. The war came to an end in 1153, with Stephen agreeing that Matilda's heir would succeed him, in return for peace.

=== Henry II ===
Henry II restored his authority in the Marches early after his coronation, particularly acting against Roger, Earl of Hereford and Hugh de Mortimer in Shropshire. He visited Worcester and was ceremonially crowned (that is, wore his crown in public) twice in the city. At Easter 1158, one of these occasions, he held a Royal Council at the city.

Henry II implemented a number of administrative and legal reforms. He reorganised the English judicial system, implementing circuits, where judges would visit courts in turn. Worcestershire, Shropshire, Herefordshire and Gloucestershire formed one of these.

Henry II's dispute with Thomas Becket reached Worcester as the Bishop Roger attempted to support Becket and the independence of the Church. He wrote to the King to intercede on behalf of Becket after his exile, which provoked Henry to instruct him to keep away from Becket in his exile. Roger ignored the instruction, and was in turn exiled. He remained in exile, despite attempts by the Pope to reconcile him with Henry, and eventually was sent to Rome by the King after Becket's murder to attempt to convince the Pope that he was not involved.

=== Richard I ===
Worcester received its first royal charter from Richard I in 1189. This set out the annual payment made to the Crown as £24 per annum, and set out that the city would deal directly with the Crown's Exchequer, rather than through the county sheriff, who would no longer have general jurisdiction over the city.

=== King John ===
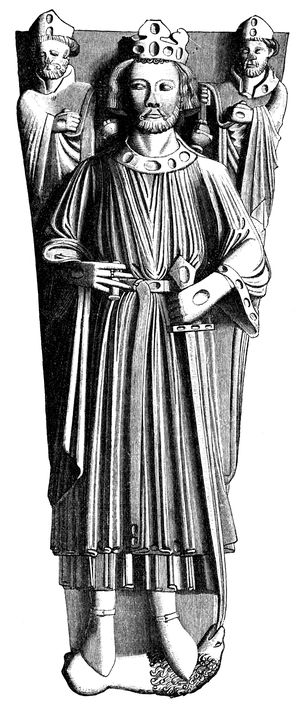
John's tomb, Worcester Cathedral

King John made eleven visits to Worcester, including at his first Easter as King in 1200. Wulfstan was made a saint in 1203, and John visited his shrine in 1207. He appears to have developed an attachment to Wulfstan's cult because he appeared to support the authority of kings. However, despite John's apparent attachment to the city, its charter was not renewed, which allowed him to levy increasing and arbitrary taxation (tallage) on Worcester.

John attempted to claim the right to appoint English bishops, which led him into a long dispute with the Pope. Bishop Mauger of Worcester was appointed by the Pope to enforce his Interdict, alongside the Bishops of London and Ely. He was forced into exile and his possessions confiscated as a result.

John spent Christmas 1214 at Worcester, during his disputes with the Barons over the administration of justice, before returning to London where discussions leading to Magna Carta began. In 1216, the barons asked the French Dauphin to depose John. This brought conflict to Worcestershire, where the county 's leaders organised against him, and allowed William Marshall, son of the Earl of Pembroke, who was loyal to John, to take possession of Worcester as governor. Ranulph, Earl of Chester attacked the city, took the castle and ransacked the cathedral, where the garrison had attempted to take shelter. Marshal was warned of the attack by his father, and was able to escape.

The priory was fined for protecting the rebels and were forced to melt down the treasures used to adorn St Wulfstan's tomb. The city of Worcester was fined £100 for its role, a fine which he could impose due to the lack of a city charter.

John was buried in the cathedral near Wulfstan's altar after he died.

=== The diocese and Worcester's Jewry ===
Worcester had a small Jewish population by the late 12th century. It was one of a number of places allowed to keep records of debts, in an official locked chest known as an archa. (An archa or arca (plural archae/arcae) was a municipal chest in which deeds were preserved.) Jewish life probably centred around what is now Copenhagen Street.

The diocese was notably hostile to the Jewish community in Worcester. Peter of Blois was commissioned by a Bishop of Worcester, probably John of Coutances, to write a significant anti-Judaic treatise Against the Perfidy of Jews around 1190.

William de Blois, as Bishop of Worcester, imposed particularly strict rules on Jews within the diocese in 1219. As elsewhere in England, Jews were officially compelled to wear square white badges, supposedly representing tabulae. In most places, this requirement was relinquished as long as fines were paid. In addition to enforcing the church laws on wearing badges, Blois tried to impose additional restrictions on usury, and wrote to Pope Gregory in 1229 to ask for better enforcement and further, harsher measures. In response, the Papacy demanded that Christians be prevented from working in Jewish homes, "lest temporal profit be preferred to the zeal of Christ", and enforcement of the wearing of badges.

=== Henry III ===
Henry III made a gift of the manor of Bromsgrove to Worcester Priory, to support its memorial of his father King John.

A national assembly of Jewish notables was summoned to Worcester by the Crown in 1240 to assess their wealth for taxation; at which Henry III "squeezed the largest tallage of the thirteenth century from his Jewish subjects".

Henry III was embroiled in disputes with his Barons for a great deal of his reign. In the 1260s, this broke out into war. In 1263 Worcester's Jewish residents were attacked by a baronial force led by Robert Earl Ferrers and Henry de Montfort. Most were killed. Ferrers used this opportunity to remove the titles to his debts by taking the archae.

The massacre in Worcester was part of a wider campaign by the De Montforts and their allies in the run-up to the Second Barons' War, aimed at undermining Henry III. A massacre of London's Jewry also took place during the war. Worcestershire was the site of the Battle of Evesham in which Simon de Montfort was killed on 4 August 1265, effectively ending any hope for his allies of winning the war. (Note: Simon de Montfort had previously been engaged in a campaign of persecution of Jewish communities in Leicester.)

A few years later, in 1275, the Jews that were still living in Worcester were forced to move to Hereford, as they were expelled from all towns under the jurisdiction of the queen mother.

=== Worcestershire in Parliament ===
As early as 1295 Worcestershire was represented by sixteen members in Parliament, returning two knights for the shire and two burgesses each for the city of Worcester and the boroughs of Bromsgrove, Droitwich, Dudley, Evesham, Kidderminster and Pershore. With the exception of Droitwich, however, which was represented until 1311 and again recovered representation in 1554, the boroughs ceased to make returns. Evesham was re-enfranchised in 1604, and in 1606 Bewdley returned one member. Under the Reform Act 1832 the county returned four members in two divisions; Droitwich lost one member; Dudley and Kidderminster were re-enfranchised, returning one member each. In 1867 Evesham lost one member.

== Early modern ==
=== Industrial and agricultural change ===
In the 16th century, the Worcestershire clothing industry gave employment to 8000 people. The clothing industry declined in the 17th century, but the silk-manufacture later replaced it at Kidderminster and Blockley.

Henry VIII confined cloth making to Bromsgrove, Kidderminster, Droitwich, Evesham and Worcester. Rural production of cloth had been spurred by rural poverty and the need to supplement incomes. Trade in Worcester and the cloth trade in Kidderminster was still controlled by guilds. Fulling (cleaning new cloth) around Worcester and dyeing in the Teme valley, for instance in Tenbury and Clifton, were major employers. Rope making was prominent around Bromsgrove. However, tanning was probably the largest single industry across the county, concentrated near rivers and streams in the north and west of the county.

Glassmaking was first established in Stourbridge in the early 1600s, by Hugeonot emigres. Sir Robert Mansell's obtaining a national monopoly on glass production was pivotal in using the local clay to make glass pots, and greatly expanded the local industry, which began manufacturing window panes as well as bottles and pots. Glass manufacturers were instructed in 1615 to use coal for fuel, as woodlands were increasingly under pressure, and timber needed for shipbuilding as well as fuel.

The northern part of the county was already known for metalwork, but was still dependent on small furnaces powered by hand bellows for iron production until shortly before the Civil War, when charcoal furnaces using water powered bellows began to be introduced. Smithies were generally owned by landowners and leased to smiths, who were not organised into guilds, unlike their counterparts in Coventry. This freedom from price and production control may in part explain the industry's sudden growth in the seventeenth century, which caused rivalry with guilds in London who attempted to stop the flow of Midlands goods into their markets. The greatest benefits of the trade accrued to ironmasters who purchased goods from the local producers for sale onwards.

Efforts to make iron with coal began in Dudley in the early 1600s, described in Dud Dudley's 1665 book Metallum martis, although these were likely less successful than he depicted.

Nailmaking established itself in the northern parts of the county, such as Bromsgrove, Stourbridge and Dudley. Like other metal trades, it served as a way to supplement otherwise low rural incomes, and then replaced other labouring work for many. It grew in part because of the access that the Severn river gave to national and international markets, alongside the local production of iron. Again the nailmasters, who resold nails into the markets beyond the county gained the most from this trade, which even in this period was low paid and exploited.

Scythe making concentrated in the Clent Hills area as water power was needed to make them. It was a skilled process, and Scythe makers could be quite wealthy.

The period also saw many changes to agriculture. For instance, tobacco was grown in Worcestershire in the Eckington and Evesham areas. There were 17 growers in 1627, when it was banned after pressure from colonial producers. Tobacco continued to be grown illegally through most of the rest of the century. The potato, on the other hand, while introduced to the country, was not widely cultivated. In the north east, grain production began to increase, as well as pasture of cattle and sheep, which grew by 50% in Belbroughton, Bromsgrove and Chaddesley Corbett in the 1600s. Other innovations included the promotion of clover was by Andrew Yarranton of Astley in 1663.

Hops may also have been introduced to Worcestershire around this period. Flax and hemp, vital to the cloth trade, were grown, as was woad, for dyeing. The county grew extensive fruit crops, especially apples and pears, but also plums, cherries, other soft fruits and vines. Cider and perry production also thrived. Mulberries were encouraged by James I and Charles II as a prelude to introducing a silk industry, supporting silk-manufacture later established at Kidderminster and Blockley. Market gardening also developed in the period, especially in the Evesham area.

=== Reformation ===
Worcester Priory came to an end with King Henry VIII's dissolution of the monasteries. Shortly beforehand, in 1535, the prior William More resigned, and was replaced by Henry Holbeach. More had a reputation for fine living, although his standards seem in line with other senior ecclesiasts of the time. However, there certainly were problems with the administration of the priory, including divisions within the community.

The Protestant Hugh Latimer was bishop from 1535, and preached for reform and iconoclasm. He resigned as bishop in 1539, as a result of a theological turn by Henry VIII towards Roman Catholicism, in the Six Articles. John Bell, a moderate reformer, was bishop from 1539 to 1543, during the period of the priory's dissolution.

In the early 16th century, Worcester had around 40 monks. This declined slightly in the years immediately before 1540, as recruitment seems to have halted. There were 35 Benedictine monks plus the Prior Holbeach at the time of dissolution, probably 16 January 1540; eleven were immediately given pensions, while the remainder became secular canons in the new Royal College. Holbeach was re-appointed as the first Dean. A further five former monks were pensioned from the college in July 1540.

The abolition of the monasteries caused a major reorganisation of the educational system for young people, mostly sons of gentry, who were given Latin and grammar schooling through monastic schools up until this point. The Royal Grammar School, Worcester claims descent from one of these. King Henry set up replacement grammar schools, often still provided in close association with the Church. King's School, Worcester is one of these.

The former monastic library of Worcester Priory contained a considerable number of manuscripts which are, among other libraries, now scattered over Cambridge, London (British Library), Oxford Bodleian, and the Cathedral library at Worcester of today. Remains of the priory dating from the 12th and 13th centuries can still be seen. John Bell's successor as bishop, Nicholas Heath, was religiously much more conservative and Catholic. The records from the dissolution give detail about other religious houses in Worcestershire.

While the estates of Worcester Priory were transferred to the Chapter and Dean, others were sold off. Many establishments were ransacked, and little was left when the buildings were sold. The estates were often sold to people connected at court, including Sir John Packington who bought 30 manors in Worcestershire, forming the basis for his estate including Hampton Lovett and Chaddesley Corbett where his descendants built Harvington Hall. Nevertheless, changes in land ownership in Worcestershire were less than in other areas.

Although Roman Catholicism was officially abolished, a number of Worcestershire's aristocratic families remained Catholic. Several were involved in the Gunpowder Plot in 1604. Some Worcestershire houses have priest holes that survive from the 16th and 17th centuries (for example Harvington Hall has seven).

The reformation also brought change to rural customs, feasts and fairs, which became gradually more detached from religious significance. As Puritanism rose as a social force in the 1620s and 30s, village sports and activities such as Maypole and Morris dancing came under attack, for instance from legislation in the 1620s. Worcester raised funds to keep players out of the city in 1632 and 1634. These activities did however gain a revival after the restoration.

=== Gunpowder Plot ===
Robert Wintour and other conspirators devised a plan to blow up the new Scottish Protestant King James I at the Wintour's home at Huddington Court. Robert Catesby, the main figure behind the Gunpowder Plot, was from Northampton, but most of the plotters were from Worcestershire's Catholic families.

=== Charles I ===
After 1629, Charles I attempted to rule without Parliament. This forced him to raise taxes and other revenues, which had a number of impacts on Worcestershire. The sale of royal lands, particularly forests, led to attempts to enclose Malvern Chase and the more successful sale of Feckenham Forest in the 1630s, which in both cases had led to rioting as well as the displacement of the rural poor that had depended on the use of these Royal lands as effectively common land, with long-established although informal usage rights. Other local grievances against the Crown included action to suppress profitable tobacco production, which was well established in the Vale of Evesham.

Taxes on imports of goods known as 'tonnage and poundage' were imposed, which reduced the profitability of trade and created opposition in urban centres including Worcester. Similarly, the Ship Money taxation levied in 1636 fell heavily on Worcester, which was the sixteenth highest paying city in England. Puritans including Richard Baxter noted the mounting opposition to Royal policies within the county. The unpopularity of these Royalist policies stemmed from the perception that Charles I was attempting to establish a more authoritarian, non-parliamentary kind of monarchy.

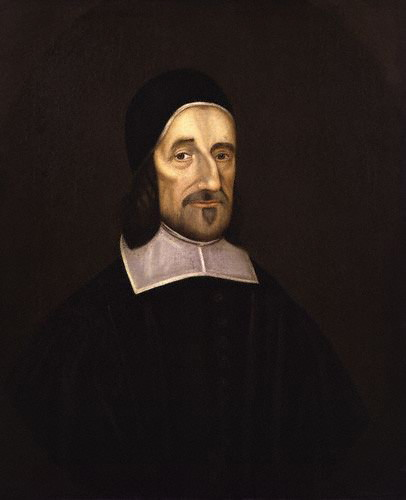
Richard Baxter, the leading Puritan in Kidderminster, noted the rising opposition to King Charles' policies of taxation and rule without Parliament

Charles I's religious policies also provoked suspicion in Worcestershire. Although the county had a Catholic minority among its aristocratic families, the vast majority of the population was firmly Anglican, with a growing group of more radical Protestants in its towns. They had increasing social influence, for instance about public morality and observance of the Sabbath. Increased interest in religious doctrine led to several Worcestershire towns funding lecturers to deliver sermons, including Baxter in Kidderminster. Worcestershire produced some other notable Puritan figures, including Edward Winslow, who migrated to new England with the Pilgrim Fathers. Charles' apparent Catholic sympathies, such as the reforms of William Laud that reintroduced many of the trappings of Catholicism back into the Church of England, would have been viewed with suspicion by many. In Worcester, Roger Mainwaring, as Dean, reintroduced vestments and constructed a marble altar.

In the early 1640s, stories of massacres of Protestants in Ireland helped led to rumours of Catholic plots that spread through the county leading to anti-Catholic riots in Bewdley in late 1641, and instructions to local militias to guard against conspiracies in the following months.

=== Civil War ===
Worcestershire was under Royalist control during most of the First Civil War. Like many parts of England, there was little enthusiasm for either side, and the initial instincts of many was to try to avoid conflict. Different parts of the county had different sympathies, for instance Evesham was notably Parliamentarian, and Kidderminster also had a strong Parliamentarian contingent. The city of Worcester equivocated about whether to support the Parliamentary cause before the outbreak of civil war in 1642, but eventually sided with Parliament. It was however soon under Royalist occupation, as was the rest of the county.

In 1642 the first major skirmish of the Civil War, the Battle of Powick Bridge, on the River Teme close to Worcester, occurred when a cavalry troop of about 1,000 Royalists commanded by Prince Rupert, a German nephew of the King and one of the outstanding cavalry commanders of the war, defeated a Parliamentary cavalry detachment under the command of Colonel John Brown.

The cathedral was used to store arms during the war, possibly as early as September 1642. While Worcester declared itself for Parliament, it was swiftly occupied by the Royalists, who were using the building to store munitions when Essex briefly retook the city after the Powick Bridge skirmish on its outskirts. Parliamentary troops then ransacked the cathedral building. Stained glass was smashed and the organ destroyed, along with library books and monuments. The See was abolished during the Commonwealth and the Protectorate, approximately 1646–60.

Worcester was one of three garrison towns in the county and had to bear the expense of sustaining and billeting a large number of Royalist troops. During the Royalist occupation, the suburbs were destroyed to make defence easier. Responsibility for maintenance of defences was transferred to the military command. High taxation was imposed, and many male residents impressed into the army.

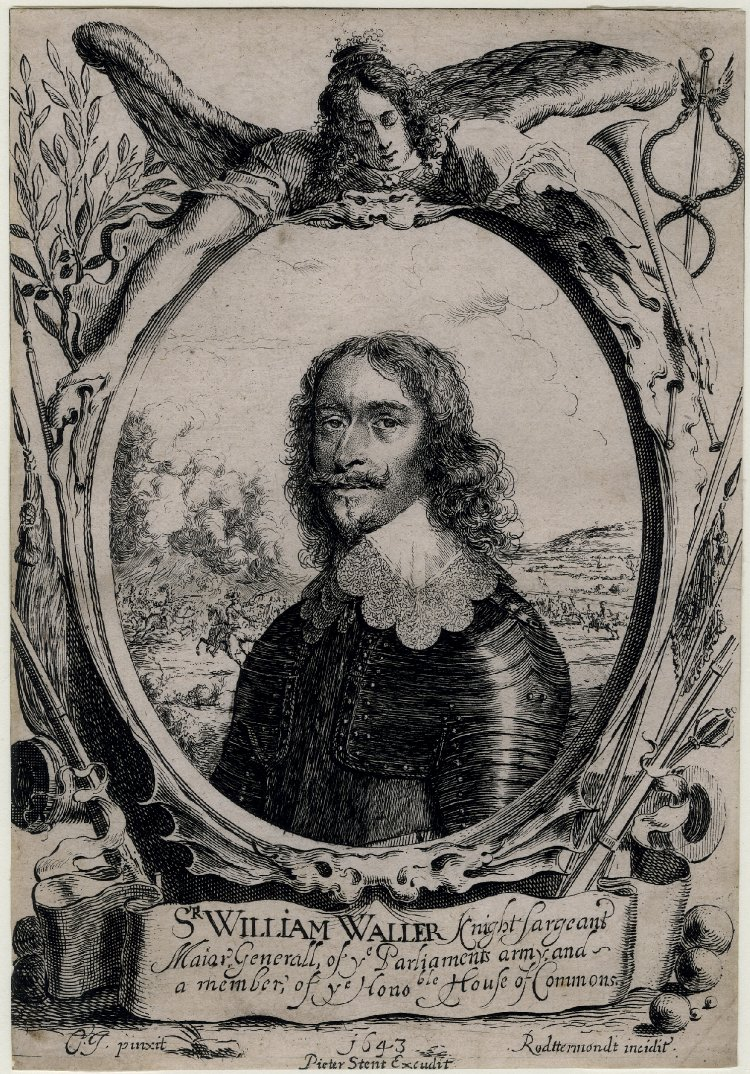
Portrait of Sir William Waller, 1643, whose raids thoroughly depleted the Vale of Evesham

The same pressures created great strain on the county as a whole, as it had to sustain a large, unproductive force drawn out of its productive labour. Taxation, requisitioning by armies and cross-border raids caused great deprivations, made worse by the proximity of Worcestershire to Parliamentary forces to the north around Birmingham, to the east in Warwickshire, and at certain times to the south in Bristol and Gloucestershire. Nevertheless, the county was strategically vital to the Royalists, as a bridge from Wales and Ireland back to their headquarters in Oxford. Worcestershire also provided the Royalists with industrial capacity to produce armaments and munitions.

Bands of Clubmen formed in west Worcestershire in the later part of the first war, with the objective of keeping both armies and their demands away from the rural civilian population, to resist despoliation and requisitioning. There was also a vein of resentment towards the prominent role given many Catholics in the county. The Clubmen's Woodbury Hill proclamation stated that they would not obey any Papist or Papist Recusant, "nor ought [they] … be trusted in any office of state, justice, or judicature".

As Royalist power collapsed in May 1646, Worcester was placed under siege. Worcester had around 5,000 civilians, together with a Royalist garrison of around 1,500 men, facing a 2,500–5,000 strong force of the New Model Army. Worcester finally surrendered on 23 July, bringing the first civil war to a close in Worcestershire.

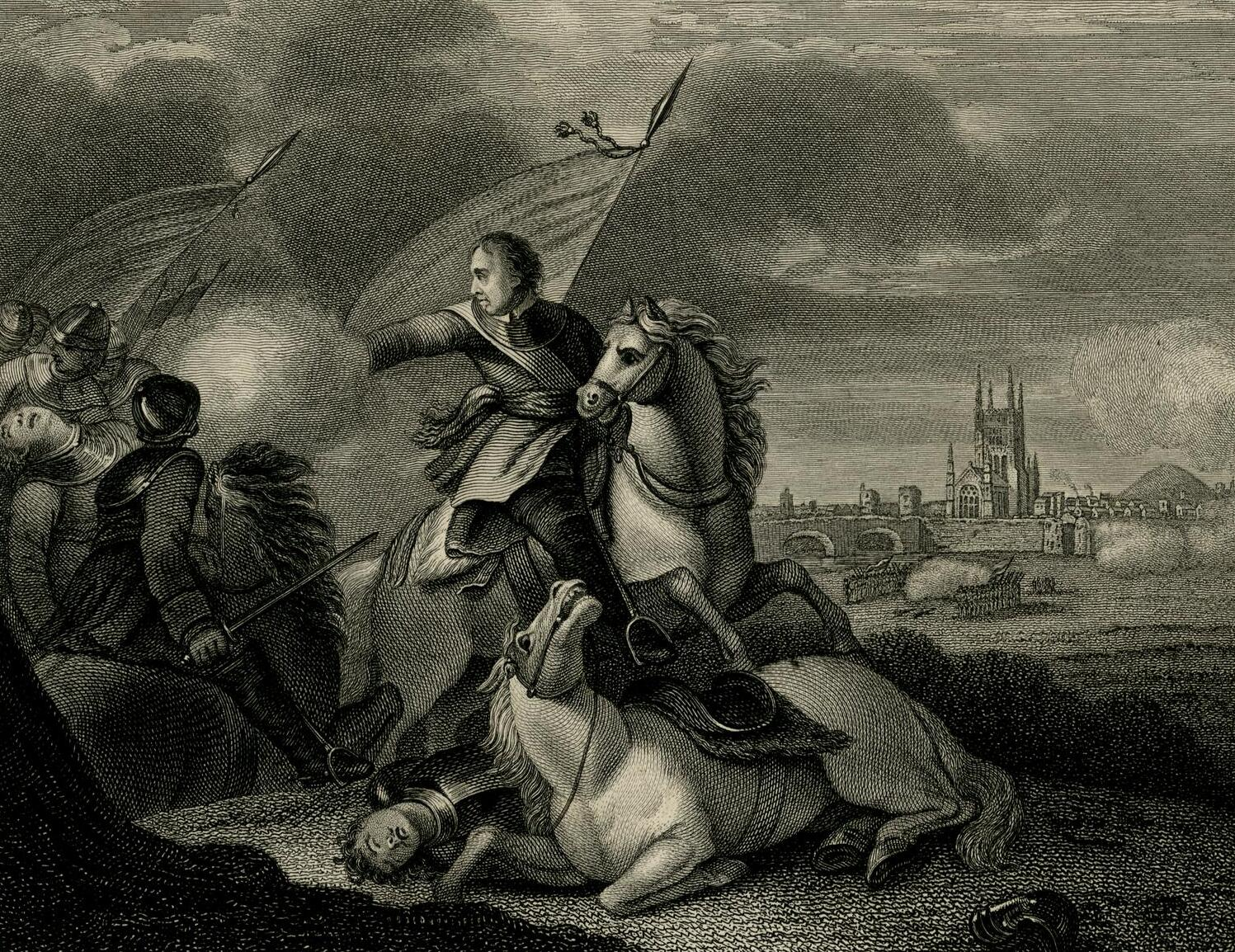
Battle of Worcester

In 1651 a Scottish army marched south along the west coast in support of Charles II's attempt to regain the Crown and entered the county. The 16,000 strong Scottish force caused Worcester's council to vote to surrender as it approached, fearing further violence and destruction. The Parliamentary garrison decided to withdraw to Evesham in the face of the overwhelming numbers against them. The Scots were billeted in and around Worcester, again at great expense and causing new anxiety for the residents. The Scots were joined by very limited local forces, including a company of 60 men under John Talbot.

The Battle of Worcester (3 September 1651), took place in the fields a little to the west and south of the city, near the village of Powick. Charles II was easily defeated by Cromwell's forces of 30,000 men. Charles II returned to his headquarters in what is now known as King Charles House in the Cornmarket, before fleeing in disguise with Talbot's help to Boscobel House in Shropshire, from where he eventually escaped to France. Parliamentary forces ransacked the city, causing over £70,000 of damage according to the city council. Scottish troops fleeing capture were attacked and killed in local skirmishes, while the vast majority were pressed into forced labour in the east of England or new world.

=== The Restoration ===
==== Religion, dissenters and Catholicism ====
At the Restoration of Charles II in 1660, Worcester's cathedral was in considerable disrepair. Only three canons were alive from the period before the Bishopric's abolition in 1649. The new treasurer Barnabas Oley estimated the cost of restoring the damage to the cathedral buildings at over £16,000.

Between 1660 and 1662, Parliament supported a very broad toleration of views in the Church of England, and did not seek to expel ministers except those with most radical religious views. This ended in 1662, when the Act of Uniformity required ministers to accept the Church of England prayer book. Around 2,000 Anglican ministers from the Commonwealth period resigned from the Church of England, including Richard Baxter of Kidderminster, who had also acted as chaplain to Parliamentary troops; he was replaced by his predecessor George Dance. Over 95 of these oustings took place in Worcestershire.

In Bromsgrove, John Spilsbury, previously a fellow of Magdalen College, was removed after the Restoration of the Monarchy in 1660, and left the Church of England by refusing to conform to the Act of Uniformity Thomas Hall, at King's Norton, was also expelled.

Spilsbury was confined to his house, banished from the county and finally imprisoned for his non-conformism. (Note: The toll on his health may have led to ill health and his death.) He did return to Bromsgrove, where he was annually visited by Hall's son, an Anglican bishop.

Changes to the law in 1672 removed the threat of prison and allowed places of worship to be established by licence for some nonconformist groups. Presbyterians were stronger in north Worcestershire, while Congregationalists and Independents could be found more towards the middle and south east.

Religion in Worcestershire 1693
Religious Group	Numbers of worshippers
Nonconformists	1,325
Catholics	727

Splisbury was licensed as a Congregationalist teacher in 1672 in Bromsgrove and died in 1699. Spilsbury's son John led a dissenting congregation in Kidderminster, and in turn, his son Francis Spilsbury became a minister at Salters' Hall in London.

Tolerance for Quakers and Anabaptists was much lower. Quaker leader George Fox was arrested on a visit to Tredington in 1673, however Quakers legally established a meeting house in Worcestershire in Stourbridge in 1688. Anabaptists were strongest in east Worcestershire, where they had strongest support among poorer people, for instance at Kington, where they had congregations in 1669.

At the other end of the religious spectrum, many of the aristocratic families of Worcestershire were Catholics, and were also unable to fully participate in public life. Catholic worship was illegal, however an average of eight priests operated in the county during the seventeenth century. In 1678, during anti-Catholic panic spread after the exposure of an alleged "Popish Plot" against Charles II, Father John Wall who was based at Harvington Hall, was arrested at Rushock Court and imprisoned at Worcester Castle. Although there was little evidence against him, he was hanged, drawn and quartered, the last Catholic to be executed for his faith in the United Kingdom. (Note: John Wall was beatified in 1929. He reportedly prophesied at his execution that he would be the last Catholic martyr. He was made a saint in 1970.)

==== Final years of Charles II ====
Charles II's last years were dominated by his attempts to face down demands from the Whigs to prevent the succession to the throne of a Catholic, Charles' brother James being next in line. To this end, Charles dissolved the 1681 Parliament, which was debating an Exclusion Bill, and then attempted to limit the ability of towns and cities to elect MPs that were unsympathetic to his views. The mechanism for this was the alteration of town charters, to allow the Crown to dismiss key officials, and to limit the parliamentary franchise to the same officials. In 1684, the previous royal charters of Evesham and Worcester were withdrawn, and Evesham given a new restricted franchise along these lines. King James II issued a new charter to Worcester which was less restrictive than Evesham's but allowed him to dismiss council officials.

=== King James II and the Glorious Revolution ===
Catholic worship became more open during James II's rule, and a chapel was established in Worcester near Foregate around 1685. Anti-Catholic riots in the city were narrowly prevented in 1686 outside a private house used for Catholic worship.

In 1688, King James II attempted to remove restrictions on Catholics in public life. These moves were unpopular in Worcestershire as elsewhere. As James II canvassed his support with local officials, those in Worcester were evasive in the responses. By October, the King was forced to placate public disquiet, and restored the rights of cities like Worcester, with the result that the local council dismissed the Mayor and reinstated the previous one. The same council recorded its support for the Prince of Orange in December. In 1689, James visited Worcester as guest of Bishop Thomas as he toured the country. The town council accompanied him on his request to visit the new Catholic chapel, but reportedly refused to enter it.

Bishop Thomas was not among the seven bishops that objected to King James' Declaration of Indulgence, which aimed at rehabilitating Catholics into public life, along with Protestants outside of the Church of England, but supported their stance. The trial of the bishops led to James being deposed and replaced by William of Orange. Bishop Thomas was among those who refused to give an oath of allegiance to the new jing, on the principle that a regency should govern rather than a new king, while James was alive. A number of other Worcester clergy took the same stance of loyalty to the Stuarts and were removed from the Church as Non-Jurors. (Note: Among those who are still remembered was the young Thomas Morris, vicar of Claines, whose gravestone states Miserrimus, or 'most poor'.) John Somers, the lawyer who represented the seven bishops, represented Worcester in the Convention Parliament that confirmed William as king.

During Charles II and James II's reigns, strict controls on the press had been maintained. These broke down during the 1689 revolution and were removed in 1695. Around 1690 the Worcester Post-Man appears to have been established, from which the Berrow's Journal claims descent.

== Georgian Worcestershire 1690-1830 ==
=== Georgian society, politics and religion ===
The larger and more industrial towns in Worcestershire began to grow and suffer from overcrowding and disease. Infilling of towns within their traditional confines was common, Worcester was particularly densely infilled. Kidderminster extended to accommodate workers in the growing carpet industry. However, the upper and middle classes began to fuel a market in larger brick town houses, often in terraces on new land on the outskirts of towns. These often also included improvements to services such as paving and lighting.

Stourport grew rapidly from a hamlet to a fashionable town after it became the point that the canal network met the River Severn in 1770, and included many town house developments.

Great Malvern's growth as a spa town dates to this period, offering water cures, particularly after Dr Wall publicised their efficacy in 1757. Hotels began to accommodate visitors seeking treatments, and a pump room and baths were built in 1823.

==== Georgian politics ====
While Worcestershire might have been expected to have significant Jacobite sympathies, from its Catholic families and connections with the Stuarts, these do not have appeared to have resulted in much political or religious expression other than the refusal of a significant minority of Church of England clergy to swear allegiance to William of Orange. However, some sign of such views can perhaps be detected in the formation of a Whig Constitution Club in Worcester.

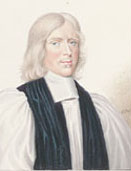
William Lloyd

Worcester's Bishop William Lloyd was a prominent Whig. In 1710, Henry Sacheverell, a Tory with conservative religious views, who had been imprisoned for preaching against the tolerance of dissenters, travelled through Worcester on his way to Shropshire. Bishop Lloyd attempted to prevent the ringing of church bells in his honour by Worcester's residents. When a group of supporters broke into St Nicholas' Church, they found the bells without clappers and resorted to bashing them with anything iron. This produced a discordant noise, and turned the attempt to greet Sacheverell with honour into something of a farce.

Pressure for political reform built as towns increased in size. Parliamentary representation was increasingly unfair where towns had grown. At the end of the period, Droitwich and Worcester, for instance, had two MPs each, though Worcester was nearly ten times as large. Dudley, which was a similar size to Worcester, had no representation at all. The voting system was also extremely limited and open to corruption. Droitwich had 38 votes cast in 1747, while Bewdley had just 30 or 40 burgesses to elect their MP. Evesham had 555 votes cast in 1818. The low numbers of voters encouraged corruption and electoral challenges. Discontent led to the Priestley Riots in Birmingham in 1791, which included buildings being burnt down in King's Norton. The Napoleonic Wars reduced pressures for change, but they re-emerged after their conclusion. Local government suffered similar problems.

The 1815 Corn Law attracted widespread opposition, as it was designed to force the price of bread upwards. In May 1814, a public meeting in Worcester led to a petition being signed by 6,000 people in just two days. Petitions were also raised in Dudley and Droitwich. The following year, 8,000 people signed a second petition in Worcester, this time over an afternoon.

==== The landed classes ====
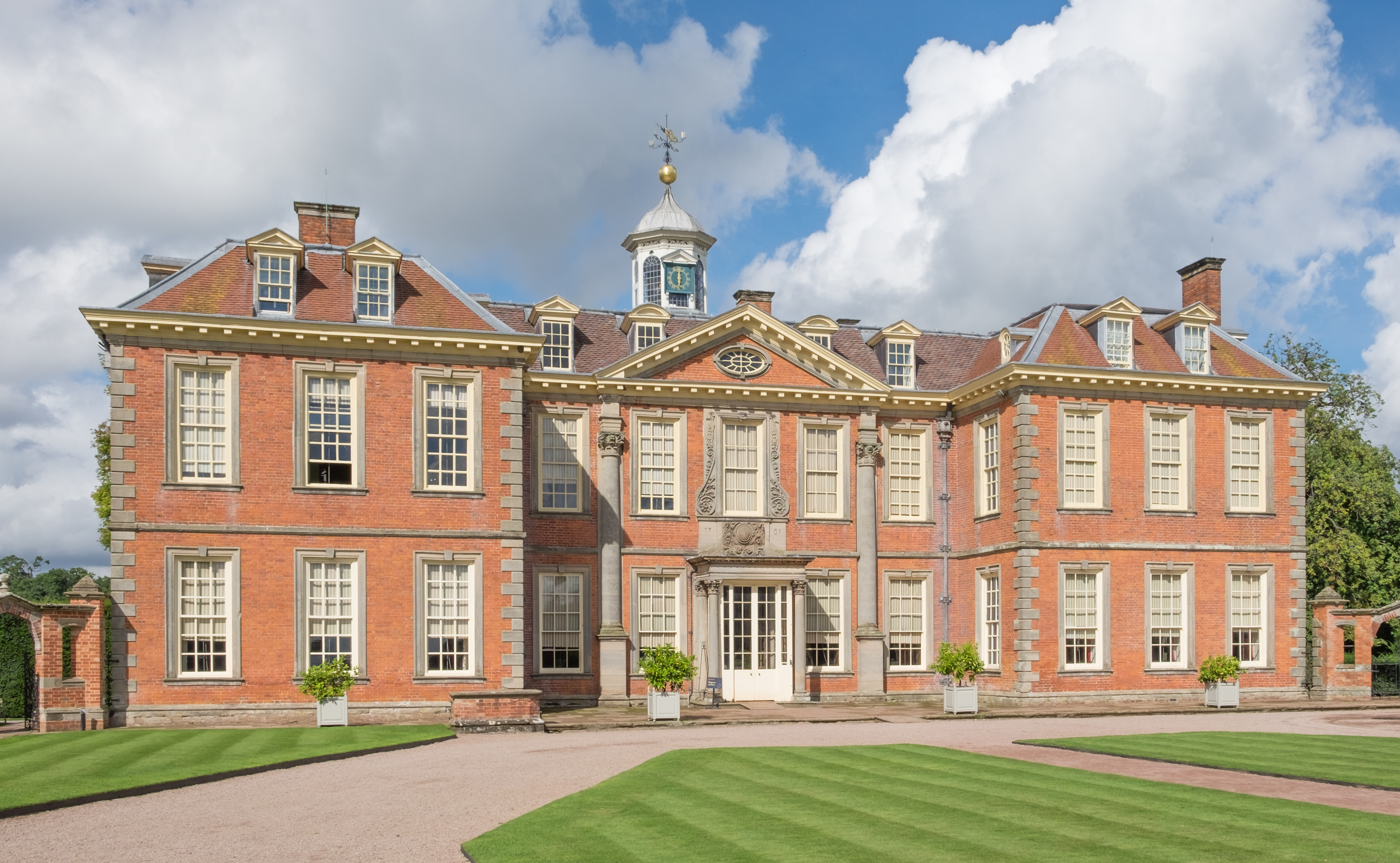
Hanbury Hall, completed around 1706

The prosperity of Worcestershire's landed classes is attested to by the construction of great houses in this period, which stands in contrast to the decades immediately after the Civil War. Examples include Croome Court, whose gardens were designed by Capability Brown; Hagley Hall; and Hanbury Hall. Around 40 such properties were built or rebuilt in the between 1660 and 1832. Church building also reflected increased wealth, such as the Baroque chapel at Great Witley. They were sustained by rents from tenant farmers, and other incomes. The Foleys at Great Whitley, for instance, had income from their ironworks. Many of these landowners were also politically prominent, such as Thomas Winnington of Stanford-on-Teme.

==== Religion ====
The Church of England underwent a period of quiet, but this included some church rebuilding and expansion as the population and wealth of the area grew. Churches in Stourbridge, Smethwick, Bewdley and Upton on Severn were rebuilt in 1728 and 1757. At Great Witley, a Baroque Italianate church was built by Thomas Foley in 1735, from iron-making profits.

John Wesley generated new vigour to the Church of England from 1739 onwards, visiting Worcestershire only in 1761 however, preaching to a group in Evesham. Methodist Chapels were established in the 1770s and 1780s, for instance in Worcester and Stourport.

Another group, the Evangelicals, broke away from the established church, building chapels in Cradley, Evesham in 1789 and Birdport in Worcester in 1804–5.

The first Catholic chapel in Worcester since James II's reign was opened in 1829, shortly after the Sacramental Test Act 1828 and other legislation removed most of the legal discrimination against Catholics.

==== Regulation of poverty ====
Bequests to the poor were common in wills. These could be small, for direct distribution, or larger, for the purpose of maintaining almshouses or providing a small income to impoverished individuals over time, for instance through property rents or land.

Poor Relief was levied on people who had sufficient income. It was used to help the poor in their homes ('out relief'), on a weekly or occasional basis, to grant clothing or other essentials, or even building repairs. In Belbroughton in 1831, with a population of 1,476, 68 weekly payments were made. Poor relief however was only due to residents of a parish, provable through a certificate of residence. Others could be removed; for instance at Hanley Castle over 110 individuals were removed between 1717 and 1835, and a similar number returned. This often involved the return of pregnant women. In 1830, for example, a woman was returned to Hanley Castle from Bristol after falling pregnant by a shoemaker who was married.

Worcester gained a workhouse in 1703, to deal with a rise in poverty and prevent itinerant beggars. Children found begging would be committed to the workhouse until they could be apprenticed for seven years at age 15.

=== Rural Worcestershire ===
While agriculture grew, intensified and diversified, bad harvests in this period led to deaths for instance in 1708-12 or high prices in 1800 which led to bread riots in Worcester. Gentry tended to lead the improvements, having the capital to invest. In the 1690s, Thomas Foley introduced water irrigation in Chaddesley Corbett at a cost of £500, quadrupling the value of the meadows.

Worcestershire's rural communities changed as manufacturing narrowed craft and small-scale production outside of factories. Additionally, the enclosure movement changed the rights to land and grazing, removing traditional rights, but allowing more commercial exploitation of land. Enclosure began with Royal Forests, including Malvern Chase and Feckenham Forest in the seventeenth century, and continued slowly in the early to mid eighteenth century.

Early enclosures in Worcestershire
Area	Reign	Year
Feckenham Forest	Charles I	1629
Malvern Chase	Charles I	1632
Aston Magna, Blockley		1733
Alderminster		1736
Besford Common		1751

Enclosure sped up greatly in the reign of George III, in the period 1760–1820. By the end of this process, nearly all common land in the county was enclosed, representing around a fifth of the land in county. As elsewhere, this tended to cause a shift away from arable production to more lucrative grazing. While the commercial benefits may have been clear for landowners, the effect on independent small farmers was not fully compensated for. The result was that many enclosures caused riots, such as the disturbances at Leigh in 1778, where anti-enclosure rioters attacked the physical enclosure:

with their faces blackened and being otherwise disguised, and armed with guns and other offensive weapons; … in the most daring manner did cut down, burn, and entirely destroy all the posts, gates and rails.

Arable, mostly wheat, farming was found throughout Worcestershire but was dominant in the south. Fodder for animals increased, such as hay, clover and peas. The Vale of Evesham produced vegetables, corn, cheese and butter, and increased horticulture. Hops were grown in the Teme valley particularly, and accounted for nearly 6,000 acres of production in 1794. Hop markets were held in several towns, most importantly at Worcester. Perry was produced for instance at Newland.

Grain production increased in north east Worcestershire, due to new production techniques.

=== Manufacturing industries ===
As noted above, metal and other manufacturing industries gradually built up in Worcestershire through the seventeenth century, especially in the north of the county. Glass manufacturing, iron smelting and coal mining were all well established before 1700.

Iron production with coal from the South Staffordshire coalfield, which extends into Worcestershire, took off in 1772, with the construction of an ironworks by John Wilkinson near Dudley. There were 14 on the coalfield by 1794 producing 13,000 tons of cast iron a year. The increased production of iron in turn caused the growth of the nailmaking and needle industries in the north of county.

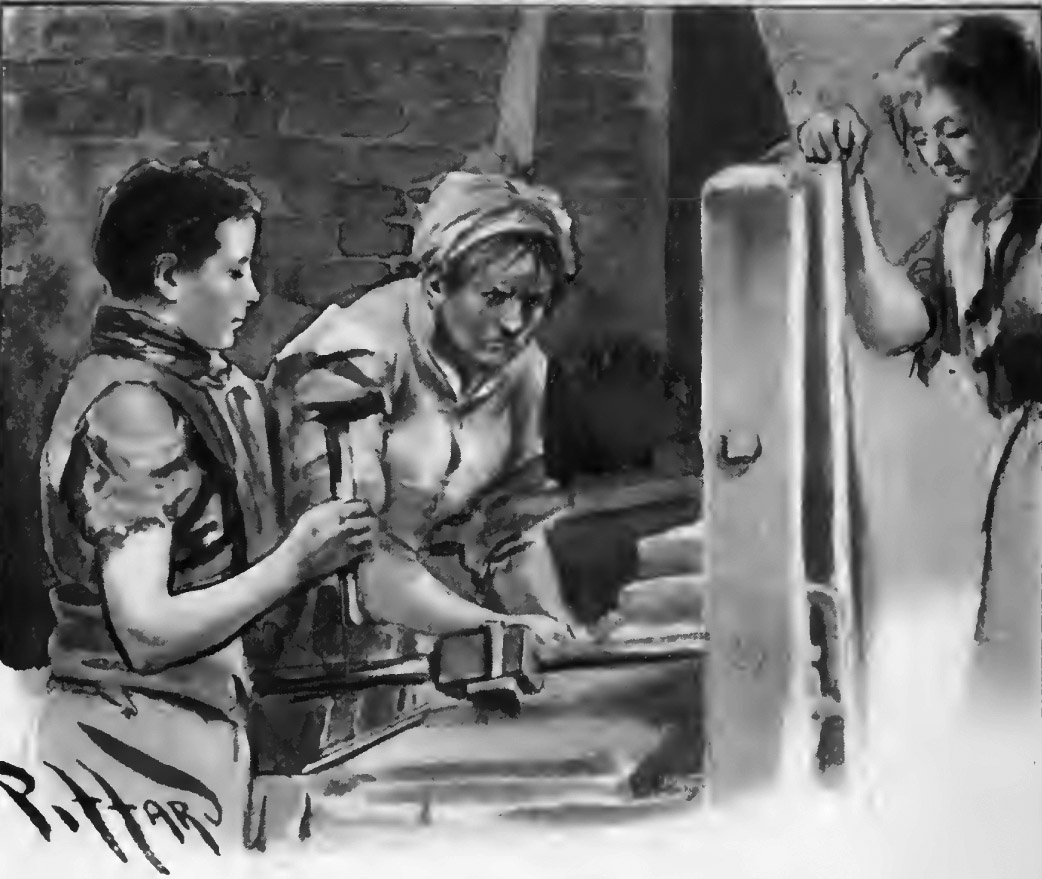
Nailmakers in Bromsgrove c.1896

By the 1831 census, 2,751 people were engaged in nailmaking in Worcestershire, primarily in Bromsgrove, Dudley and Northfield. The industry was prone to low wages. Nailmakers, who supplied iron rods for manufacture and bought nails back, were able to exploit their labourers greatly through control of rents, along with middle men making loans through 'truck' systems. This led to hardship and strikes.

Needle-makers concentrated along the River Arrow, particularly Redditch, which also specialised in springs and hooks. The process of scouring and sharpening needles caused metal dust to enter the lungs, at great cost to the health of workers.

Many traditional industries such as tanning, milling and brewing continued through the county, but the cloth trade went into decine, out competed by industries in Gloucestershire and Yorkshire among others. Cap-making survived in Bewdley, however, and weavers in Kidderminster found new employment in carpet manufacturing. The first carpet factory opened there in 1735. Skills and techniques were brought in from Brussels, to compete with high quality manufacturers from elsewhere in the United Kingdom such as Axminster and Wilton. By 1807, there were 1,000 looms in Kidderminster. Poor trade conditions in the late 1820s however, when 2,000 looms were not working for an 18-week period, in 1828, led to riots where £3,000 of damage was done during one night.

Glass-making in Stourbridge grew in the 1700s, at first being known for coloured window glass. In 1780, techniques allegedly stolen from German manufacturers meant that the trade in cut and crystal glass developed. (Note: George Ensall claimed to have observed their techniques while disguised as a minstrel.)

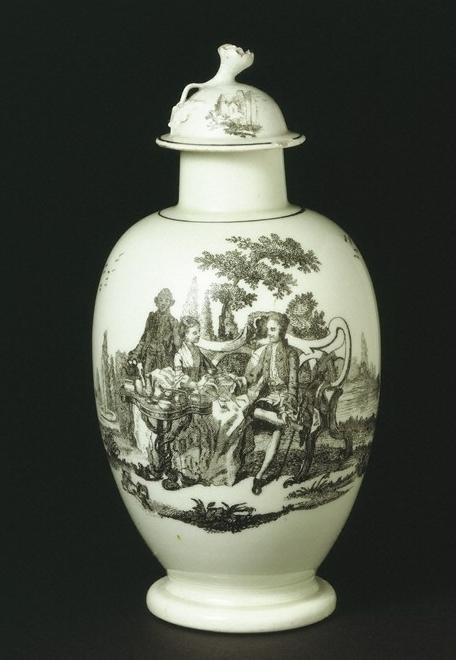
Tea canister, about 1768, Worcester porcelain factory V&A Museum no. 1448&A-1853.

Bone china and porcelain production started in Worcester in 1751, using clay imported from Cornwall. It specialised in the use of transfer printing, which was cheaper and easier than hand painting. The Worcester Royal Porcelain Company gained its name and extended its sales by persuading George III to visit in 1788, and then opened a sales outlet in London, aimed at the luxury market.

Workers in Worcester who suffered from the decline of the cloth trade shifted production to leather gloves. The Napoleonic Wars allowed the industry to thrive, as French imports were halted. Leather was cut in factories, and then finished in homes by women and children. Factories were established in Sidbury including those of John Dent and George Allen. The industry suffered once trade with France was reestablished however, particularly in exports to the USA.

=== Transportation ===
Equally as important were improvements to roads and navigation, so that goods could be transported and sold. The River Severn was navigable up to Bewdley, toll-free as Government prevented local government from imposing charges. In the seventeenth century, the Avon and Stour were made navigable. However, it was in the later eighteenth century that great improvements were made, as canals opened trade across Worcestershire and the Midlands.

In 1771, the Staffordshire and Worcestershire Canal opened, aiming to join the Severn and Trent rivers. It was originally intended to link with the Severn at Bewdley, but opted for Stourport because of opposition, causing Stourport to rapidly expand from less than a village to a major and fashionable town. The Droitwich Canal opened at a similar time, and work began to set up the Worcester and Birmingham Canal. Opposition from landowners to this was fierce, but Parliament's permission in 1791 was greeted with celebrations in Worcester. Nevertheless, it was not particularly profitable.

== Victorian and Edwardian Worcestershire: 1830–1914 ==
The population of the county rose rapidly, from 220,000 in the 1831 census to 488,355 in 1901. Infant mortality was high during most of the century, and outbreaks of epidemics remained common. Housing was particularly bad in the industrial areas, especially Dudley. Health Inspector William Lee reported in 1851 that "In no other part of England and Wales is the work of human extermination effected in so short a time as … in Dudley".

Population growth in Worcestershire
Settlement	1831	1901
Broadway	1,517	1,414
Pershore	5,275	4,825
Bromsgrove	8,612	14,096
Worcester	27,641	49,790
Great Malvern	4,150	19,131
Halesowen	9,765	38,868
Yardley	2,488	33,946

Small towns in the county tended to stagnate or shrink slightly in size, such as Alvechurch, Bewdley, Broadway, Pershore, Tenbury and Upton on Severn. The larger towns including Bromsgrove, Droitwich, Evesham and Worcester roughly doubled in size. In the north of the county, however, the industrial towns grew vastly in places such as Halesowen, Dudley and Yardley.

Spa towns were formed. Great Malvern quadrupled due its promotion as a spa town. Tenbury Wells, however, failed to capture similar success after a pump room was built in 1840. In the 1880s, John Corbett invested salt profits from Stoke Works into spa facilities and hotels in Droitwich, opening St Andrew's Brine baths in 1887. However, Droitwch did not capture the same growth as Malvern, perhaps because it did not have the same appeal from the hills and walks at Malvern.

=== Politics ===
Rejection of the Reform Bill in 1831 led to a riot in Worcester. The mayor was hit by a stone thrown by the rioters, and called in the Hussars to suppress the disturbance. The disturbances were directed however not just at the lack of parliamentary reform, but also at the dissatisfaction with local government, which was still operating as a system of self-appointed town burgesses electing councils in Bewdley, Droitwich, Evesham, Kidderminster and Worcester.

Protests against the high bread prices caused by the Corn Laws and political reform could combine. In 1842, a meeting in Worcester passed a resolution making the point that a representative Parliament would never have backed the Corn Laws. The Worcester Mayor prevented the full meeting from backing a motion in support of the 1838 People's Charter which called for universal male suffrage.

Reaction to the political defeat of Chartism in the early 1840s led to a movement to liberate the working people through ownership of land holdings. Subscriptions were set up to fund small villages of Chartists with land holdings; two of these were in Worcestershire, in Dodford and at Lowbands, Redmarley d'Abitot. The scheme however was not sustainable and was wound up as a Ponzi scheme by Parliament.

The Municipal Reform Act 1835 created a system of elected mayors, aldermen and councillors. The franchise was restricted by a property qualification and to men. In Droitwich, the town clerk resisted the changes by refusing to hand over documents to the new authority. Other towns were granted new borough administrations, although this was a slow process; being granted many decades later in Dudley (1865) and Stourbridge (1914). Bromsgrove's town was made an urban district in 1858.

Nevertheless, political corruption persisted in Worcester throughout the century. Votes were bought through simple bribes, for instance of money or beer, which were seen by some poorer people as an important supplement to their meagre incomes. Extension of voting rights made such bribery very expensive. Despite the Corrupt and Illegal Practices Prevention Act 1883 that made these activities clearly illegal, the practices continued and were investigated by a royal commission in 1906, which found that around 500 people in Worcester continued to sell their votes, at this stage to the Conservative Party. The investigation, which was prompted by the Liberal Party, dented the liberal vote for many years after as a result.

Town and municipal facilities improved in the period. New town halls were built and gas street lighting installed. Libraries and institutes were built especially in the later 1800s and public parks created.

=== Education ===
Efforts to provide education were driven by national legislation. Localities had often supplied free education to the poor through endowments, but this was fractured and far from universal. The Church of England National Society began to provide voluntary educational facilities, and after the Elementary Education Act 1870, the gaps began to be plugged through local school boards. Schooling became compulsory in 1880. Some of the older grammar schools reformed their management. After the Education Act 1902 local authorities began to open secondary schools.

Independent schools were also established, such as Malvern College in 1865 and St Michael's College in Tenbury in 1856.

Technical education developed through Mechanics Institutes, for instance leading to Worcester's School of Art and Science being opened in the 1890s.

=== The Poor laws ===
The Poor Law Amendment Act 1834 required that parishes pool their resources to support the poor in unions under the supervision of boards of guardians. This established new workhouses across Worcestershire. For instance, 34 parishes around Pershore built a workhouse for 200 paupers, initially providing work breaking stones. By 1894, 11 unions across Worcestershire provided for 7,228 people in workhouses, such as the Martley Poor Law Union. Punishments for infractions could be harsh.

=== Religion and church building ===
Victorian church building and restoration in Worcestershire
Church	Architect	Year
St James the Great's Church, Blakedown	G. E. Street	1866
St Peter's Church, Cowleigh	G. E. Street	1865
St John the Evangelist's Church, Stourbridge	G. E. Street	1860–61
St James' Church, West Malvern	G. E. Street	1871
St Laurence, Alvechurch	William Butterfield	1859-61
St Mary, Sedgeberrow	William Butterfield	1867-68
St Peter and St Paul at Upton on Severn	Arthur Blomfield	1878-79
St Michael, Smethwick	A.E. Street	1892
Worcester (restoration)	A.E. Perkins, Sir Giles Gilbert Scott	

With the rising population and wealth of the county, many Anglican churches were built, rebuilt or restored, driven on the Oxford High Church movement of the 1840s and the evangelical movement. Particular effort was made to deepen the work of the church in the industrial and now heavily populated north of Worcestershire. Worcester Cathedral's exterior and windows were also restored. New churches were built, often in the Gothic style, including the work of several nationally known architects.

Nonconformists also grew their chapels, which began to look more like churches than meeting halls. Catholic churches began to be built, as the result of the repeal of restrictions in 1829. At Hanley Swan, the Church of Our Lady and St Alphonsus was built by descendants of Thomas Hornyold who had aided Charles II's escape. In general, the continuing Catholic connections of the county meant that new churches were established with greater funding than in many other parts of the country.

=== Industry ===
Industry dominated the northern parts of the county, in what was by then known as the Black Country. Coal mining took place on the edge of the Staffordshire coalfield around Dudley, Stourbridge and Netherton; most were shallow mines at under 60 feet deep. The coal was soft and unsuitable for most industrial uses. Nevertheless, in the Dudley area, annual production was around 700,000 tons, employing 2,500 people. Another area around the Wyre Forest also produced coal, but at a lower quality from thin seams. Ironstone was also mined extensively but was of low iron content. Ore was brought in from other areas.

The iron industries in the northern area produced chains, anvils and many kinds of tools. Nail making predominated in some areas including Bromsgrove. Scythe-making in Belbroughton continued but declined.

In Kidderminister in 1838, 24 carpet manufacturers controlled around 2,000 looms. These were lent to workers who worked them in their own homes. Over the course of the century, the practice changed so that they were worked in factories. in 1841, 138 needle and fish hook makers could be found in Worcestershire, the vast majority in the Redditch area.

Droitwich continued to produce salt, and workings were extended to Stoke Prior, extracting salt through copper rods at a depth of 200 feet.

In Worcester, the Royal Porcelain Company faced competition and tried to counter it by moving to more specialist production such as biscuit ware. A similar pattern could be seen in the glove industry, which by 1851 employed around 2,500 glovemakers, much less than in its heyday. These were mostly working at home; these jobs moved to factories over the century with the introduction of new sewing machinery.

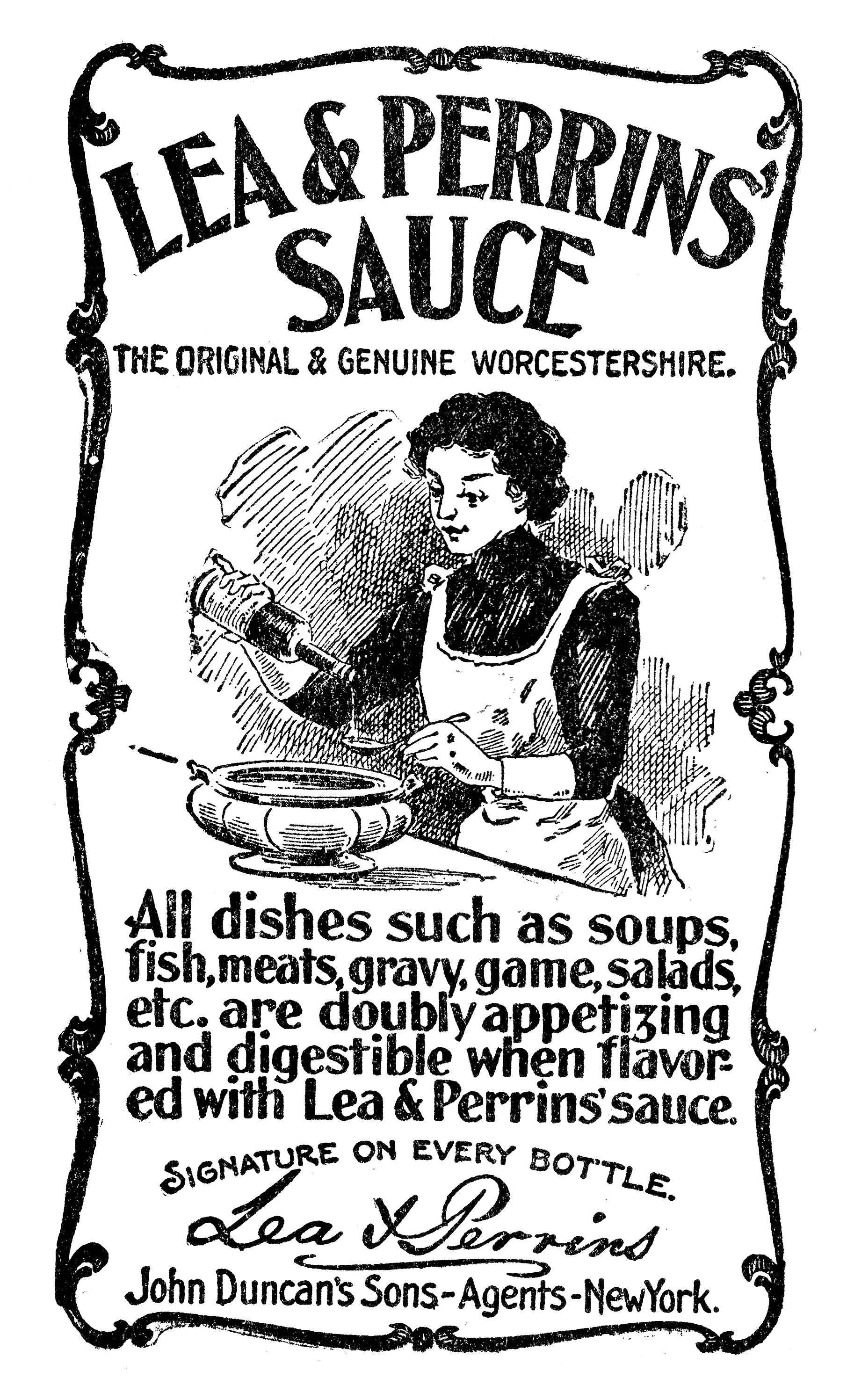
Lea & Perrins advertisement (1900)

Lea & Perrins Worcestershire sauce began to be made and bottled in Worcester around 1837, first produced by two chemists, it is claimed according to a recipe supplied by an unnamed "Nobleman of the County". Production expanded, and a new factory was opened at the Midland Road on 16 October 1897, which accommodated exports to the USA.

==== Transportation ====
The navigability of the River Severn was improved by new locks after an act of Parliament of 1842. Roads also improved through investment from the turnpike trust system, which also enabled the stage coach network, for instance connecting Worcester with Liverpool in eleven hours from 1832.

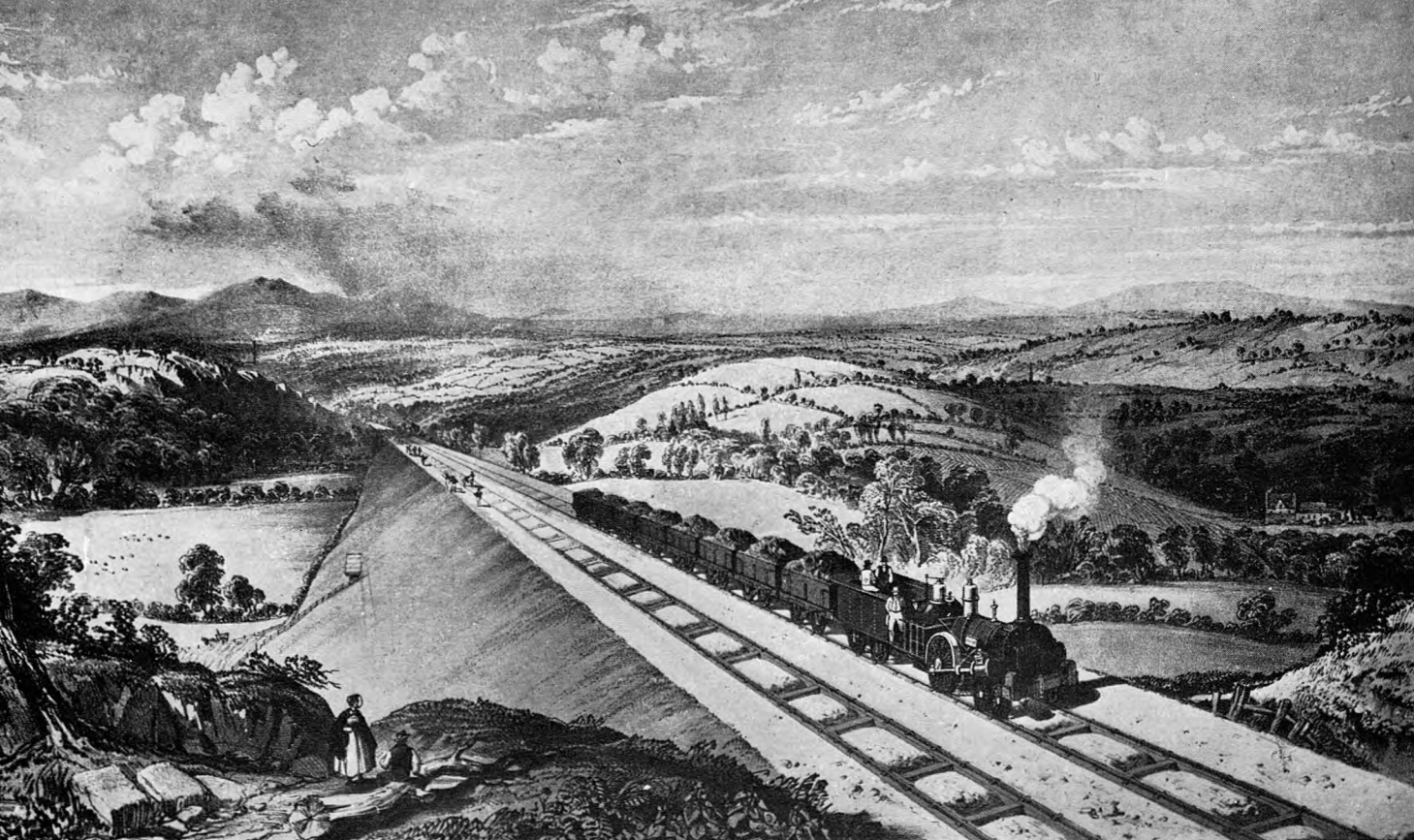
The Lickey Incline about 1845

With the advent of steam power, mass transportation of goods moved from canals to rail. Railways progressed more slowly in Worcestershire than in other parts of the country. The Birmingham and Gloucester Railway was opened in 1840, but did not pass through Worcester due to the opposition of landlords. The route was controversial due to its route through the Lickey Hills, involving the very steep and long Lickey Incline.

Worcester was connected to the rail network ten years later, and gained a route to London in 1852. The north of Worcestershire was the mostly closely connected by the rail network, due to the predominance of iron, steel, coal and other industries.

The arrival of the railways was often a cause of great celebrations; a breakfast, carnival and ball was organised in Tenbury Wells in 1864 when it was connected to the Kidderminster line. The benefits could be enormous: at Great Malvern in 1861, the line from Worcester brought 3,000 visitors in the first twelve months of its operation.

=== Agriculture ===
The 1830s and 40s were particularly difficult for rural Worcestershire, due to high prices imposed by the Corn Laws. The 1850s and 60s were much more prosperous, due to demand from the towns. Bad harvests in the 1870s were followed by cheap food imports from the USA.

Wheat was the main crop in Worcestershire, but declined after the 1870s. Beans and potatoes were more important than in previous periods, and dairy products increased production, leading to a 40% growth in pasture lands. The Vale of Evesham, supplying fresh vegetables to Birmingham by rail, grew in prosperity and population, in marked contrast to the static or declining rural population elsewhere. Strawberries were grown from the 1870s. Asparagus, rhubarb and salads were other common crops.

Hop production also expanded by around 50% in 1874–1901, especially in the Teme valley. Wire frames replaced poles, and the use of insecticide and pesticide sprays enabled this growth in supply. However, foreign supplies caused protests against dumping in 1908.

Sales of produce and livestock through regular markets or 'fairs' was especially significant. Worcester and Bromsgrove had a monthly fair. Evesham held a wool fair on 14 August, and Stourbridge had a five-day horse fair in late March. Livestock markets were gradually moved onto specific sites because of the disturbance they caused. Many towns also built dedicated corn exchanges, such as that in Angel Street in Worcester.

=== Rural society ===
Villages in this period sustained their own shops and crafts, for instance a blacksmith, who would make repairs and shoe horses, joiners and carpenters. Day labourers would supply horses and carts. Corn mills were also extremely important for local production of flour. Local traditions such as Maypole dressing, the Hartlebury Wake of St James, 'Thomasing' (where old women would beg for alms on St Thomas's day) were common.

Pubs were a focal point for communities. Beer production was a big part of the local economy. One result was that alcoholism was also a problem. Over time, local authorities began to restrict the numbers of pubs. Village sports grew in the period, particularly through formation of local football and cricket clubs in the 1880s and 90s.

Large estate houses dominated rural parishes, as centres of authority and employment. Hagley Hall, for instance, employed 21 resident servants and a governess, for the Lyttleton's family of ten and their guests. Their owners increasingly included families that had made their fortunes in industry; often they sought out country residences as a way to signal their status and achievement. Witley Court was bought by the heir to the Dudley's, William Ward, who let the house to rich tenants, including Queen Adelaide in 1844–46.

Houses were built and extended, many in the Gothic style, such as Madresfield Court near Great Malvern, which includes an Arts and Crafts chapel interior. Astley Hall was built in a Jacobean style in the 1830s and Bricklehampton Hall in an Italiante style in 1848. Chateau Impney near Droitwich was built by salt magnate John Corbett for his French wife.

== Worcestershire since 1914 ==
The twentieth century saw further rises of population, but also a slowing of the pace of growth. Rural population density was higher in the north than the south and west. Industries shifted away from manufacturing, declining from 40% of jobs in Worcestershire 1931 to 25% across Hereford and Worcester by 1980. Services were the dominant employers even at the start of period, with 45% of full time jobs in 1931, to 60% in 1980. Only 5% of the population were in agricultural work, although it remained dominant in land use. Female employment increased, but two thirds of full time jobs were held by men in 1980.

Heavy industries were dominant in the early part of the century. Metals and engineering dominated the north of county, in Dudley, Halesown, Oldbury and Stourbridge. Carpet manufacturing dominated Kidderminister. The glove industry in Worcester was already in decline, but still contributed to employment at the start of the period. Dents, the main employer, left Worcester in the 1930s.

Worcester continued to develop metal industries in the period. Bromsgrove gained a major drop forge plant, Garringtons, after the Second World War.

Commuting became a regular feature of work in the county. By 1961, for instance, in Halesown, half of the employees travelled outside of the borough for work, and nearly a quarter to Birmingham.

Mixed farming continued to be important across the county, and fruit and market vegetables dominated in the Vale of Evesham. Hop production in the Teme Valley declined as beer production patterns centralised, and moved towards lager.

=== Great War ===
Worcester was a centre for recruitment of soldiers to fight in the First World War, into the Worcestershire Regiment, which was based at Norton Barracks. The regiment took part in early battles in the war, most notably at the Battle of Gheluvelt in October 1914, which prevented the German army from reaching Belgian ports. (Note: Worcester's Gheluvelt Park was opened in 1922 to commemorate the battle and war dead.)

The newly appointed Vicar of St Paul's in Worcester, Geoffrey Studdert Kennedy, was among those urging men to enlist. He became an army chaplain, later known as 'Woodbine Willy', as he brought cigarettes to soldiers during fighting and exposed himself to physical danger, earning him a Military Cross. Shops in Worcester organised collections to supply him with cigarettes. His experience of war ushed him towards pacifism and Christian Socialism. After the war, he left his Worcester parish, but kept a house in the city for the rest of his life.

In 1966, parts of Birmingham were brought together with Worcestershire into Warley. This area stayed within the county until 1974.

=== Hereford and Worcester ===
In 1974 the county was merged with Herefordshire to form a large single administrative county of Hereford and Worcester which in 1998 was reverted to the original historical counties. Some changes in borders occurred with some areas such as Halesowen, Stourbridge, and the exclave of Dudley, which used to be part of northern Worcestershire becoming part of West Midlands metropolitan county. Yardley had already been made part of Birmingham in the county of Warwickshire.

=== Current administrative arrangements ===
Worcestershire County Council was re-established in 1998. However, the post-1998 county does not correspond exactly to the pre-1974 boundaries. (Note: See Evolution of Worcestershire county boundaries (Hereford and Worcester (1974–1998)) for full detail of transfers to the West Midlands in this period.) The County Council and the county's six district, borough and city councils were invited to submit proposals for a new structure of local government during 2025.

== See also ==
- Evolution of Worcestershire county boundaries
