= Maurice MacBrien =

The Most Reverend Maurice MacBrien
- Bishop of Emly
- Church: Catholic Church
- In office: 1567–1586
- Predecessor: Raymund Burke
- Successor: Maurice Hurley (bishop)

Orders
- Consecration: 7 October 1571 by Scipione Rebiba

Personal details
- Died: 1586 Emly, Ireland

Maurice MacBrien (died 1586) was a Roman Catholic prelate who served as Bishop of Emly (1567–1586).

== Biography ==
On 24 January 1567, he was appointed during the papacy of Pope Pius V as Bishop of Emly. On 7 October 1571, he was consecrated bishop by Scipione Rebiba, Cardinal-Priest of Santa Maria in Trastevere. with Umberto Locati, Bishop of Bagnoregio, and Eustachio Locatelli, Bishop of Reggio Emilia, serving as co-consecrators. He served as Bishop of Emly until his death in 1586.

Catholic Church titles
Preceded by Raymund Burke	Bishop of Emly; 1567–1586	Succeeded by Maurice Hurley
