= Ragnall Ua Flainn Chua =

Ragnall Ua Flainn Chua (anglicised Reginald O'Flanua) was Bishop of Emly from when Emly Cathedral was burnt down in 1192 until his death in 1197.
