= Archbishopric of Cashel =

Archbishopric of Cashel may refer to:

Catholic

- the present Roman Catholic Archdiocese of Cashel and Emly, with see in Thurles
- the former Catholic (pre-reformation) Archdiocese of Cashel, with pre-Reformation see in Thurles, which merged with the Roman Catholic Diocese of Emly into the above

Anglican

- the former archdiocese of the Church of Ireland which was demoted to Diocese of Cashel and Ossory

== See also ==
- Archbishop of Cashel, list of archiepiscopal incumbents by succession line
