= Arthur Ware (priest) =

Anglican priest in Ireland

Arthur Ware (d 1671) was an Anglican priest in Ireland during the 17th century.

The son of Sir James Ware, Auditor General of Ireland, he was educated at Trinity College, Dublin. Ware was appointed a prebendary of Emly Cathedral in 1640, and Archdeacon of Meath in 1643, holding both posts until 1660.

His brother was an eminent historian.
