= Raymond Burke =

Raymond or Ray Burke may refer to:

- Raymond Burke (clarinetist) (1904–1986), New Orleans jazz clarinetist
- Raymond H. Burke (1881–1954), American politician from Ohio
- Raymond Leo Burke (born 1948), American Catholic prelate
- Raymond Burke (priest) (died 1562), Irish priest
- Ray Burke (Irish politician) (Raphael Patrick Burke, born 1943), Irish politician
