= Sylvester of Worcester =

13th-century Bishop of Worcester

Sylvester
- Bishop of Worcester
- Elected: 3 April 1216
- Installed: 8 September 1216
- Term ended: 16 July 1218
- Predecessor: Walter de Grey
- Successor: William de Blois
- Previous post: Prior of Worcester

Orders
- Consecration: 3 July 1216

Personal details
- Died: 16 July 1218
- Denomination: Catholic

Sylvester was a medieval Bishop of Worcester.

Sylvester was elected Prior of Worcester on 21 January 1215. He was elected to the see of Worcester on 3 April 1216 and consecrated on 3 July 1216. He was enthroned at Worcester Cathedral on 8 September 1216. He died on 16 July 1218.

== Citations ==
Catholic Church titles
Preceded by Walter de Grey	Bishop of Worcester; 1216–1218	Succeeded by William de Blois
