= Christopher Isaack =

Irish Anglican priest (1691–1740)

Christopher Isaack (1691–1740) was an Irish Anglican priest in the 18th century.

Isaack was born in Dublin, and educated at Trinity College there. A prebendary of Emly, he was its archdeacon from 1740 his death.
