= Maurice Hurley (bishop) =

Most Reverend Maurice Hurley
- Bishop of Emly
- Church: Catholic Church
- In office: 1623–1646
- Predecessor: See vacant since 1586
- Successor: Terence O'Brien (bishop)

Orders
- Consecration: 7 September 1623 by David Rothe

Personal details
- Died: 1646 Emly, Ireland

Maurice Hurley (died 1586) was a 17th-century Roman Catholic prelate.

He served as Bishop of Emly: from his consecration on 7 September 1623 until his death in September 1646. There is a stone in memory of him in the wall at St Ailbe's National School, which was taken from Emly Cathedral when it was demolished in 1827.
