= Anglican Diocese of Worcester =

Diocese of the Church of England

Diocese of Worcester Dioecesis Wigorniensis
- Coat of arms

- Flag

Location
- Country: United Kingdom
- Ecclesiastical province: Canterbury
- Archdeaconries: Dudley, Worcester
- Coordinates: 52.192°N 2.224°W

Statistics
- Parishes: 180
- Churches: 284

Information
- Denomination: Church of England
- Cathedral: Worcester Cathedral
- Language: English

Current leadership
- Bishop: Hugh Nelson
- Suffragan: Martin Gorick, Bishop of Dudley
- Dean: Stephen Edwards
- Archdeacons: Nikki Groarke, Archdeacon of Dudley; Mark Badger, Archdeacon of Worcester

Website
- cofe-worcester.org.uk

The Diocese of Worcester forms part of the Church of England (Anglican) Province of Canterbury in England.

The diocese was founded around 679 by St Theodore of Canterbury at Worcester to minister to the kingdom of the Hwicce, one of the many Anglo Saxon petty-kingdoms of that time. The original borders of the diocese are believed to be based on those of that ancient kingdom.

Covering an area of 671 square miles (1,740 km^{2}) it currently has parishes in:

- the County of Worcestershire
- the Metropolitan Borough of Dudley
- northern Gloucestershire
- urban villages along the edge of the south-east of the Metropolitan Borough of Wolverhampton
- the Metropolitan Borough of Sandwell

Currently the diocese has 190 parishes with 281 churches and 163 stipendiary clergy.

The diocese is divided into two archdeaconries:

- the Archdeaconry of Worcester
- the Archdeaconry of Dudley

On its creation the diocese included what is now southern and western Warwickshire (an area known as Felden). On 24 January 1837 the north and east of Warwickshire (Arden) which formed the Archdeaconry of Coventry in the then Diocese of Lichfield and Coventry was transferred to the Diocese of Worcester. In 1905 an area in northern Warwickshire was split off as the Diocese of Birmingham and in 1918 an area approximate to the rest of Warwickshire was made the Diocese of Coventry. From 1993 until 2002, the diocese operated an episcopal area scheme.

== Bishops ==
On 29 July 2025, it was announced that Hugh Nelson, the Bishop suffragan of St Germans in the Diocese of Truro, would be the next Bishop of Worcester. His installation service took place in Worcester Cathedral on 17 January 2026.

Beside the Bishop suffragan of Dudley, which See was created in 1974, there are three retired bishops resident in (or near) the diocese who are licensed to serve as honorary assistant bishops:

- 2002–present: Christopher Mayfield, retired Bishop of Manchester and former area/suffragan Bishop of Wolverhampton, lives in Worcester.
- 2005–present: Jonathan Ruhumuliza, a Rwandan bishop, lives and works as a parish priest in Worcestershire.
- 2009–present: Michael Hooper, retired Bishop of Ludlow, lives in Eckington.

From 1994, alternative episcopal oversight for parishes in the diocese which do not accept the sacramental ministry of women priests was provided by the provincial episcopal visitor, the Bishop of Ebbsfleet, who was licensed as an honorary assistant bishop of the diocese in order to facilitate his ministry. Since a reorganisation in January 2023 oversight passed to a new Bishop of Oswestry (Paul Thomas) who continues to serve the Worcester diocese in his place.

== History ==
The Diocese of Worcester, founded in 679–680, bore the title Episcopus Hwicciorum. The boundaries are believed to have been roughly those of the Kingdom of the Hwicce.

The diocese seems to have benefited in the 8th century from the support of the kings of Mercia. Through royal support the bishopric was able to gradually extend its control over prominent minsters. Initially, these were under the control of Hwiccan royals, as family property. This appears to have been gradually transferred to the control of the Bishopric, under the sponsorship of the Mercian kings, the process driven by the self-interest of the Mercian monarchy. As well as undermining local rivals, the Mercian kings also derived revenue from church lands in this period.

The church in Worcester is believed to have been founded in the late 7th century. It seems to have benefited in the 8th century from the support of the kings of Mercia. Through this royal support the bishopric found itself in a position from which it was able to gradually extend its control over several of the other prominent minsters in the area during the 7th and 8th centuries. Consequently, in the 9th century, the bishopric of Worcester can be seen to be the most powerful ecclesiastical power in Mercia during this time. From this position the church was able to use its great wealth to buy privileges from the kings of Mercia. Later in the period it was from Mercia, in particular Worcester, that King Alfred began to recruit priests and monks with whom to rebuild the church in Wessex during the 880s (Asser, ch. 77). It has been argued that these priests brought with them a new attitude towards the church's place within society and its relationship with the monarchy. Consequently, from the bishopric of Worcester there developed a new ecclesiastical ideology that would become the accepted Anglo-Saxon church.

The chaos of the period 900–1060 led to the loss of ecclesiastical lands, through leases and loss of records. Leases were often made for three lifetimes, but tended to become permanent arrangements. The result was that by Domesday, some 45% of the Diocese's church lands were held under leases.

=== Bishop Roger and Thomas Becket ===
Bishop Roger attempted to support Thomas Becket in his dispute with Henry II over the independence of the Church. He wrote to the King to intercede on behalf of Becket after his exile, which provoked Henry to instruct him to keep away from Becket in his exile. Roger ignored the instruction, and was in turn exiled. He remained in exile, despite attempts by the Pope to reconcile him with Henry, and eventually was sent to Rome by the King after Becket's murder to attempt to convince the Pope that he was not involved.

=== The diocese and the medieval Jewry ===
Worcester had a small Jewish population by the late 12th century. It was one of a number of places allowed to keep records of debts, in an official locked chest known as an archa. (An archa or arca (plural archae/arcae) was a municipal chest in which deeds were preserved.) Jewish life probably centred around what is now Copenhagen Street.

The diocese was notably hostile to the Jewish community in Worcester. Peter of Blois was commissioned by a Bishop of Worcester, probably John of Coutances, to write a significant anti-Judaic treatise Against the Perfidy of Jews around 1190.

William de Blois, as Bishop of Worcester, imposed particularly strict rules on Jews within the diocese in 1219. As elsewhere in England, Jews were officially compelled to wear square white badges, supposedly representing tabulae. In most places, this requirement was relinquished as long as fines were paid. In addition to enforcing the church laws on wearing badges, Blois tried to impose additional restrictions on usury, and wrote to Pope Gregory in 1229 to ask for better enforcement and further, harsher measures. In response, the papacy demanded that Christians be prevented from working in Jewish homes, "lest temporal profit be preferred to the zeal of Christ", and enforcement of the wearing of badges.

=== Dissolution and Reformation ===
The priory came to an end with King Henry VIII's Dissolution of the Monasteries. Shortly beforehand, in 1535, the prior William More resigned, and was replaced by Henry Holbeach. More had a reputation for fine living, although his standards seem in line with other senior ecclesiasts of the time. However, there certainly were problems with the administration of the priory, including divisions within the community.

The Protestant Hugh Latimer was bishop from 1535, and preached for reform and iconoclasm. He resigned as bishop in 1539, as a result of a theological turn by Henry VIII towards Roman Catholicism, in the Six Articles. John Bell, a moderate reformer, was bishop from 1539 to 1543, during the period of the Priory's dissolution.

In the early 16th century, Worcester had around 40 monks. This declined slightly in the years immediately before 1540, as recruitment seems to have halted. There were 35 Benedictine monks plus the Prior Holbeach at the time of dissolution, probably 16 January 1540; eleven were immediately given pensions, while the remainder became secular canons in the new Royal College. Holbeach was re-appointed as the first dean. A further five former monks were pensioned from the college in July 1540.

The former monastic library of Worcester contained a considerable number of manuscripts which are, among other libraries, now scattered over Cambridge, London (British Library), Oxford Bodleian, and the Cathedral library at Worcester of today. Remains of the Priory dating from the 12th and 13th centuries can still be seen.

John Bell's successor as bishop, Nicholas Heath, was religiously much more conservative and Catholic.

Having been divided from the Worcester diocese in 1541, the Diocese of Gloucester was briefly dissolved and returned to Worcester again on 20 May 1552 — John Hooper was translated from Gloucester and called "Bishop of Worcester and Gloucester" (or Gloucester and Worcester) until his own deprivation by Queen Mary in 1554. Worcester and Gloucester were re-divided again at that point.

== Worcester Archive ==
The Charters of Worcester are one of the key sources for historians studying the period and are a major reason for information about the early Anglo-Saxon church. The charters exist within the Worcester archive which is itself the largest Anglo-Saxon archive of its kind. It contains many texts, ranging from late 7th to the 11th centuries, providing a significant and continuous history of the church.

The archive takes physical form in two distinct cartularies. The first one, Cartulary A (Cotton Tiberius A xiii), contains in it the majority of the charters that make up the archive. It is from these that there develops a coherent picture of land ownership and societal responsibilities during the Anglo-Saxon period and beyond. A prominent example of this is No. 95 of Cartulary A which shows the 8th-century king of Mercia, Ceolwulf II, granting the bishopric of Worcester exemption from royal dues in exchange for money. This example shows not just the dues and power of the king himself but also the wealth and power of the church, the sophisticated system of bartering and exchange that existed at the time and also the legal system of recording important transactions.

== Sources ==
- MacDonald, Alec (1969) [1943], Worcestershire in English History (Reprint ed.), London: SR Publishers, ISBN 978-0854095759
- John Noake (1866), The monastery and cathedral of Worcester., London: Longman, OL 7145051M
- Thomas Dingley (1867), History from marble., [Westminster]: Printed for the Camden Society, LCCN 17001261, OL 14133074M
- Worcester Cathedral (official guidebook), Scala Publishers Ltd. (2004) ISBN 1-85759-347-2
- Tatton-Brown, Tim; John Crook (2002). The English Cathedral. New Holland Publishers. ISBN 1-84330-120-2.
- R.K. Morris, ed. Medieval Art and Architecture at Worcester Cathedral, 1978
- Thornton, David E (2018), "The Last Monks of Worcester Cathedral Priory", Midland History, 43 (1), Routledge: 3–21, doi:10.1080/0047729X.2018.1461774, hdl:11693/50072, S2CID 159893638
- Clifton-Taylor, Alec (1967). The Cathedrals of England (2nd ed.). Thames and Hudson Ltd. ISBN 978-0500200629.
- Ker, Neil Ripley, ed. (1964). Medieval Libraries of Great Britain. Royal Historical Society. pp. 205–215.
- Dyer, Christopher (2008). Lords and Peasants in a Changing Society: The Estates of the Bishopric of Worcester, 680-1540. Cambridge: Cambridge University Press. ISBN 978-0521072441.

=== Jewish history ===
- Vincent, Nicholas (1994). "Two Papal Letters on the Wearing of the Jewish Badge, 1221 and 1229". Jewish Historical Studies. 34: 209–24. JSTOR 29779960.
- Mundill, Robin R (2002). England's Jewish Solution: Experiment and Expulsion, 1262-1290. Cambridge University Press. ISBN 978-0-521-52026-3.
- de Blois, Peter (1194). "Against the Perfidy of the Jews". Medieval Sourcebook. University of Fordham. "A treatise addressed to John Bishop of Worcester, probably John of Coutances who held that See, 1194-8."
- Lazare, Bernard (1903), Antisemitism, its history and causes., New York: The International library publishing co., LCCN 03015369, OCLC 3055229, OL 7137045M
