= Archdiocese of Cashel and Emly =

The Archdiocese of Cashel and Emly or Archdiocese of Cashel can refer to:

- Roman Catholic Archdiocese of Cashel and Emly (since 1718)
- Archdiocese of Cashel and Emly (Church of Ireland) (1568–1838)
- Bishop of Cashel (disambiguation) (before 1568/1718)
