= Bishop of Cashel =

Bishop of Cashel can refer to:

- Roman Catholic Archdiocese of Cashel and Emly and its predecessors
- Bishop of Cashel and Ossory in the Church of Ireland (1977 to date)
- Bishop of Cashel and Waterford in the Church of Ireland (1839-1977)

== See also ==
- Archbishop of Cashel
