= Henry Holbeach =

British bishop

The Right Reverend Henry Holbeach
- Bishop of Lincoln
- Church: Church of England
- Diocese: Lincoln
- Elected: c. 1547
- Installed: c. 1547
- Term ended: 1551 (death)
- Predecessor: John Longland
- Successor: John Taylor
- Other posts: Prior of Worcester (1536–1540); Bishop suffragan of Bristol (1538–1544); Dean of Worcester (1542–1544); Bishop of Rochester (1544–1547)

Orders
- Consecration: 24 March 1537 by John Hilsey

Personal details
- Born: Henry Rands c. 1477 Holbeach, Lincolnshire, England
- Died: 2 August 1551 Nettleham, Lincolnshire, England
- Buried: 7 August 1551, Nettleham
- Denomination: Anglican

Henry Holbeach (c. 1477 – 2 August 1551) was an English clergyman who served as the last Prior and first Dean of Worcester, a suffragan bishop, and diocesan bishop of two Church of England dioceses.

== Life ==
Born as Henry Rands (or Randes) in Holbeach, Lincolnshire, he assumed the name of his birthplace on becoming a monk at Crowland Abbey. He proceeded to Cambridge (Bachelor of Theology (BTh) 1527, Doctor of Theology (DTh) 1534), and became prior of Buckingham College, Cambridge.

In 1536, he was elected the Prior of Worcester, and two years later he also became the Bishop of Bristol, a suffragan bishop in the Diocese of Worcester. Following the Dissolution of the Monasteries in 1540, the priory was re-established as a cathedral with Holbeach becoming the first Dean of Worcester in 1542. In 1544, he became Bishop of Rochester, and finally in 1547 Bishop of Lincoln.

== Marriage ==
He is believed to have been the first of the English (post reformation) bishops to have been married, his wife Joan proving his will on 5 October 1551 and he left a son Thomas Randes. According to his descendant, Cater Rand, he was "one of the compilers of the liturgy". Holbeach developed the sweating sickness and died on 2 August 1551 at Nettleham (some accounts give 6 August as date of death) and was buried there on 7 August 1551.

Church of England titles
New title	Bishop of Bristol; 1538–1544	Diocese of Bristol erected
Preceded by Nicholas Heath	Bishop of Rochester; 1544–1547	Succeeded by Nicholas Ridley
Preceded by John Longland	Bishop of Lincoln; 1547–1551	Succeeded by John Taylor
