= Emly Cathedral =

- Cathedral Church of St Alibeus
- Emly Cathedral
- 52°27′47″N 8°21′06″W
- Location: Emly, County Tipperary
- Country: Ireland
- Denomination: Church of Ireland

History
- Dedication: Ailbe of Emly

Administration
- Province: Province of Dublin
- Diocese: Diocese of Tuam, Killala and Achonry

Emly Cathedral, is a former cathedral in Ireland. It was formerly in the Diocese of Emly, then the Archdiocese of Cashel and then the Diocese of Cashel and Waterford It was destroyed by fire in 1192, again in 1827 and by 1876 was completely disused.

== Notes ==
=== Works cited ===
- Brady, W. Maziere (1876). The Episcopal Succession in England, Scotland and Ireland, A.D. 1400 to 1875. Vol. 2. Rome: Tipografia Della Pace.
