= Raymond Burke (priest) =

Irish Roman Catholic and Anglican cleric and Bishop of Emly (d.1562)

The Most Reverend Raymond Burke OFM
- Church: Roman Catholic Church
- See: Bishop of Emly
- In office: 1550–1562
- Predecessor: Angus O'Hernan
- Successor: see vacant

Personal details
- Born: Raymond Burke
- Died: 28 July 1562

Raymond Burke, O.F.M. (died 28 July 1562) was an Irish Roman Catholic and Anglican priest who was Bishop of Emly (1550–62).

== Career ==
Burke was a member of the Order of Friars Minor and was appointed Bishop of Emly by the Holy See on 20 October 1550, recognised by the crown in the reign of Queen Mary I, later described as an 'adherent of Queen Elizabeth' and died in office on 28 July 1562.

== See also ==
- House of Burgh, an Anglo-Norman and Hiberno-Norman dynasty founded in 1193
- Catholic Church in Ireland

Catholic Church titles
Preceded by Angus O'Hernan	Bishop of Emly; 1550–1562	Succeeded by See vacant
