= Angus O'Hernan =

Angus O'Hernan was an Irish Anglican priest in the seventeenth century. He was nominated Bishop of Emly by King Henry VIII on 6 October 1542, appointed by letters patent on 6 April 1543 and died in office in 1553.
