= William More (prior) =

William More (1472–1559?), prior of Worcester, son of Richard and Ann Peers or Peres, entered the Worcester priory in 1488 at the age of sixteen; was kitchener in 1504, sub-prior under John Wednesbury (1507–18), and was made prior 2 October 1518. He spent large sums on repairs, on plate for the churches upon the monastery's estates, and on books, including printed books for the convent. He was fond of comfort, amusement, and display.

A letter from a monk, John Musard, written while in prison, which has been printed by Noake, contains a list of complaints against a certain 'untrue master,' who is clearly identical with More, for one charge is that he made a new mitre, a needless extravagance, and the costs of this mitre are entered in More's diary. Musard complains, too, of the prior's gifts to his relations, of the sale of the monastery's plate, and of neglect of the buildings. Musard had been put in prison by More in 1531. In February 1532 More served in the commission of the peace for Worcestershire.

Foreseeing the dissolution, he resigned in 1535 on condition that he was allowed a well-furnished room in the monastery, with a supply of fuel, and exemption from a debt of 100 shillings; and that his house at Crowle should be repaired. More died after 1558, and was buried in Crowle Church.

The dean and chapter of Worcester possess an English journal and account-book, written by More, from which selections have been published.
