= Priors of Worcester =

This is a list of priors of Worcester, until the Benedictine Order's dissolution in 1540.

List of priors of Worcester Cathedral
Name	Appointed	Retired	Notes
Wulfstan		1062	Became Bishop of Worcester
Ælfstan	1062	1080	Brother of Wulfstan and probably succeeded him as prior
Thomas	1080	d.1113	
Nicholas	c.1116	d.1124	
Warin	Before 1133	Around 1140-42	
Ralph of Bath	1142	d.1143	
David	1143	Deposed 1145	
Osbert	1145	d.1146	
Ralph de Bedeford	1146	d.1189	
M. Senatus	1189	d.1207	
Peter	1196	Deposed 1203	
Randulph of Evesham	1203	1214	Became Abbott of Evesham
Silvester of Evesham	1215	1216	Became Bishop of Worcester
Simon Pimme	1216	Deposed 1220-22	Appealed to Pope unsuccessfully, died 1223
William Norman	1222	resigned 1224	Appointed by Bishop, quarrelled with the convent, arguments settled 1224
William de Bedeforde	1224	d.1242	
Richard de Gundicote	1242	d.1252	
Thomas	1252	d.1260	
Richard de Dumbleton	1260	1272	
William de Cirencester	1272	d.1274	
Richard de Feckenham	1274	d.1286	
Philip de Aubyn	1287	d.1296	
Simon de Wyre	1296	resigned 1301	
John de Wyke	1301	1317	
Wulstan de Bransford	1317	1338/9	Became Bishop of Worcester
Simon de Botiler	1339	1339	
Simon Crompe	1339	1340	
John de Evesham	1340	1370	
Walter de Legh	1370	1388	
John Green	1388	1395	
John de Malvern	1395		
John de Fordham		1438	
Thomas Ledbury	1438	1444	
John Hertelbury	1444	1455	
Thomas Musard	1455	1469	
Robert Multon	1469	1492	
William Wenlocke	1492	1499	
Thomas Mildenham	1499	1507	
John Wednesbury	1507	1518	
William More	1518	1536	
Henry Holbeach	1536	1540	

== Sources ==
Primary sources

- More, William (1914), Fegan, Ethel S (ed.), Journal of Prior William More., London: Printed for the Worcestershire Historical Society, by M. Hughes and Clarke, OL 23307603M

Secondary sources

- Greatrex, Joan (1997). Biographical Register of English Cathedral Priories of the Province of Canterbury c.1066-1540. Oxford, UK: Clarendon Press. ISBN 978-0-19-820424-4.
- Greenway, Diana E, ed. (1971). "Priors of Worcester". Fasti Ecclesiae Anglicanae 1066-1300: Volume 2, Monastic Cathedrals (Northern and Southern Provinces). London: British History Online. pp. 102–104.
- Jones, B, ed. (1963). "Priors of Worcester". Fasti Ecclesiae Anglicanae 1300-1541: Volume 4, Monastic Cathedrals (Southern Province). London: British History Online. pp. 59–60.
- Winterbottom, Michael; Thomson, Rodney, eds. (2002). "Life of Wulfstan". William of Malmesbury: Saints’ Lives (in Latin and English). Oxford, UK: Clarendon Press. pp. 1–155. ISBN 978-0-19-820709-2.
