= Bishop of Emly =

The Bishop of Emly (Irish: Imleach Iubhair; Latin: Imilicensis) was a separate episcopal title which took its name after the village of Emly in County Tipperary, Ireland. In both the Catholic Church and the Church of Ireland, it has been united with other sees.

== History ==
The monastery in Emly was founded by Saint Ailbe in the 6th century. After his death there was a succession of abbots of Emly, a few of whom were also consecrated as bishops. In 1118, the Diocese of Emly became one of the twenty-four dioceses established at the Synod of Ráth Breasail. The diocese's boundaries were formally set out by the Synod of Kells in 1152, and consisted of a small portion of west County Tipperary, east County Limerick and southeast County Clare.

After the Reformation in Ireland there were parallel apostolic successions: one of the Catholic Church and the other of the Church of Ireland.

In the Catholic Church, the see of Emly had an unsettled history from the mid-16th to the early 18th century. During that period, there were only three bishops and one vicar apostolic appointed, one of whom was executed. In 1695, James Stritch was nominated to be bishop, but is doubtful if he took possession of the see. The rest of the time there were long periods the see was vacant or administered by the archbishops of Cashel. On 10 May 1718, Pope Clement XI decreed the union of the sees of Cashel and Emly.

In the Church of Ireland, the see of Emly was united to the archepiscopal see of Cashel by an Act of Parliament in 1568. Under the Church Temporalities (Ireland) Act 1833 (3 & 4 Will. 4. c. 37), the bishopric of Waterford and Lismore was united to the archbishopric of Cashel and Emly on 14 August 1833. On the death of Archbishop Laurence in 1838, the archepiscopal see lost its metropolitan status and became the bishopric of Cashel and Waterford. Through reorganisation in the Church of Ireland in 1976, the bishopric of Emly was transferred to the bishopric of Limerick and Killaloe.

== Pre-Reformation bishops ==
Pre-Reformation Bishops of Emly
From	Until	Incumbent	Notes
unknown	1114	Diarmait Ua Flainn Chua	Also Abbot of Emly. Died in office.
before 1152	unknown	Gilla in Choimded Ua hArdmaíl	Known in Latin as Deicola. Present at the Synod of Kells in March 1152. Died in office.
unknown	1163	Máel Ísa Ua Laigenáin, O.Cist.	Died in office.
before 1172	1173	Ua Meic Stia	Became bishop before 1172. Died in office.
before 1192	1197	Ragnall Ua Flainn Chua	Also known as Reginald O'Flanua. He was bishop when Emly Cathedral was burnt down in 1192. Died in office.
before 1205	after 1209	M.	The bishop's name is unknown just by the initial letter "M.", which may stand for Máel Ísu. There is also mention in a document, dated 1302, of Isaac Ua hAnmchada (anglicised: Isaac O'Hanmy) as an early 13th-century bishop of Emly.
c.1209	1211	(William)	Canon of Emly. Elected circa 1209, but annulled by Pope Innocent III on 5 January 1211.
1212	1227	Henry, O.Cist.	Formerly Abbot of Bindon, England. Elected and consecrated in 1212. During his episcopate, he obtained from King John the privilege for the town of Emly to hold fairs and markets. Died in office before 13 July 1227.
1228	1236	John Collingham	Formerly Chancellor of Emly Cathedral. Elected bishop before 13 July 1228, despite opposition from the Crown, and confirmed by Pope Gregory IX in that year. Consecrated before 25 June 1228 and received the temporalities after 25 June 1230. Died in office before 14 June 1236.
1238		(Daniel)	Prior of the Hospital of St John, Dublin. Elected before April and received the temporalities after 8 April 1238, but did not get possession of the see.
1238	1249	Christianus	Elected before 18 October 1238. Died in office before 12 December 1249.
1251	1265	Gilbertus	Also known as Gilbert O'Doverty. Formerly Dean of Emly. Elected bishop before 12 October 1251 and received the temporalities on that date. Died in office on 9 October 1265.
1266		(Laurentius 'of Dunlak)	Precentor of Emly. Elected before 30 March 1266, but was never consecrated.
1266	1272	Florentius Ó hAirt	Formerly a canon of Emly. Elected and confirmed bishop before 17 April 1266 and received the temporalities after that date. Consecrated circa Whitsuntide 1266. Died in office on 18 January 1272.
1272	1275	Matthaeus Mac Gormáin	Also known as Matthew MacGormain. Formerly Archdeacon of Emly. Elected and confirmed after 3 April and received the temporalities on 18 June 1272. Died in office on 24 March 1275.
1275	1281	David Ó Cossaig. O.Cist	Formerly Abbot of Holy Cross Abbey, Tipperary. Elected before 24 June and received the temporalities on 2 August 1275. Died in office on 11 June 1281.
1286	1306	William de Clifford	Appointed on 1 October 1286. Died in office before 10 August 1306.
1306	1309	Thomas Cantock	Elected before 3 September 1306 and received the temporalities on that date. Also Lord Chancellor of Ireland (1292–1294 and 1306–1308). Died in office on 4 February 1309.
1309	1335	William Roughead	Elected before 14 May 1309 and received the temporalities on that date. Died in office on 15 June 1335.
1335	1356	Richard le Walleys	Also recorded as Thomas Walsh. Elected before 16 August 1335 and received the temporalities on that date. Died in office before 15 March 1356.
1356	1362	John Esmond	Formerly Bishop of Ferns. Appointed Bishop of Emly on 11 January 1353, but did not get possession. Appointed again on 28 February 1356 and received the temporalities on 27 April 1356. Died in office on 4 April 1362.
1362	1363	David Penlyn	Also recorded as David Foynlyn. Formerly a canon of Emly. Appointed bishop on 4 July 1362 and consecrated before June 1363. Died in office.
1363	1405	William	Formerly Archdeacon of Emly. Appointed bishop on 7 June and received the temporalities on 11 October 1363. Died in office before December 1405.
1405	1421	Nicholas Ball	Translated from Ardfert & Aghadoe on 2 December 1405. Died in office in April 1421.
1421		(John Rishberry, O.E.S.A.)	Appointed on 21 April 1421, but the papal bulls were not expedited.
1422	1425	Robert Windell, O.F.M.	Appointed on 14 January 1423. Acted as a suffragan bishop in the English dioceses of Norwich (1424), Worcester (1433), and Salisbury (1435–41). Deprived of the see in 1425 and died in 1441.
1425	1444	Thomas de Burgh, O.S.A.	Also recorded as Thomas de Burgo. Formerly a canon regular of Clare Abbey. Appointed on 19 December 1425 and consecrated after 23 February 1428. Died in office in September 1444.
1429		(Robert Portland, O.F.M.)	Appointed on 5 March 1429, but did not take effect. Later appointed titular bishop of Tiberias in 1444 and acted as a suffragan bishop in the English diocese of Worcester (1456).
1444	1448	Cornelius Ó Cuinnlis, O.F.M.	Appointed on 11 September 1444 and consecrated before 16 January 1445. Translated to Clonfert on 30 August 1448.
1448	1449	Conchobair Ó Maolalaidh, O.F.M.	Translated from Clonfert on 30 August 1448. Afterwards translated to Elphin on 20 October 1448.
1449	1475	William Ó hEidheáin	Also recorded as William O Hetigan. Translated from Elphin on 20 October 1449. Died in office after February 1475.
1476	1494	Pilib Ó Cathail	Appointed on 1 December and consecrated after 9 January 1476. Died in office before November 1494.
1494	1498	Donatus Mac Briain	Appointed on 10 November 1494. Resigned before April 1498. Later acted as a suffragan bishop of the Worcester (1500).
1498	1505	Cinnéidigh Mac Briain	Also recorded as Carolus. Formerly a canon of Emly. Appointed bishop on 30 April 1498. Died in office before October 1505.
1505	1542	Thomas O'Hurley	Also known as Tomás Ó hUrthaile. Appointed on 6 October 1505 and consecrated circa 1507. Swore the Oath of Supremacy at Clonmel early in 1539. Died in office in 1542.

== Post-Reformation bishops ==
=== Catholic succession ===
Catholic Bishops of Emly
From	Until	Incumbent	Notes
1542	1550–1551	See vacant	
1550–1551	1562	Raymond Burke, O.F.M. ^{[B]}	Also known as Raymond de Burgh and Raymond de Burgo. Appointed on 20 October 1550 or 19 January 1551. Died in office on 23 or 28 July 1562.
1562	1567	See vacant	
1567	1586	Maurice MacBrien	Also recorded as Maurice O'Brien. Appointed on 24 January 1567 and consecrated on 7 October 1671. Died in office in 1586.
1586	1620	See vacant	There is no record of vicars apostolic during this period, and was perhaps administered by the archbishops of Cashel.
1620	1646	Maurice Hurley	Also recorded as Maurice O'Hurley. Appointed on 1 June 1620 and consecrated on 7 September 1623. Died in office in September 1646.
1647	1651	Bl. Terence Albert O'Brien, O.P.	Appointed coadjutor bishop (with rights of succession) on 11 March 1647, the Holy See not knowing Bishop O'Hurley had already died. O'Brien was consecrated on 2 April 1648. He was executed on 26 November 1651 and was Beatified on 27 September 1992.
1651	1657	See vacant	
1657	1669	(William Burgat)	Appointed vicar apostolic of the see of Emly by a papal brief on 17 April 1657, and re-appointed on 24 November 1665. Became Archbishop of Cashel on 11 January 1669.
1669	2015	See administered by the archbishops of Cashel	
1695		(James Stritch)	Nominated by the Propaganda Fide on 3 or 30 August 1695. There is no record of his consecration, and is doubtful he ever took possession of the see.
from 2015		The see became part of the new Archdiocese of Cashel and Emly	

=== Church of Ireland succession ===
Church of Ireland Bishops of Emly
From	Until	Incumbent	Notes
1543	1553	Angus O'Hernan	Also recorded as Aeneas. Nominated by King Henry VIII on 6 October 1542 and appointed by letters patent on 6 April 1543. Died in office in 1553.
1553	1562	Raymond Burke ^{[A]}	Also recorded as Raymond de Burgh and Raymond de Burgo. Appointed by Holy See on 20 October 1550 or 19 January 1551. Presumably recognised by the crown in the reign of Queen Mary I. In a letter of 12 October 1561, the papal legate Fr David Wolfe SJ described all the bishops in Munster as 'adherents of the Queen'. Died in office on 23 or 28 July 1562.
1562	1568	See vacant	
1568	1838	See part of the Anglican archbishopric of Cashel	
1838	1976	See part of the Anglican bishopric of Cashel and Waterford	
since 1976		See part of the Anglican bishopric of Limerick and Killaloe	

== Notes ==
- ^{A} ^{B} Raymond Burke was bishop of both successions when they were reunited during the reign of Queen Mary I.

== Bibliography ==
- Brady, W. Maziere (1876). The Episcopal Succession in England, Scotland and Ireland, A.D. 1400 to 1875. Vol. 2. Rome: Tipografia Della Pace.
- Cotton, Henry (1851). The Province of Munster. Fasti Ecclesiae Hiberniae: The Succession of the Prelates and Members of the Cathedral Bodies of Ireland. Vol. 1 (2nd ed.). Dublin: Hodges and Smith.
- Fryde, E. B.; Greenway, D. E.; Porter, S.; Roy, I., eds. (1986). Handbook of British Chronology (3rd, reprinted 2003 ed.). Cambridge: Cambridge University Press. ISBN 0-521-56350-X.
- Moody, T. W.; Martin, F. X.; Byrne, F. J., eds. (1984). Maps, Genealogies, Lists: A Companion to Irish History, Part II. New History of Ireland. Vol. 9. Oxford: Oxford University Press. ISBN 0-19-821745-5.
