= William de Blois (bishop of Worcester) =

13th-century Bishop of Worcester

- Bishop of Worcester
- Elected: c. 25 August 1218
- Term ended: August 1236
- Predecessor: Sylvester of Worcester
- Successor: Walter de Cantilupe
- Previous post: Archdeacon of Buckingham

Orders
- Consecration: 7 October 1218

Personal details
- Died: 17 or 18 August 1236
- Denomination: Catholic

William de Blois was a medieval Bishop of Worcester.

== Life ==
William was a canon of the diocese of Lincoln and held the office of Archdeacon of Buckingham in that diocese by 10 May 1206. Presumably he was related to William de Blois, Bishop of Lincoln, but the exact relationship is unknown.

William was elected to the see of Worcester sometime around 25 August 1218 and his election was confirmed by the papal legate to England Guala. He was consecrated on 7 October 1218. He died on 17 or 18 August 1236 or on 17 August.

In 1224 William was appointed Sheriff of Staffordshire and Shropshire.

While Bishop of Worcester, William imposed particularly strict rules on Jews within the diocese in 1219. As elsewhere in England, Jews were officially compelled to wear square white badges, supposedly representing tabula. Blois attempted to impose additional restrictions on usury, and wrote to Pope Gregory in 1229 to ask for further, harsher measures, and complaining about lack of enforcement of measures in Canterbury. In response, the papacy demanded that Christians be prevented from working in Jewish homes, and for enforcement of the wearing of badges.

== Citations ==
Catholic Church titles
Preceded by Sylvester of Worcester	Bishop of Worcester; 1218–1236	Succeeded by Walter de Cantilupe
