= Clive (disambiguation) =

Clive is a given name and surname (the article includes a list of people and fictional characters with the name).

Clive may also refer to:

== Places ==
- Clive, New South Wales, Australia
  - Clive County, New South Wales, Australia
- Clive, Alberta, Canada
- Clive, New Zealand
  - Clive (New Zealand electorate)
  - Clive River, in Hawke's Bay, New Zealand
- Clive, Cheshire, a location in England, UK (suburb of Winsford)
- Clive, Shropshire, England, UK
- Clive, Iowa, U.S.
- Clive, Utah, U.S.

== Rivers ==
- Clive River, New Zealand

== Other uses ==
- Clive, an East India Company ship that carried explorer Francis Light to the east
- HMIS Clive (L79), a Royal Indian Navy sloop which served in the Second World War
- Baron Clive and Viscount Clive, subsidiary titles of the Earl of Powis

== See also ==
- Clive of India (Robert Clive, 1st Baron Clive, 1725–1774), the first British Governor of the Bengal Presidency
