= Clyve =

Clyve is a surname. Notable people with the surname include:

- John Clyve, English Gothic architect
- John Clyve (MP) for Bristol (UK Parliament constituency)
- Richard de Clyve, English medieval university chancellor
- Geoffrey de Clyve (died 1119), English bishop

== See also ==
- Clive
