= John Mark Ainsley =

English lyric tenor (born 1963)

- Born: 9 July 1963 (age 63); Crewe, Cheshire, England
- Education: Magdalen College, Oxford
- Occupation: Operatic tenor
- Known for: Opera performance, especially Baroque and Early music
- Style: Lyric tenor
- Spouse: William Whitehead
- Awards: Munich Festival Prize (2007); Royal Philharmonic Society Singer Award (2007)

John Mark Ainsley OBE (born 9 July 1963) is an English lyric tenor. Known for his supple voice, Ainsley is particularly admired for his interpretations of baroque music and the works of Wolfgang Amadeus Mozart. In the course of his career, he has gravitated towards 20th-century music, singing in operas by Henze, Janáček, and Britten.

== Early life and education ==
Ainsley was born in Crewe, Cheshire, the son of an Anglican priest and a teacher. He spent most of his childhood in Worcester and was educated at the Royal Grammar School Worcester (singing in the Worcester Cathedral Voluntary Choir), and Magdalen College, Oxford. He studied privately with Anthony Rolfe Johnson for five years and went to sing as a lay clerk at Christ Church. He later spent some time in Chicago where he studied with Diane Forlano, who remains his teacher to this day.

== Career ==
Ainsley made his official solo debut in 1987 when he sang in Stravinsky's Mass under Simon Rattle. After further engagements with Gothic Voices and other groups he made his professional opera debut in 1988 as Armindo in Scarlatti's Gli equivoci nel sembiante at Innsbruck's Early Music Festival. This was followed by his debut with English National Opera the following year as Eurimaco in Il ritorno d'Ulisse in patria, and his United States debut in 1990 in a series of concerts in Boston and New York. He has subsequently performed all around the world in operas and concerts. In 1992 he made his debut with the Berlin Philharmonic under Haitink and created the tenor part in the world premiere of John Tavener's We shall see Him as He is. The following year he made his debut in the Vienna Musikverein, singing the Evangelist in Bach's St Matthew Passion and tenor solos in the St John Passion under Peter Schreier. Other notable concert appearances include performances with the London Philharmonic under Roger Norrington, the London Symphony under Sir Colin Davis, Mstislav Rostropovich and André Previn, Les Musiciens du Louvre under Marc Minkowski, the Cleveland Orchestra under Franz Welser-Möst, the New York Philharmonic under Kurt Masur, the Boston Symphony under Seiji Ozawa, the San Francisco Symphony under Jeffrey Tate, the Vienna Philharmonic under Trevor Pinnock, the Academy of St Martin in the Fields under Neville Marriner, and both the Orchestra of the Maggio Musicale Fiorentino and the Orchestre de Paris under Carlo Maria Giulini among many others.

His opera appearances include the role of Idamantes in Idomeneo with Welsh National Opera, the title role in La clemenza di Tito with Opera Australia, Fenton in Falstaff with Scottish Opera, the title role in Monteverdi's Orfeo with Netherlands Opera, and Don Ottavio in Don Giovanni at numerous houses and festivals including Covent Garden and the San Francisco Opera and both the Aix-en-Provence and Glyndebourne festivals. Other roles have included Lensky in Eugene Onegin, Lysander in Britten's A Midsummer Night's Dream, David in Carl Nielsen's Saul og David, and Jupiter in Semele, the latter of which he performed to acclaim at the English National Opera in 1999. At the 2003 Salzburg Festival, he created the role of 'Der Daemon' in the world premiere of Hans Werner Henze's L'Upupa und der Triumph der Sohnesliebe, which he later reprised at the Teatro Real in Madrid.

More recently, Ainsley has sung the roles of Soliman in Zaide and Belfiore in La finta giardiniera at the Salzburg Festival (2006), The Madwoman in Britten's Curlew River with Oper Frankfurt (2006), Pelléas in Pelléas et Mélisande with the Deutsche Oper Berlin (2006), Skuratov in Janáček's From the House of the Dead with both the Amsterdam and Vienna Festivals (2007), Hippolyt in the world premiere of Henze's Phaedra with the Berlin State Opera (2007) and La Monnaie (2007), Vere in Billy Budd with Oper Frankfurt (2007), Chevalier de la Force in Dialogues des Carmelites with the Hamburg State Opera (2008), and both Bajazete in Tamerlano and the title role in Idomeneo with the Bavarian State Opera (2008). Ainsley sung the role of Emilio in Partenope with the English National Opera in the autumn of 2008 and returned for performances at the Bavarian State Opera and Berlin State Opera in 2009. In 2010 his performance in the role of Captain Vere in Billy Budd was filmed by the Glyndebourne Festival for release in August 2010, and is streaming on Medici.tv.

== Awards ==
He was awarded the Munich Festival Prize for his performance as Orfeo, and in 2007 won the 2007 Royal Philharmonic Society Singer Award. He was appointed Officer of the Order of the British Empire (OBE) in the 2020 Birthday Honours for services to music.

== Personal life ==
In 2007 Ainsley entered into a civil partnership with organist William Whitehead.

Ainsley was diagnosed with leukaemia in 2016, and took the decision to retire from public performance, although he continues to work in music education.

== Recordings ==
Ainsley has made numerous recordings that range from Monteverdi to Britten. He regularly appears on radio and in the BBC Proms. Amongst other recordings are Rameau's Dardanus, Monteverdi's L'Orfeo (he is generally regarded as the world authority on this character's role), Britten's Serenade for tenor, horn and strings, the role of Frederic in the Sir Charles Mackerras recording of The Pirates of Penzance and lieder by Mozart, Beethoven and Schumann. Ainsley has also become particularly associated with Handel's music and has recorded over ten of his oratorios including Jephtha, La Resurrezione, Messiah, Joshua and Saul. He has also recorded numerous English and French songs including works by Ralph Vaughan Williams, Peter Warlock, Herbert Howells, Gerald Finzi and Gabriel Fauré among others.

== Sources ==
- James Jolly: "John Mark Ainsley", Grove Music Online ed. L. Macy (Accessed 3 October 2008), (subscription access)
- AINSLEY, John Mark International Who's Who. accessed 1 September 2006.
