= Clive =

Clive is a name. People and fictional characters with the name include:

== People ==
=== Given name ===
- Clive Allen (born 1961), English football player
- Clive Anderson (born 1952), British television, radio presenter, comedy writer and former barrister
- Clive Barker (born 1952), English writer, film director and visual artist
- Clive Barker (artist, born 1940), British pop artist
- Clive Barker (soccer) (born 1944), South African coach
- Clive Barnes (1927–2008), English writer and critic, dance and theater critic for The New York Times
- Clive Bell (1881–1964), English art critic
- Clive Brook (1887–1974), British film actor
- Clive Burr (1957–2013), British musician, former drummer with Iron Maiden
- Clive Campbell (footballer), New Zealand footballer in the 1970s and early '80s
- Clive Campbell (born 1955), Jamaican-born DJ with the stage name DJ Kool Herc
- Clive Clark (golfer) (born 1945), English golfer
- Clive Clark (footballer) (1940–2014), English former footballer
- Clive Clerk (1945–2005), Trinidad-born actor, dancer, interior designer and painter
- Clive Clarke (born 1980), Irish footballer
- Clive Coates (born 1941), British wine writer and Master of Wine
- Clive Cussler (1931–2020), American novelist and underwater explorer
- Clive Davis (born 1932), American record producer
- Clive Doucet (born 1946), Canadian writer and politician
- Clive Donner (1926–2010), British film director
- Clive Dunn (1920–2012), English actor
- Clive Evans (footballer) (born 1957), English former footballer
- Clive Evans (fashion designer) (born 1933), London fashion designer of the 1960s, better known as 'Clive'
- Clive Feigenbaum (1939–2007), British businessman
- Clive Finlayson (born 1955), Gibraltarian zoologist, paleoanthropologist and paleontologist
- Clive Foster, Christian pastor and UK's first Windrush Commissioner
- Clive Francis (born 1946), British actor
- Clive Gregson (born 1955), English singer-songwriter, musician and record producer
- Clive Granger (1934–2009), British econometrician
- Clive Hamilton (born 1953), Australian public intellectual
- Clive Hirschhorn (born 1940), South African writer and critic, longtime film and theater critic
- Clive Hollick (born 1945), British businessman
- Clive Hulme (1911–1982), New Zealand recipient of the Victoria Cross
- Clive Irvine (1893–1974), Scottish medical missionary
- Clive James (1939–2019), Australian author, critic, broadcaster, poet, translator and memoirist
- Clive Johnstone (1963–2024), British Royal Navy officer
- Clive Jones (rugby), Welsh rugby union and rugby league footballer of the 1970s
- Clive Lewis (disambiguation)
- Clive Lloyd (born 1944), Guyanese-British cricketer
- Clive Mantle (born 1957), English actor
- Clive Matson (born 1941), American poet and writer
- Clive Matthewson (born 1944), New Zealand civil engineer and former politician
- Clive Myrie (born 1964), British journalist
- Clive Nolan (born 1961), British musician, composer and producer
- Clive Oppenheimer (born 1964), British volcanologist
- Clive Owen (born 1964), English actor
- Clive Palmer (born 1954), Australian businessman and politician
- Clive Palmer (1943–2014), English folk musician and banjoist
- Clive Parker (born 1960), English drummer
- Clive Phillpot (born 1938), British librarian
- Clive Ponting (1946–2020), British civil servant and historian
- Clive Revill (born 1930), New Zealand actor
- Clive Rice (1949–2015), South African international cricketer
- Clive Rowe (born 1964), British actor
- Clive Russell (born 1945), Scottish actor
- Clive Sinclair (1940–2021), British entrepreneur and inventor
- Clive Smith (footballer, born 1923) (1923–1999), Australian rules footballer
- Clive A. Smith (born 1944), British director and animator, co-founder of the Canadian animation studio Nelvana
- Clive Soley, Baron Soley (born 1939), British politician
- Clive A. Stace (born 1938), British botanist
- Clive Stafford Smith (born 1959), British attorney
- Clive Suares, Australian band member
- Clive Thompson (businessman) (born 1943), Deputy Chairman of Strategic Equity Capital
- Clive Thompson (journalist) (born 1968), Canadian freelance journalist, blogger and science and technology writer
- Clive Wearing (born 1938), British former musicologist, conductor, and pianist with severe amnesia
- Clive Williams (rugby union) (born 1948), Welsh rugby union player
- Clive Williams (professor) (born 1945), British-born former Australian Army Military Intelligence officer and academic
- Clive Wilmer (1945–2025), British poet
- Clive Zanda (1939–2022), Trinidad and Tobago extempo and kaisojazz musician

=== Surname ===
- Clive (surname)

== Places ==
- Clive, a village in Shropshire, England
- Clive, a small town in New Zealand
- Clive, a city in Iowa
- Clive River, a small river in New Zealand

== Fictional characters ==
- Clive, in Beyond the Black Stump (comic strip)
- Clive, in "Rose" (Doctor Who episode)
- Clive, a Garfield character
- Clive Babineaux, a character in iZombie
- Clive King, in the British medical drama, Casualty
- Clive Gibbons, in the Australian soap opera Neighbours
- Clive Jones (Doctor Who), in the British TV series Doctor Who
- Clive Vickers, a character in Brotherhood of Mutants
- Clive Yorkin, enemy of the character Flash in DC Comics
- Clive Rosfield, the main protagonist and primary playable character of Final Fantasy XVI

== See also ==
- Statue of Robert Clive, London
