= Clive Barker (disambiguation) =

Clive Barker (born 1952) is a British horror writer, director, and artist.

Clive Barker may also refer to:

- Clive Barker (editor) (1931–2005), theater coach and academic
- Clive Barker (artist, born 1940), British pop artist
- Clive Barker (soccer) (1944–2023), South African soccer player and coach

== See also ==
- Barker (disambiguation)
- Clive (disambiguation)
