= Karamu =

Karamu or Karamū may refer to:

- Karamu, New Zealand, a rural locality in the North Island of New Zealand
- Coprosma robusta, a tree known as karamū
- Coprosma lucida, a shrub sometimes called shining karamū
- Coprosma macrocarpa, a shrub called coastal karamū
- Karamu (feast), a feast held on December 31 as part of the Kwanzaa celebrations
- Karamu House, a theater in Cleveland, Ohio
