= Whakatu, Hawke's Bay =

Settlement in Hawke's Bay Region, New Zealand

Whakatu
- Rural community
- Interactive map of Whakatu
- Coordinates: 39.606°S 176.892°E
- Country: New Zealand
- Region: Hawke's Bay
- Territorial authority: Hastings District
- Ward: Heretaunga General Ward; Takitimu Māori Ward
- Electorates: Tukituki; Ikaroa-Rāwhiti (Māori)

Government
  - Territorial Authority: Hastings District Council
  - Regional council: Hawke's Bay Regional Council
  - Mayor of Hastings: Wendy Schollum
  - Tukituki MP: Catherine Wedd
  - Ikaroa-Rāwhiti MP: Cushla Tangaere-Manuel

Area
  - Total: 2.71 km^{2} (1.05 sq mi)

Population (June 2025)
  - Total: 680
  - Density: 250/km^{2} (650/sq mi)

Whakatu is a rural community in the Hastings District and Hawke's Bay Region of New Zealand's North Island. It is located 8 kilometres (5.0 mi) north-east of the centre of Hastings. A large industrial area is enclosed by a bend in the Clive River, and the closure of the freezing works in Whakatu in 1986 cost the region 2000 full-time and seasonal jobs. State Highway 2 and the Palmerston North–Gisborne Line pass through Whakatu.

Richard Tucker (1856–1922) was a notable resident of Whakatu; he owned the largest wool-scouring plant in the Hawke's Bay Region.

== Demographics ==
Statistics New Zealand describes Whakatū as a rural settlement, which covers 2.71 km^{2} (1.05 sq mi). It had an estimated population of 680 as of June 2025, with a population density of 251 people per km^{2}. It is part of the larger Karamu statistical area.

Historical population
Year	Pop.	±% p.a.
2006	591	—
2013	579	−0.29%
2018	615	+1.21%
2023	645	+0.96%
The 2006 population is for a larger area of 3.73 km^{2}. Source:

Whakatū had a population of 645 in the 2023 New Zealand census, an increase of 30 people (4.9%) since the 2018 census, and an increase of 66 people (11.4%) since the 2013 census. There were 315 males and 327 females in 183 dwellings. 1.9% of people identified as LGBTIQ+. The median age was 35.1 years (compared with 38.1 years nationally). There were 129 people (20.0%) aged under 15 years, 147 (22.8%) aged 15 to 29, 291 (45.1%) aged 30 to 64, and 75 (11.6%) aged 65 or older.

People could identify as more than one ethnicity. The results were 52.6% European (Pākehā); 61.4% Māori; 6.5% Pasifika; 3.7% Asian; 0.5% Middle Eastern, Latin American and African New Zealanders (MELAA); and 4.7% other, which includes people giving their ethnicity as "New Zealander". English was spoken by 97.7%, Māori by 15.8%, Samoan by 0.9%, and other languages by 3.3%. No language could be spoken by 1.9% (e.g. too young to talk). The percentage of people born overseas was 7.9, compared with 28.8% nationally.

Religious affiliations were 29.3% Christian, 0.5% Hindu, 8.8% Māori religious beliefs, and 0.9% New Age. People who answered that they had no religion were 54.9%, and 6.5% of people did not answer the census question.

Of those at least 15 years old, 54 (10.5%) people had a bachelor's or higher degree, 294 (57.0%) had a post-high school certificate or diploma, and 165 (32.0%) people exclusively held high school qualifications. The median income was $41,000, compared with $41,500 nationally. 21 people (4.1%) earned over $100,000 compared to 12.1% nationally. The employment status of those at least 15 was 279 (54.1%) full-time, 72 (14.0%) part-time, and 36 (7.0%) unemployed.

== Climate ==
Climate data for Whakatu (1991–2020)
Month	Jan	Feb	Mar	Apr	May	Jun	Jul	Aug	Sep	Oct	Nov	Dec	Year
Mean daily maximum °C (°F)	23.5 (74.3)	23.4 (74.1)	21.9 (71.4)	19.5 (67.1)	17.3 (63.1)	14.8 (58.6)	13.8 (56.8)	14.7 (58.5)	16.5 (61.7)	18.5 (65.3)	20.0 (68.0)	22.0 (71.6)	18.8 (65.9)
Daily mean °C (°F)	17.9 (64.2)	18.0 (64.4)	16.2 (61.2)	13.8 (56.8)	11.3 (52.3)	9.0 (48.2)	8.4 (47.1)	9.1 (48.4)	11.0 (51.8)	12.7 (54.9)	14.4 (57.9)	16.7 (62.1)	13.2 (55.8)
Mean daily minimum °C (°F)	12.3 (54.1)	12.7 (54.9)	10.6 (51.1)	8.1 (46.6)	5.3 (41.5)	3.1 (37.6)	3.0 (37.4)	3.6 (38.5)	5.4 (41.7)	7.0 (44.6)	8.8 (47.8)	11.4 (52.5)	7.6 (45.7)
Average rainfall mm (inches)	45.9 (1.81)	48.2 (1.90)	54.0 (2.13)	79.1 (3.11)	56.8 (2.24)	76.8 (3.02)	98.6 (3.88)	56.9 (2.24)	50.2 (1.98)	54.3 (2.14)	45.3 (1.78)	49.9 (1.96)	716 (28.19)
Source: NIWA

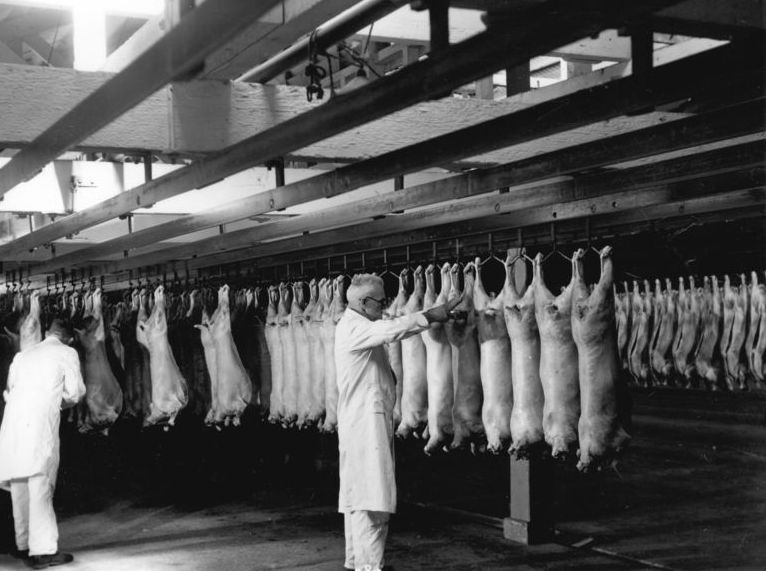
Frozen Mutton, Hawke's Bay, January 1947

== Freezing works ==
Hawkes Bay Steam Boiling Down Company at Whakatu was established in January 1867. In 1912, a Waipukurau farmers meeting formed a cooperative freezing company and in 1913 land was bought at Whakatu, A.S Mitchell, Wellington. designed the works and Bull Brothers, Napier built it, with housing and a railway siding for about £70,000. Hawke’s Bay Farmers' Freezing Works opened on 6 January 1915, 123,900 sheep and 3,190 cattle being slaughtered in the first season. Following the 1984 end of agricultural subsidies under Rogernomics, Wattie’s and others bought Hawke’s Bay Farmers Meat Company shares and on 10 October 1986 Whakatu was closed with the loss of 2,000 jobs. Part of the works was demolished in 2004.

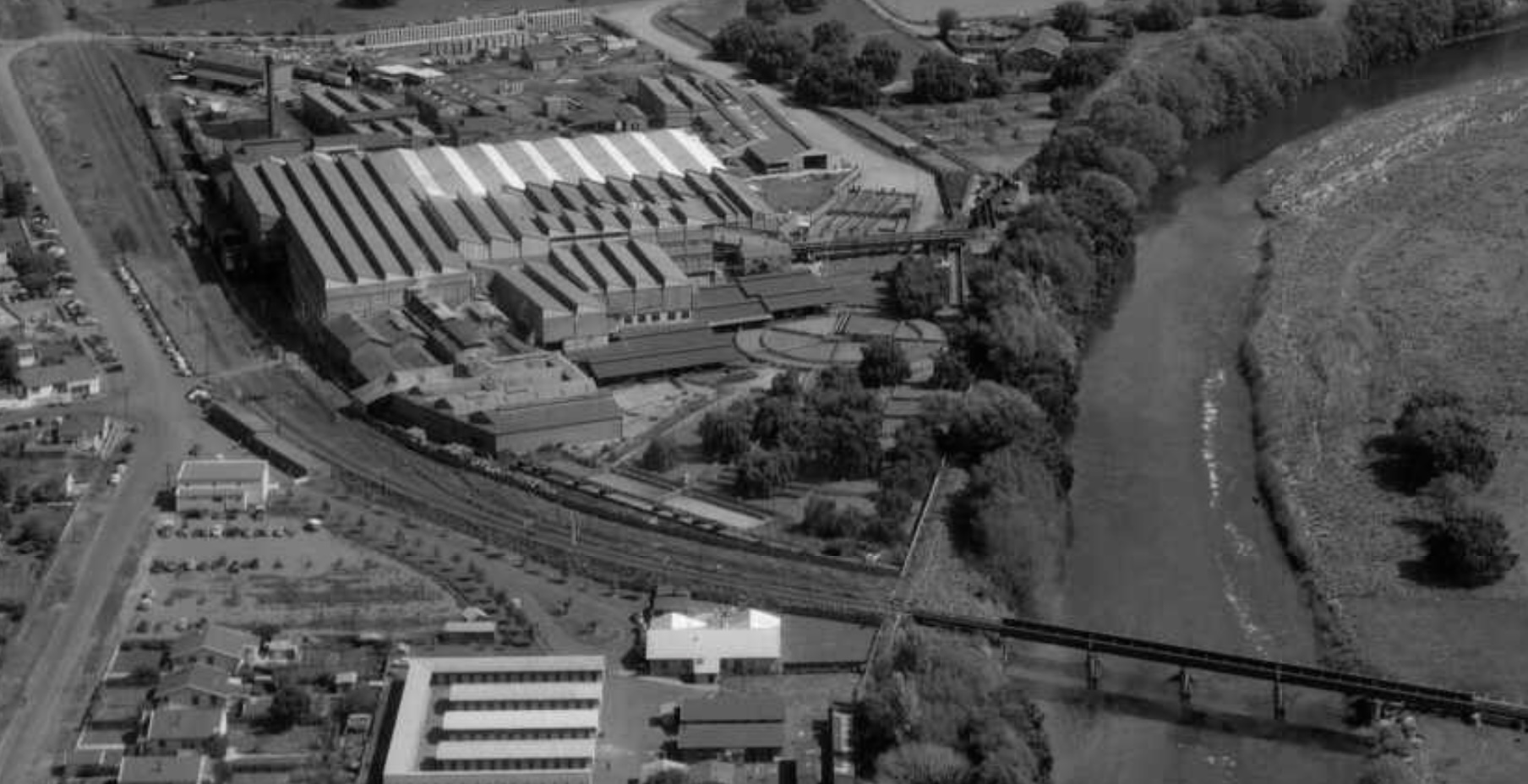
Whakatu in 1956. There was a platform just to the left of the works. Bridge 214 is on the right

== Railway station ==
The railway through Whakatu opened on 12 October 1874, being in the first 18.8 km (11.7 mi) section of the Palmerston North–Gisborne Line, from Napier to Hastings. However, it wasn't until July 1881 that a flag station at Boiling Down Works was proposed. A newspaper report complained about the lack of through tickets to Whakatu in February 1882. By 1896 there was a shelter shed (damaged by fire in 1911), platform, loading bank and a passing loop for 18 wagons, extended to 24 in about 1898. On 30 July 1912 it became a tablet station. A private siding for Hawkes Bay Farmers Meat Co Ltd was in place by 16 September 1914. On 14 March 1922 a notice was issued to the porter at Whakatu – "In future the Meat Company's horse shunter at your station is not on any account to be permitted to work in the yard whilst shunting with train engine is being carried out." Whakatu closed to all traffic on 18 May 1982, though wagon loads were accepted until 22 September 1986. A passing loop remains at the former station site.

Just north of Whakatu, the line crosses Te Awa o Mokotūāraro (Clive River) on bridge 214, which was rebuilt in 1936 by Christiani & Neilsen, Wellington. It is 450 ft (140 m) long, with 5 x 60 ft (18 m) and 5 x 30 ft (9.1 m) steel trusses on reinforced concrete piers.

	Former adjoining stations	
Tōmoana; Line open, station closed 2.99 km (1.86 mi) towards PN	Palmerston North–Gisborne Line	Clive; Line open, station closed 4.68 km (2.91 mi) towards Gisborne
