= Worcester Cathedral =

Church of England cathedral in Worcestershire, England

Coordinates: 52°11′20″N 2°13′15″W

- Cathedral Church of Christ and Blessed Mary the Virgin
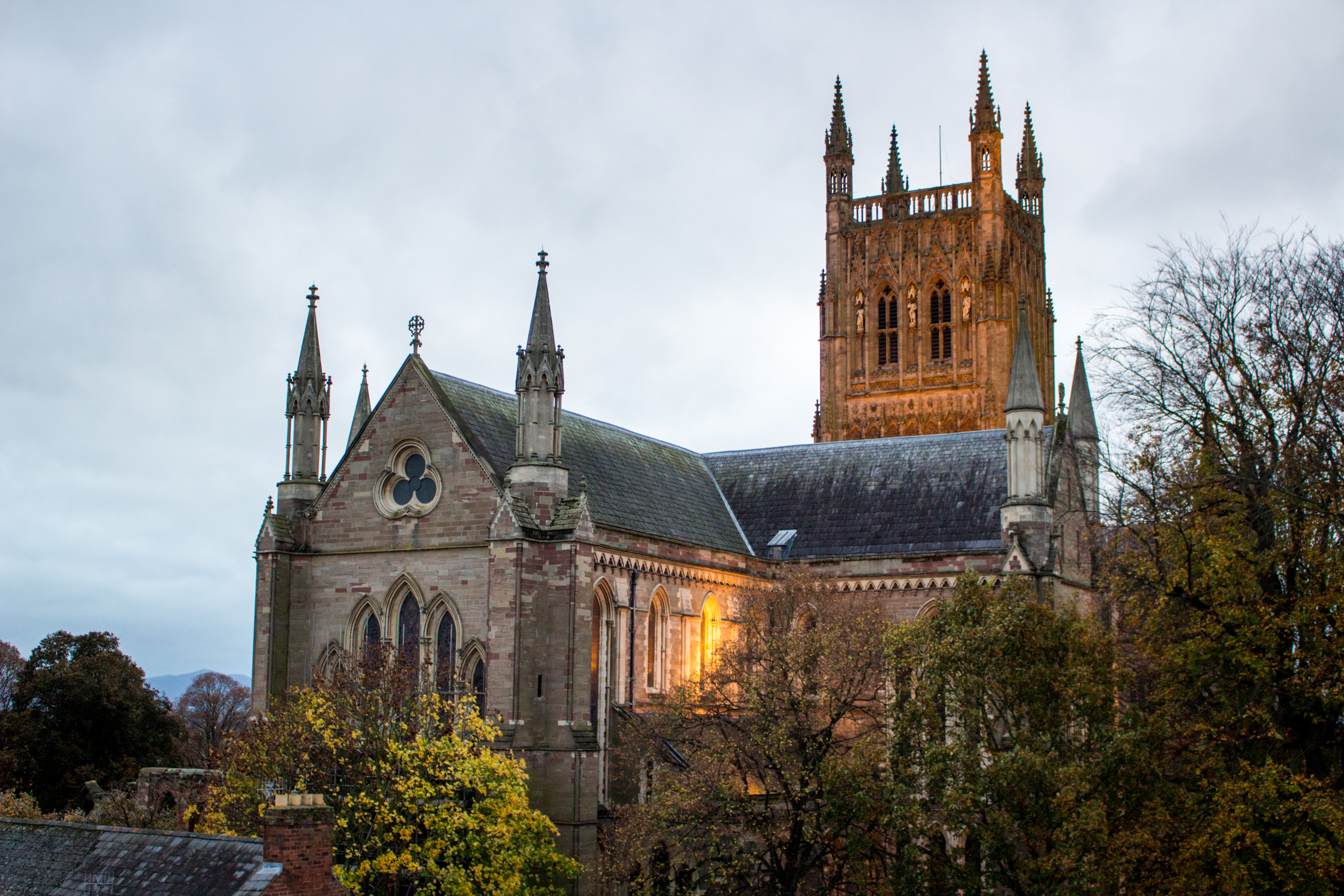
- Worcester Cathedral

- Location within Worcestershire
- OS grid reference: SO 85002 54520
- Location: Worcester (Worcestershire)
- Country: England
- Denomination: Church of England
- Previous denomination: Roman Catholic
- Website: worcestercathedral.co.uk

History
- Former name: Worcester Priory

Architecture
- Functional status: Active
- Style: Norman, Gothic
- Years built: 1084–1504

Specifications
- Length: 130 m (426.51 ft)
- Width: 44 m (144.36 ft)

Administration
- Province: Canterbury
- Diocese: Worcester

Clergy
- Bishop: Hugh Nelson
- Dean: Stephen Edwards

Arms of Worcester Cathedral

Flag of Worcester Cathedral, consisting of the cathedral's arms in the canton of a Saint George's Cross, usually flown from the cathedral tower

Worcester Cathedral, formally the Cathedral Church of Christ and Blessed Mary the Virgin, is a Church of England cathedral in Worcester, England. The cathedral is the seat of the bishop of Worcester and is the mother church of the diocese of Worcester; it is administered by its dean and chapter. The cathedral is a grade I listed building and part of a scheduled monument.

The cathedral was founded in 680. The earliest surviving fabric dates from 1084, when the cathedral was rebuilt in the Romanesque style by Bishop (later Saint) Wulfstan. The chapter house dates from 1120, and the nave was extended in the 1170s. It became a place of pilgrimage with the shrines of St Wulfstan and St Oswald. Between 1224 and 1269 the east end was rebuilt in the Early English Gothic style. The remainder of the nave was rebuilt in the 1360s, and the "exquisite" central tower completed in 1374. The cathedral retains a set of medieval misericords, now set into Victorian choir stalls; the cathedral was heavily restored in the nineteenth century, and contains a set of furnishings by George Gilbert Scott. It contains several funerary monuments, including those of King John; Arthur, Prince of Wales, elder brother of Henry VIII; and the prime minister Stanley Baldwin.

== History ==
=== Early history ===
The cathedral was founded in 680, with a Northumbrian priest, Tatwine, appointed as its first bishop. Tatwine died before he could be consecrated, however, so his successor Bishop Bosel may be regarded as Worcester's first serving bishop. The first cathedral church, dedicated to Saints Peter and Paul, was built in this period, but no remains of its architecture survive. The crypt of the present-day cathedral dates from the 11th century and the time of Wulfstan, Bishop of Worcester.

The community associated with the cathedral in the early eighth century included members of various clerical orders. The cathedral community was regulated along formal monastic lines as a consequence of the Benedictine reforms in the second half of the tenth century (one author gives the time range 974–977; another considers 969 more likely). There is an important connection with Fleury Abbey in France, as Oswald, bishop of Worcester from 961 to 992, was professed at Fleury and introduced the monastic rule of Fleury to the monastery that he established at Worcester around the year 966, which was dedicated – as the present cathedral church is – to St. Mary.

=== Medieval ===
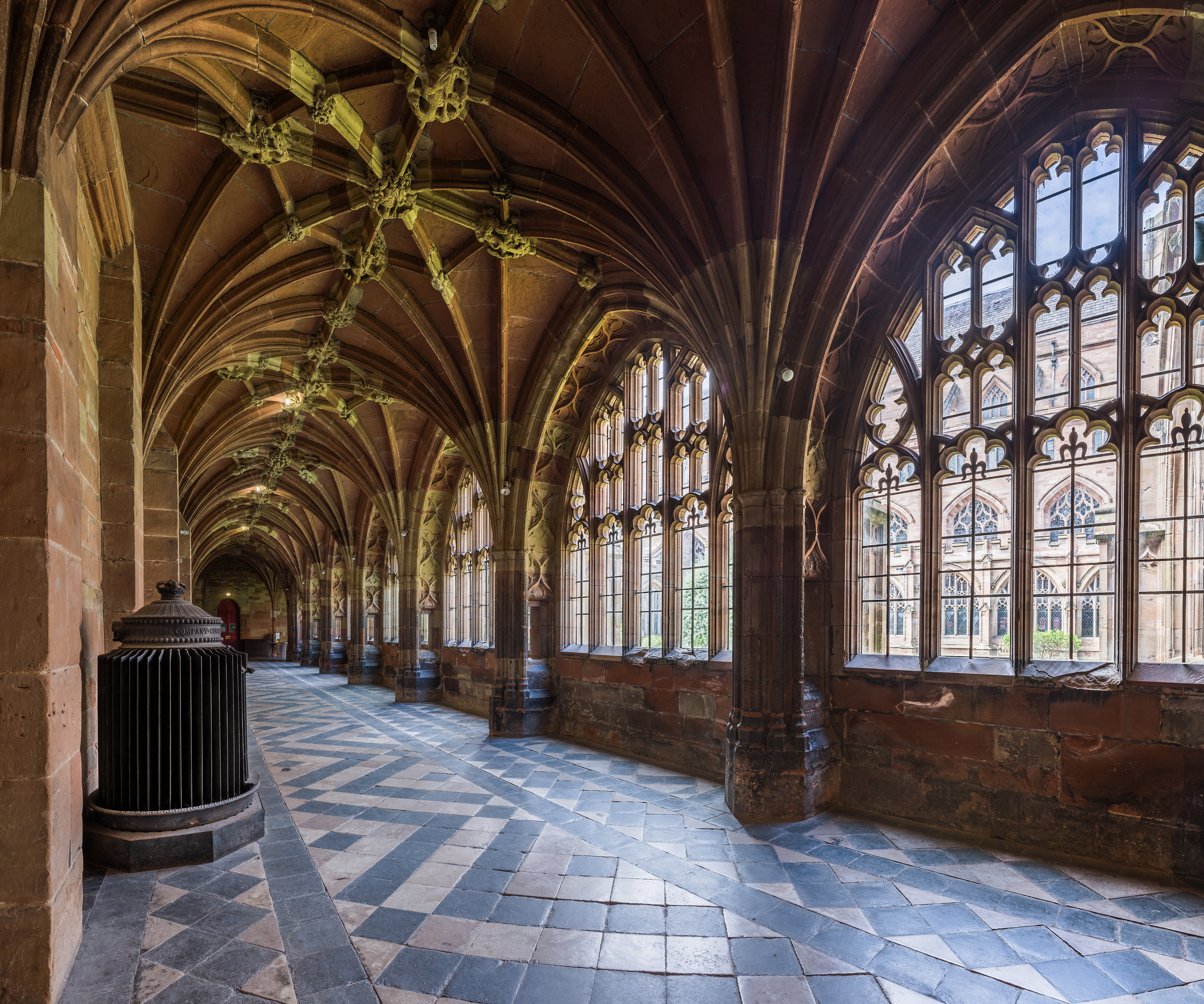
The medieval cloisters

Wulfstan, bishop of Worcester, was the last surviving Anglo-Saxon bishop, living until 1095. He was later made a saint. The cathedral is the burial place of King John, who died in 1216.

The cathedral priory, one of a number of religious institutions in the city, was a major landowner and economic force, in both Worcester and the county. Its properties included the priory manor of Bromsgrove. It was a centre of learning and schooling, and was associated with hospitals. The Church received a portion of local taxations, and administered ecclesiastical law as applied to Christian morals, which could result in punishments. It had close political associations with leading gentry and aristocracy. It thus had a central role in the medieval life of the city and county.

==== Relations with the Jewish community of Worcester ====
The Diocese was notably hostile to the small Jewish community in Worcester. Peter of Blois was commissioned by a Bishop of Worcester, probably John of Coutances, to write a significant anti-Judaic treatise Against the Perfidy of Jews around 1190. William de Blois, as Bishop of Worcester, imposed particularly strict rules on Jews within the diocese in 1219. As elsewhere in England, Jews were officially compelled to wear rectangular white badges, supposedly representing tabulae. In most places, this requirement was waived as long as fines were paid. In addition to enforcing the church laws on wearing badges, Blois tried to impose additional restrictions on usury, and wrote to Pope Gregory IX in 1229 to ask for better enforcement and further, harsher measures. In response, the Papacy demanded that Christians be prevented from working in Jewish homes, "lest temporal profit be preferred to the zeal of Christ", and insisted on enforcement of the wearing of badges.

=== Dissolution and Reformation ===
The priory came to an end with King Henry VIII's Dissolution of the Monasteries. Shortly beforehand, in 1535, the prior William More resigned, and was replaced by Henry Holbeach. More had a reputation for fine living, although his standards seem in line with other senior ecclesiastics of the time. However, there certainly were problems with the administration of the priory, including divisions within the community.

The Protestant Hugh Latimer was bishop from 1535, and preached for reform and iconoclasm. He resigned as bishop in 1539, as a result of a theological turn by Henry VIII towards Roman Catholicism, in the Six Articles. John Bell, a moderate reformer, was bishop from 1539 to 1543, during the period of the priory's dissolution.

In the early 16th century, Worcester had around 40 monks. This declined slightly in the years immediately before 1540, as recruitment seems to have halted. There were 35 Benedictine monks plus the Prior Holbeach at the time of dissolution, probably 16 January 1540; eleven were immediately given pensions, while the remainder became secular canons in the new Royal College. Holbeach was re-appointed as the first Dean. A further five former monks were pensioned from the college in July 1540.

The former monastic library of Worcester contained a considerable number of manuscripts which are now scattered over, among other libraries, Cambridge, London (British Library), Oxford (Bodleian), and the Cathedral library at Worcester of today. Remains of the priory dating from the 12th and 13th centuries can still be seen.

John Bell's successor as bishop, Nicholas Heath, was religiously much more conservative and Catholic.

=== Civil War ===
During the Civil War, the cathedral was used to store arms, possibly as early as September 1642. Worcester declared itself for the Crown and was quickly occupied by extra Royalist forces, who were using the building to store munitions when the Earl of Essex briefly retook the city after a skirmish on its outskirts. The Parliamentary troops then ransacked the Cathedral building. Stained glass was smashed and the organ destroyed, along with library books and monuments.

The See was abolished during the Commonwealth and the Protectorate, approximately 1646–1660. The bell tower was demolished in 1647 and the building used as a prison in the aftermath of the 1651 battle.

=== Victorian to present ===
In the 1860s, the cathedral was subject to major restoration work planned by Sir George Gilbert Scott and A. E. Perkins.

An image of the cathedral's west facade appeared on the reverse of the Series E British £20 note commemorating the composer Sir Edward Elgar, whose musical studies began in the cathedral's music library in the late 19th century. It was issued between 1999 and 2007, remaining in circulation as legal tender until 30 June 2010.

== Architecture ==
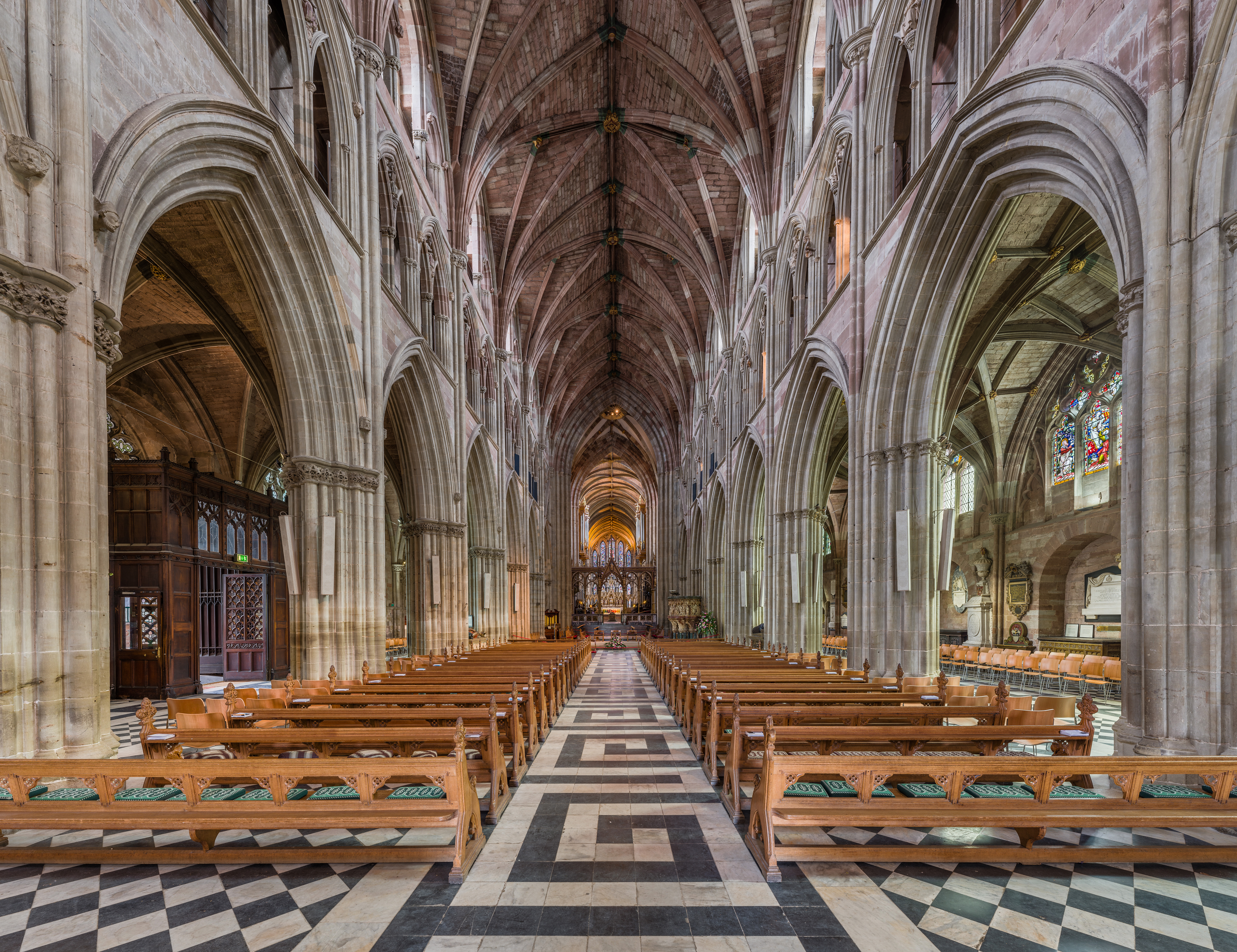
The nave

Worcester Cathedral embodies many features that are highly typical of an English medieval cathedral. Like the cathedrals of Salisbury and Lincoln, it has two transepts crossing the nave, rather than the single transept usual on the Continent. This feature of English cathedrals was to facilitate the private saying of the Holy Office by many clergy or monks. Worcester is also typical of English cathedrals in having a chapter house and cloister. To the north side of the cathedral is an entrance porch, a feature designed to eliminate the draught which, prior to the installation of modern swing doors, would blow through cathedrals whenever the western doors were open.

There are important parts of the building dating from every century from the 11th to the 16th. Its tower in the perpendicular style is described by Alec Clifton-Taylor as "exquisite" and is seen best across the River Severn.

The earliest part of the building at Worcester is the multi-columned crypt in Norman style with cushion capitals remaining from the original monastic church begun by bishop Saint Wulfstan of Worcester in 1084. Also from the Norman period is the circular chapter house of 1120, made octagonal on the outside when the walls were reinforced in the 14th century. The nave was built and rebuilt piecemeal and in different styles by several different architects over a period of 200 years, from 1170 to 1374, some bays being a unique and decorative transition between Norman and Gothic. The oldest parts show alternate layers of green sandstone from Highley in Shropshire and yellow Cotswold limestone.

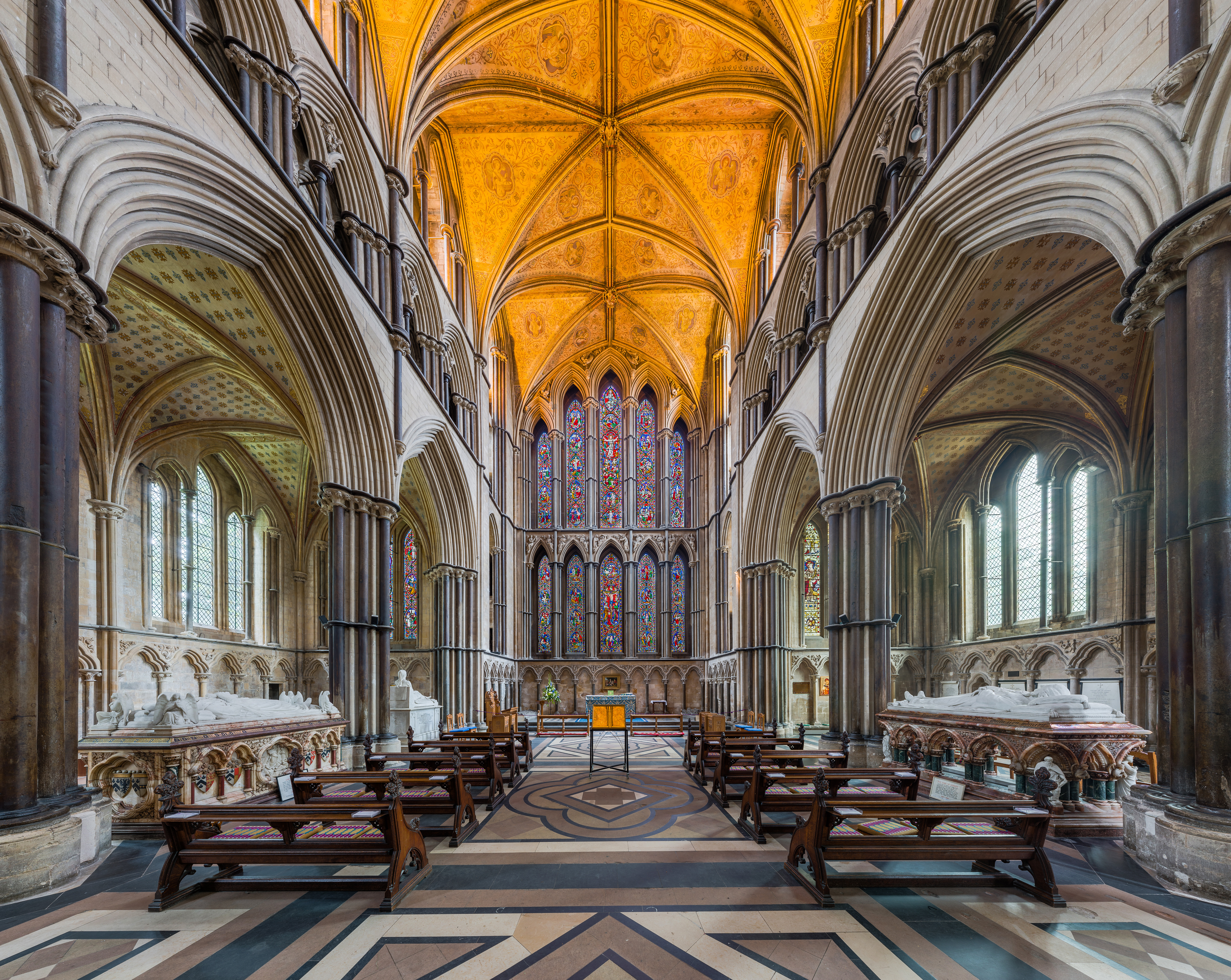
The lady chapel and east window

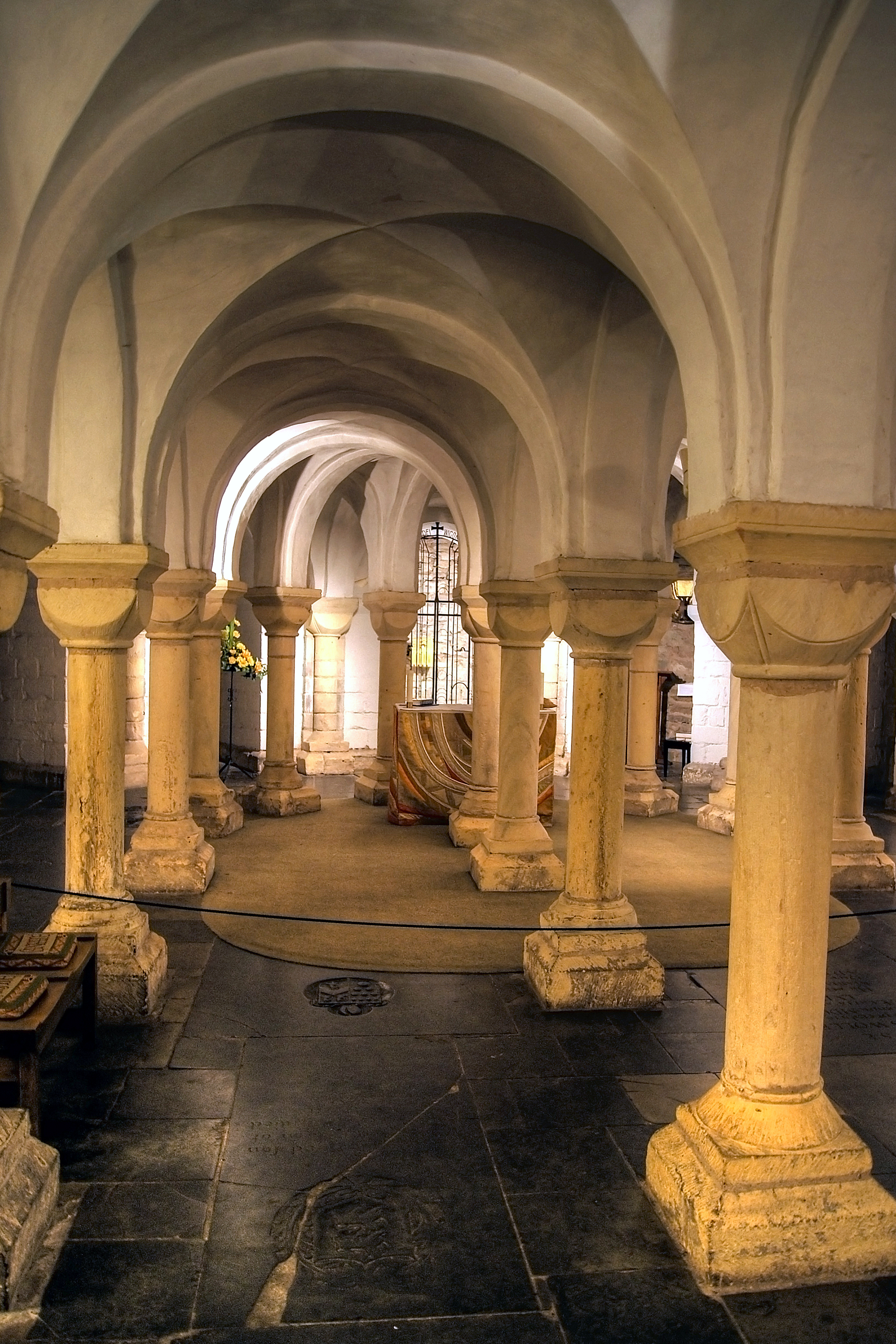
The Norman crypt

The east end was rebuilt over the Norman crypt by Alexander Mason between 1224 and 1269, coinciding with, and in a very similar Early English style to, Salisbury Cathedral. From 1360, John Clyve finished off the nave, built its vault, the west front, the north porch and the eastern range of the cloister. He also strengthened the Norman chapter house, added buttresses and changed its vault. His masterpiece is the central tower of 1374, originally supporting a timber, lead-covered spire, now gone. Between 1404 and 1432, an unknown architect added the north and south ranges to the cloister, which was eventually closed by the western range by John Chapman, 1435–1438. The last important addition is Prince Arthur’s Chantry Chapel to the right of the south choir aisle, 1502–1504.

Worcester Cathedral was extensively restored from 1857 to 1874 by W. A. Perkins and Sir George Gilbert Scott. Most of the fittings and the stained glass date from this time. Some early 17th century screens and panelling, removed from the choir and organ casing in 1864, are now at Holy Trinity Church, Sutton Coldfield.

== Dean and chapter ==
- Dean – Stephen Edwards (installed September 2024)
- Residentiary Canon (Precentor) – vacant
- Residentiary Canon (Librarian & Chaplain to St Oswald's) – Kimberly Bohan (installed January 2023)
- Senior Non-executive Canon – Prof Lynn Nichol
- Non-executive Canon – Anne Penn
- Non-executive Canon – Henry Briggs
- Non-executive Canon – Staffan Engström

== Burials and memorials ==
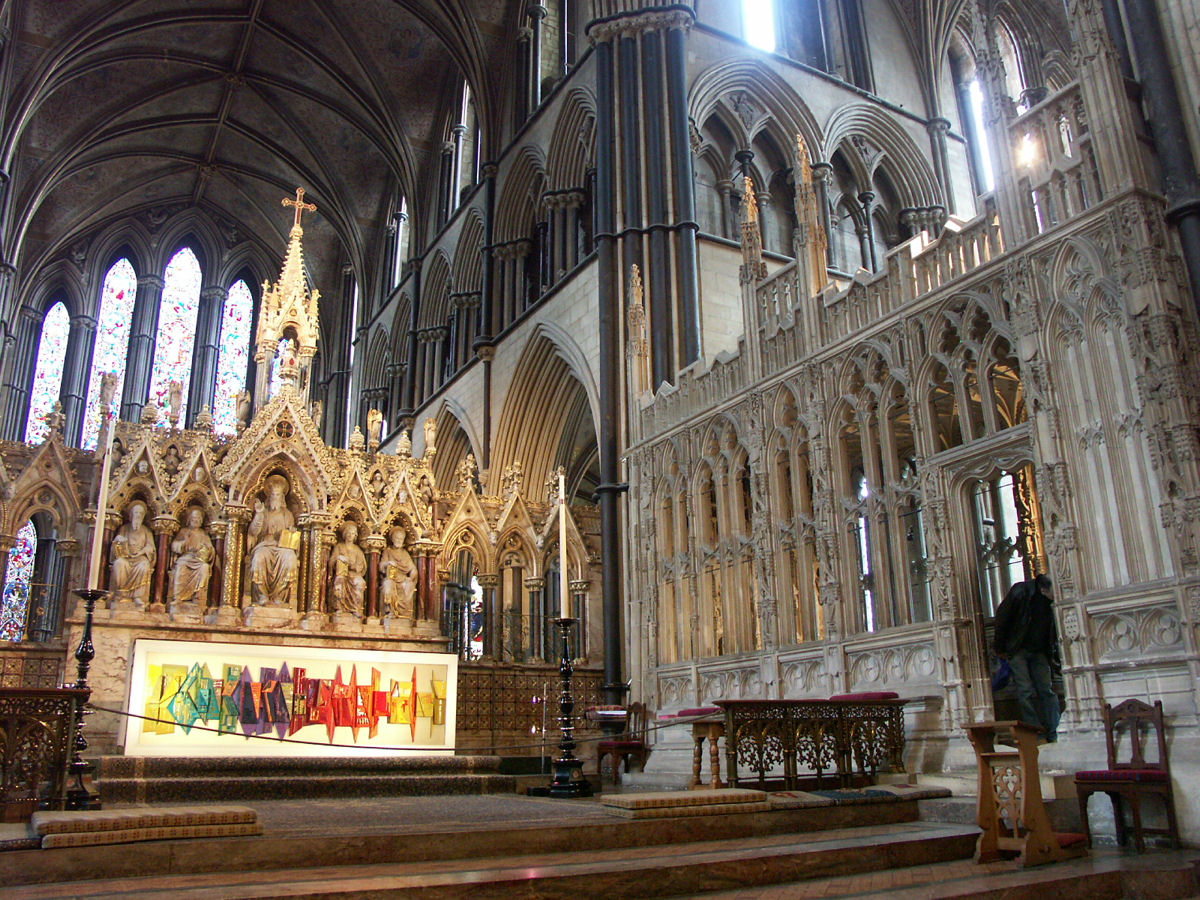
The interior, looking east

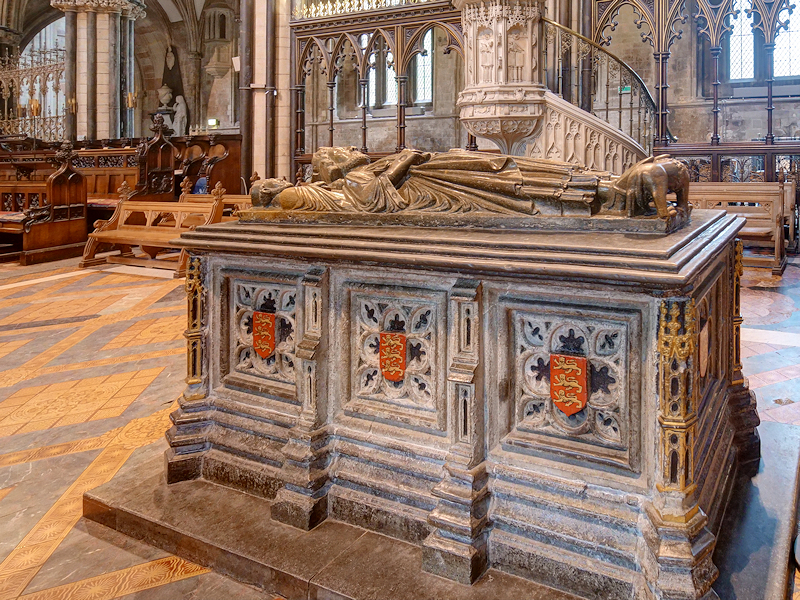
Tomb of King John

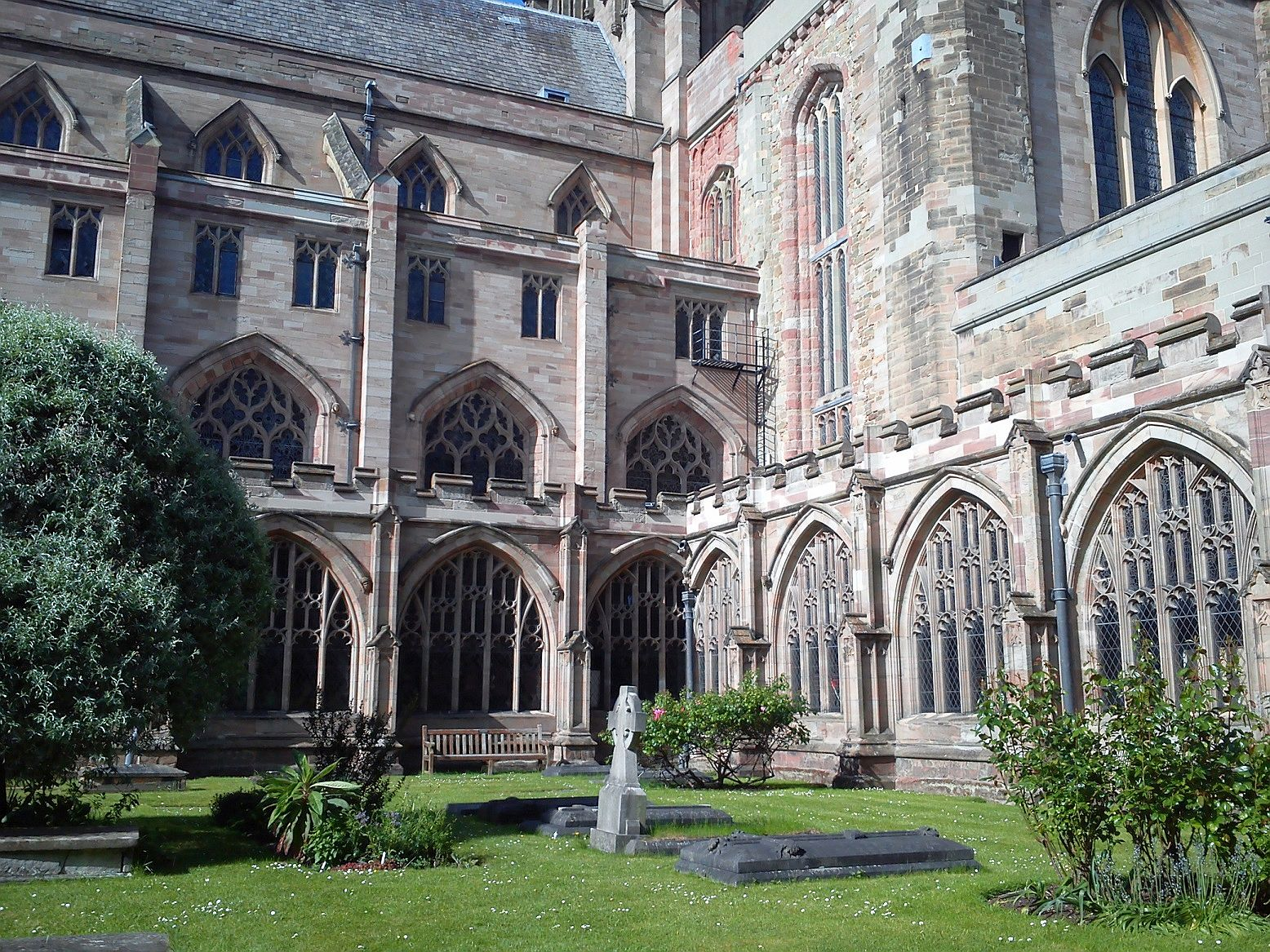
The Cloister gardens

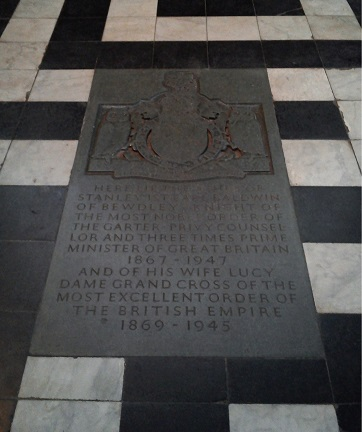
Grave of Stanley Baldwin and his wife Lucy

The Cathedral contains the tomb of King John in its chancel. Before his death in Newark in 1216, John had requested to be buried at Worcester. He is buried between the shrines of St Wulfstan and St Oswald (now destroyed).

The cathedral has a memorial, Prince Arthur's Chantry, to the young prince Arthur Tudor, who is buried here. Arthur's younger brother and next in line for the throne was Henry VIII. Worcester Cathedral suffered badly from iconoclasm but was spared total destruction by Henry VIII during the English Reformation because of his brother's chantry in the cathedral.

An epitaph in Latin to Henry Bright, headmaster of the King's School, Worcester, can be found near the north porch. Other notable burials include:

- Godfrey Giffard (c. 1235 – 1302), Chancellor of the Exchequer of England, Lord Chancellor of England, and Bishop of Worcester
- Ivor Atkins (1869–1953), choirmaster and organist at Worcester Cathedral from 1897 to 1950
- Stanley Baldwin (1867—1947), Prime Minister of the United Kingdom three times, and his wife Lucy (1869-1945)
- Alfred Barry (1826–1910), one time Bishop of Sydney and Primate of Australia
- Richard Edes (d. 1604), a chaplain to Elizabeth I and James I
- John Gauden (1605–1662), Bishop of Worcester, possible author of the Eikon Basilike
- Philip Goodrich (1929–2001), Bishop of Worcester from 1982 to 1996
- William Hamilton, 2nd Duke of Hamilton (1616–1651), Scottish Royalist commander
- Sir Thomas Lyttelton, 1st Baronet (1593–1650)
- William Henry Reed (1876–1942), violinist, friend and biographer of Edward Elgar
- Robin Woods (1914–1997), Dean of Windsor, Bishop of Worcester from 1971 to 1982
- Francis Brett Young (1884–1954), Worcestershire author

== Library ==
The Cathedral Library at Worcester, located since the 19th century in the loft above the South Nave, contains 289 medieval manuscripts, 55 incunabula, and 6600 post-medieval printed books. The library and archive of Worcester Cathedral also has a total of 19000 archived documents, along with a music collection containing works from famous composers such as Edward Elgar and Thomas Tomkins. Of particular note are the Worcester Antiphoner (the only book of its kind to survive the Reformation), the will of King John, and a 1225 copy of Magna Carta. The large scriptorium at Worcester produced many manuscripts and was a place of work for many famous scribes, such as the chronicler John of Worcester and the unnamed monk identified by his distinctive handwriting as The Tremulous Hand of Worcester.

== Misericords ==
Thirty-nine of the misericords date from 1379 and include a complete set of the Labours of the Months. The subject matter includes biblical stories, mythology and folklore including N-07, The Clever Daughter, which shows a naked woman draped in a net, riding a goat and carrying a rabbit under her arm. Three of the misericords are Victorian replacements such as N-02, Judas in the jaws of Satan.

== Bells ==
The tower has a ring of twelve bells plus four semitone bells and a 4.1 tonne non-swinging bourdon. The current peal of 15 ringing bells were cast in 1928 by John Taylor & Co., of Loughborough, from the metal of the original ring cast in 1869. The bourdon bell was cast in 1869 and retuned in 1928. It is only used by the clock to strike the hours and sometimes tolls for special events. The ring is the sixth heaviest ring of twelve in the world; only the bells in the cathedrals of Liverpool, Exeter, York, and St Paul's in London, and of St Mary Redcliffe church in Bristol are heavier. The bells are also considered to be one of the finest toned rings ever cast, a close contender to York Minster. The bells hang in a wooden frame that was constructed in 1869 for the previous ring. Worcester Cathedral is unique in having a purpose-built teaching centre equipped with eight special training bells, linked to computers. The Cathedral is also famous for being the only church in the world to have a ring of ten bells in a harmonic minor key.

== Clock ==
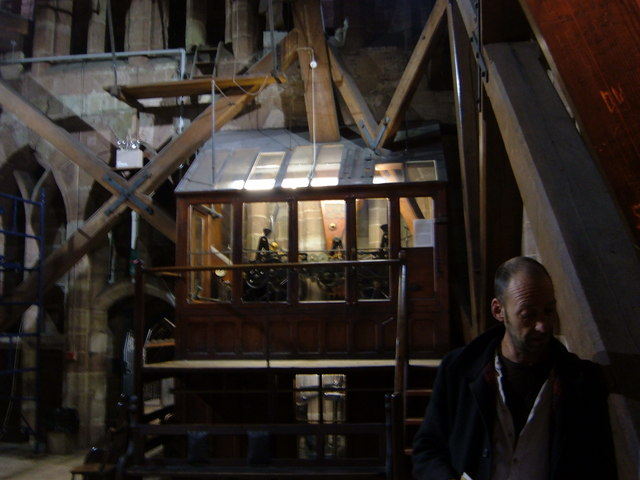
The clock mechanism

A new clock by J. B. Joyce & Co was installed in 1871 at a cost of about £500 (equivalent to £51,500 in 2025). It was built to the designs of Edmund Beckett, 1st Baron Grimthorpe using the double three-legged gravity escapement.

== Music ==
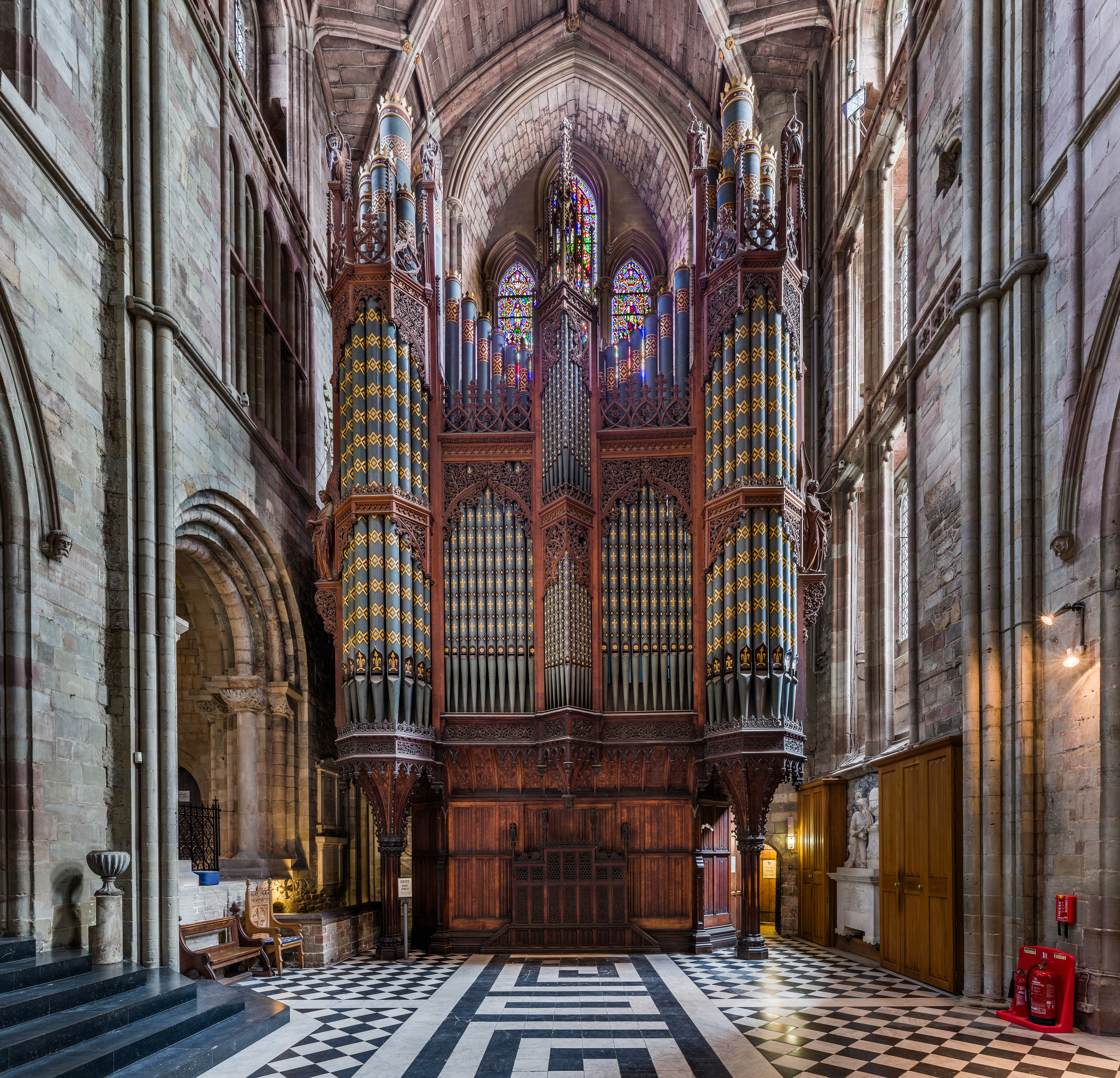
The transept organ-case

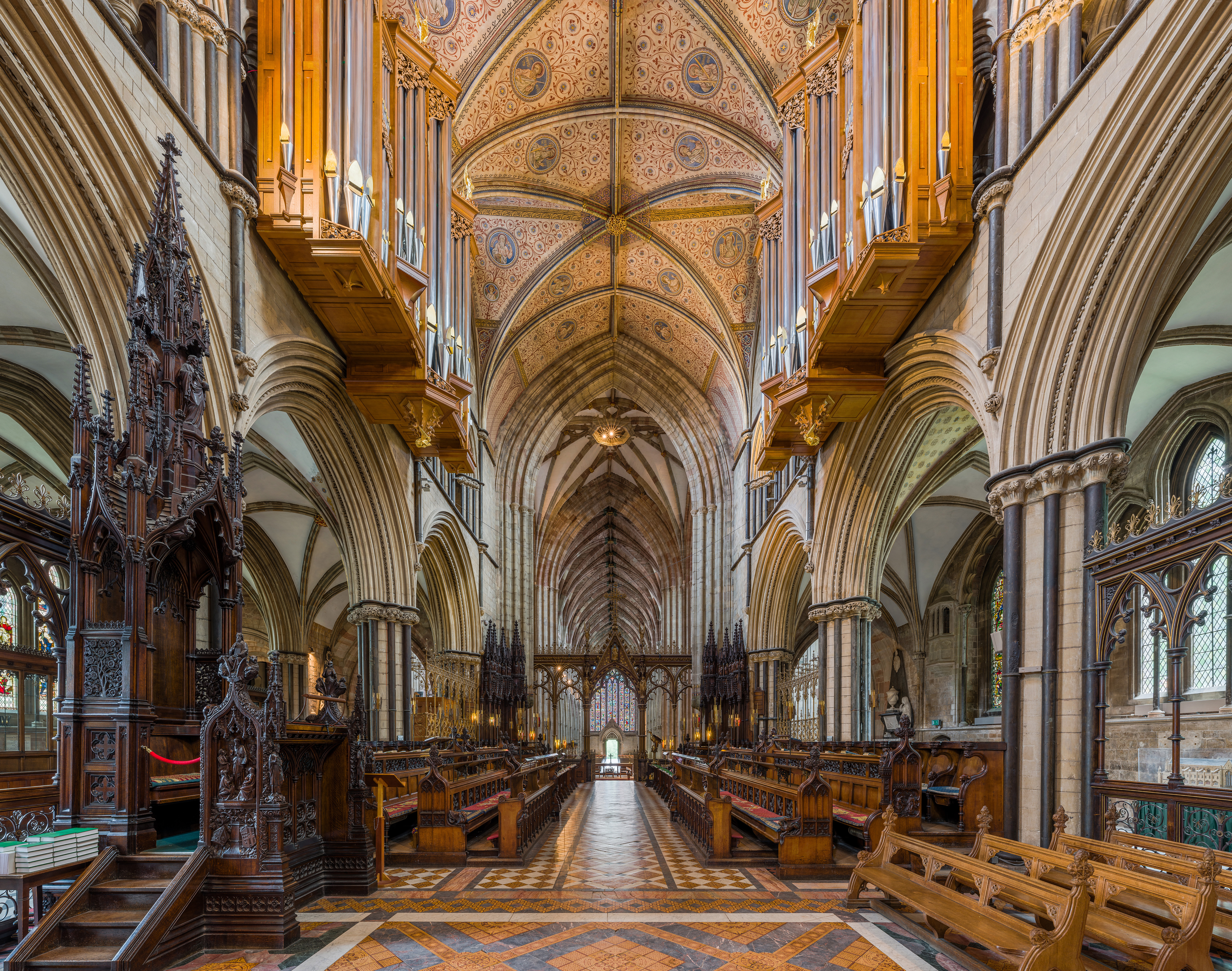
The choir

Worcester Cathedral has three choirs: Worcester Cathedral Choir (the principal choir which has both boys' and girls' sections, normally working independently), Worcester Cathedral Voluntary Choir, and Worcester Cathedral Chamber Choir. All three were involved in the BBC broadcast of the midnight and Christmas morning services in 2007, with the boys and the girls of the Cathedral Choir, respectively, taking the lead in the two services. Since the 18th century, Worcester Cathedral Choir has taken part in the Three Choirs Festival, the oldest music festival in the world.

The composer Edward Elgar spent most of his life in Worcestershire. The first performance of the revised version of his Enigma Variations – the version usually performed – took place at the cathedral during the 1899 Three Choirs Festival. He is commemorated in a stained glass window which contains his portrait.

Worcester Cathedral has a long history of organs dating back to at least 1417. There have been many re-builds and new organs in the intervening period, including work by Thomas Dallam, William Hill and most famously Robert Hope-Jones in 1896. The Hope-Jones organ was heavily re-built in 1925 by Harrison & Harrison, and then regular minor works kept it in working order until Wood Wordsworth and Co. were called in 1978. It was a large four-manual organ with 61 speaking stops. It had a large Gothic Revival case with heavily decorated front pipes as well as two smaller cases either side of the quire.

This organ (apart from the large transept case and pedal pipes) was removed in 2006 in order to make way for a new instrument by Kenneth Tickell, which was completed in the summer of 2008. The nave has a separate three-manual Rodgers organ.

Notable organists at Worcester have included Thomas Tomkins (from 1596), Hugh Blair (from 1895), Ivor Atkins (from 1897) and David Willcocks (from 1950). From 2012 to 2018, the Director of Music and Organist was Peter Nardone.

== Events ==
Worcester Cathedral hosts the annual graduation ceremonies for the University of Worcester. These ceremonies are presided over by the vice-chancellor of the university, and take place over four days in November.

Since 2018, Worcester Cathedral became the host to the annual honours celebration of the Royal Life Saving Society UK, celebrating the long service and meritorious achievements of their lifesaving members.

== Gallery ==
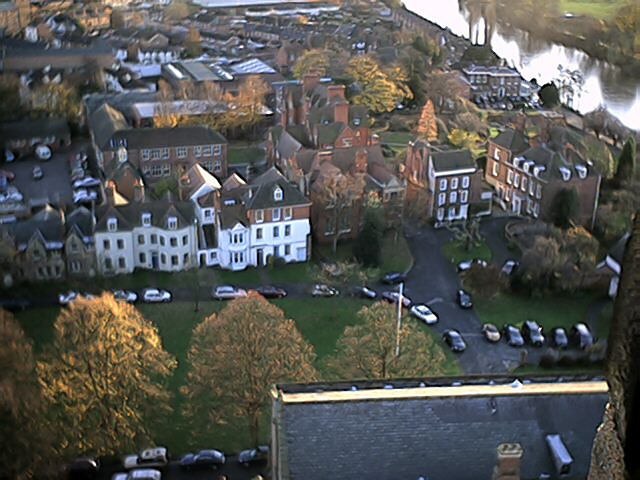
College Green

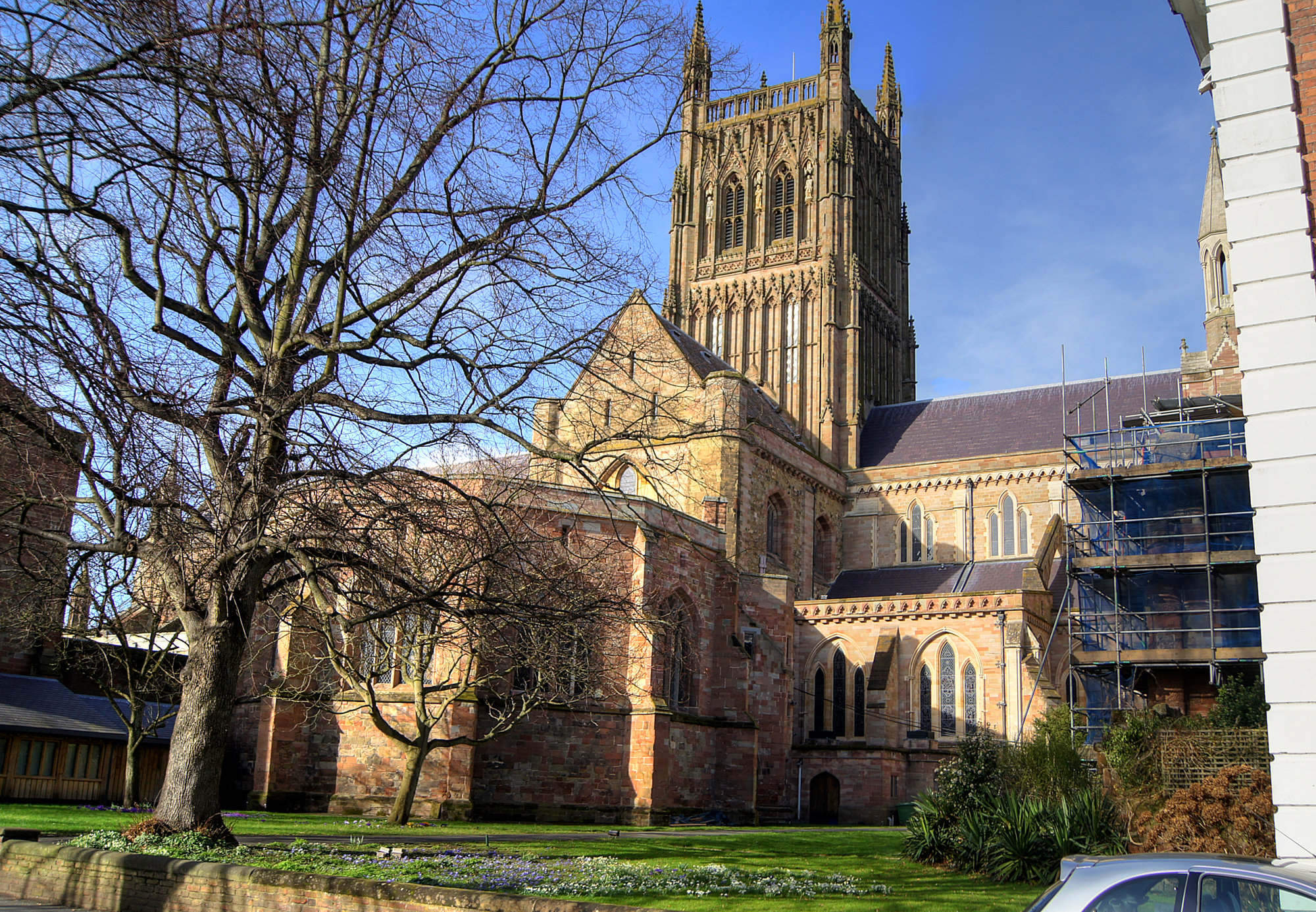
View of the cathedral from College Green

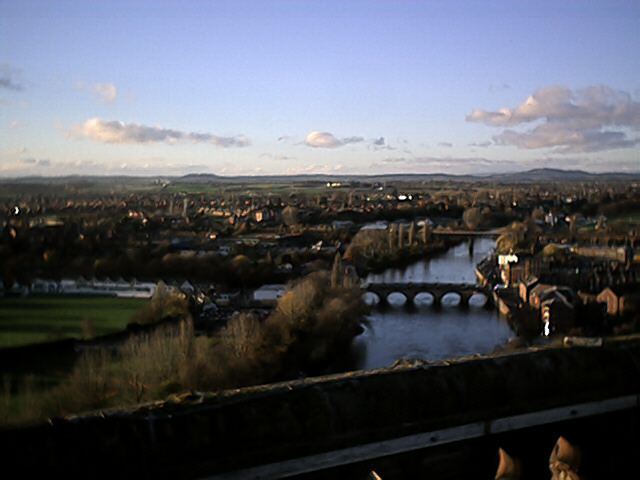
Worcester and the River Severn

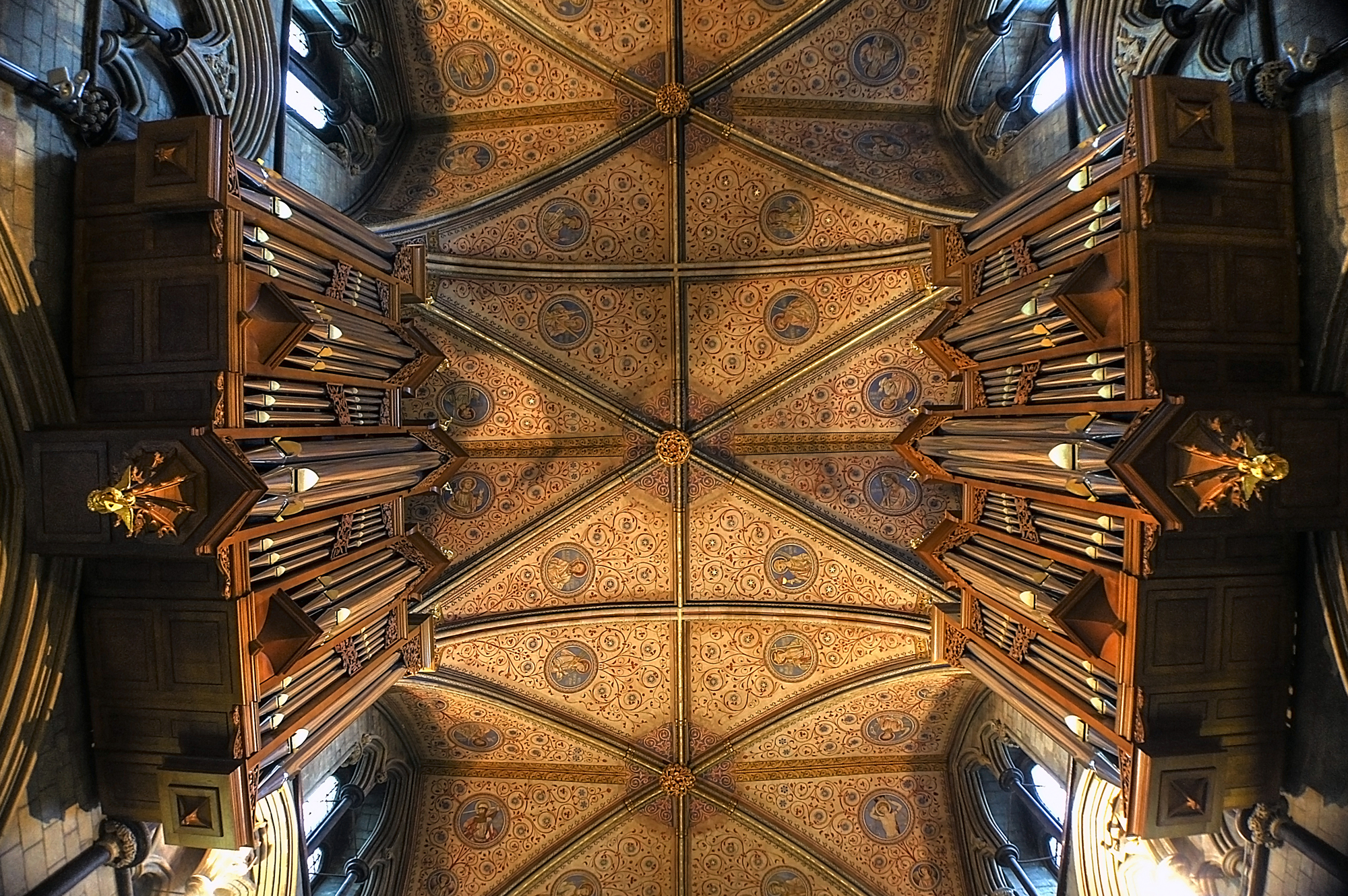
Quire organ cases and decorative ceiling

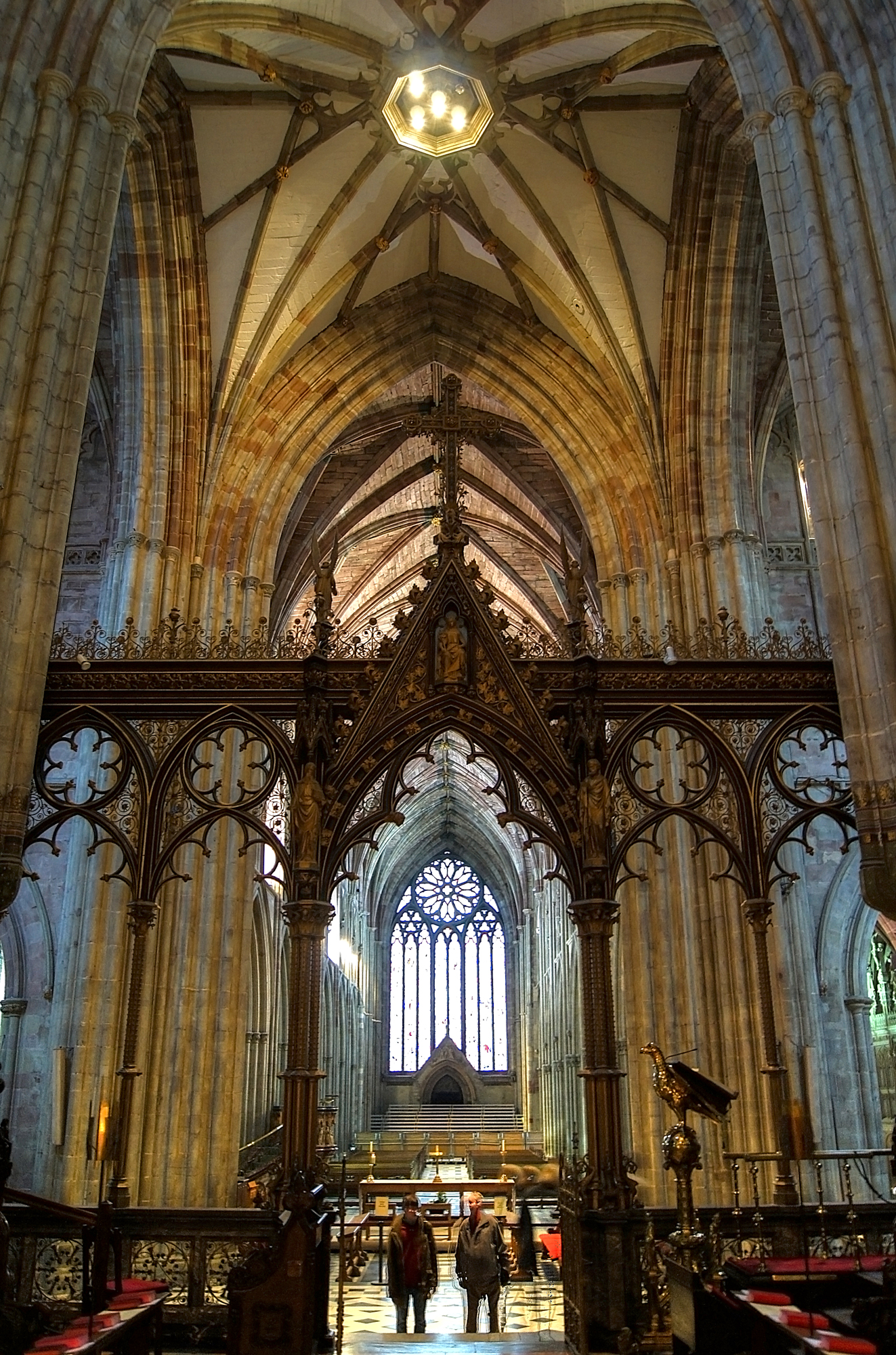
The rood screen, nave and west window

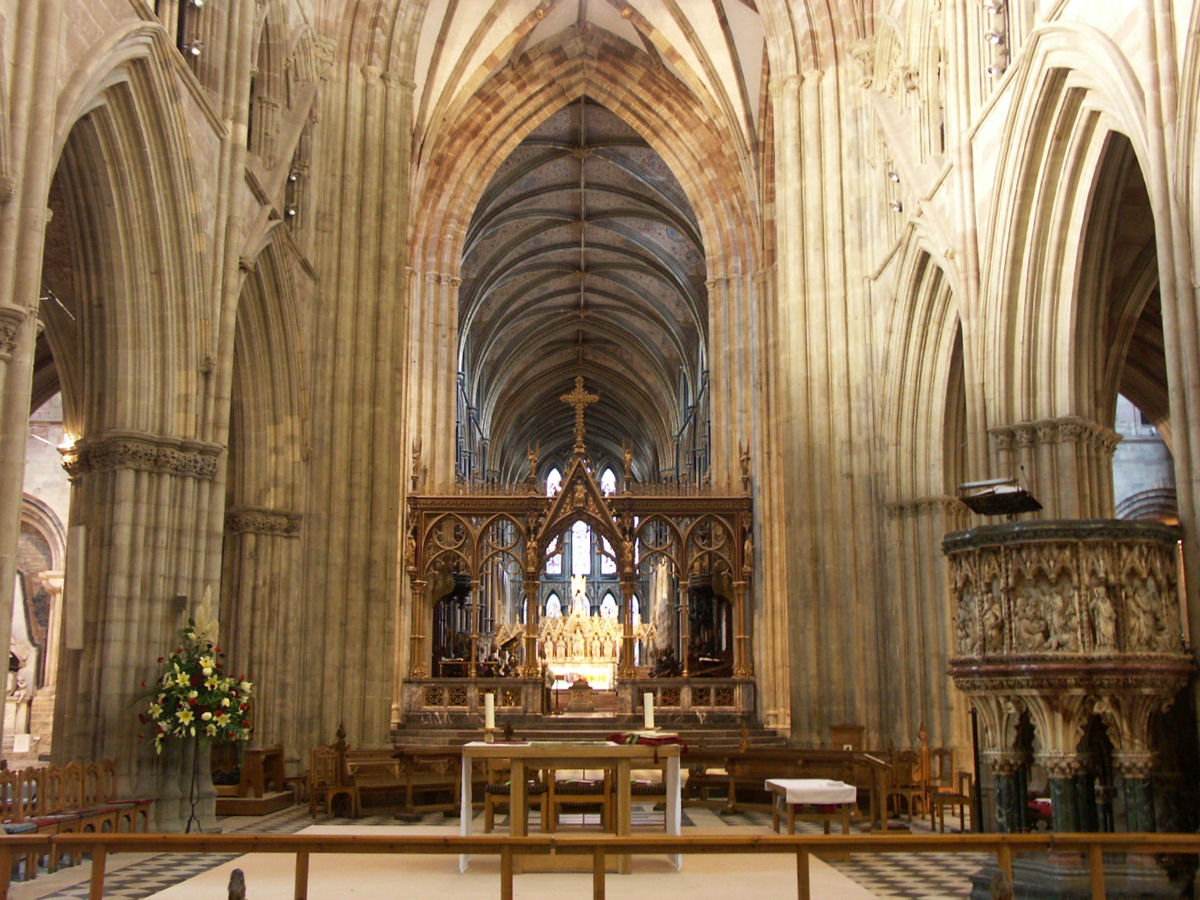
The altar area

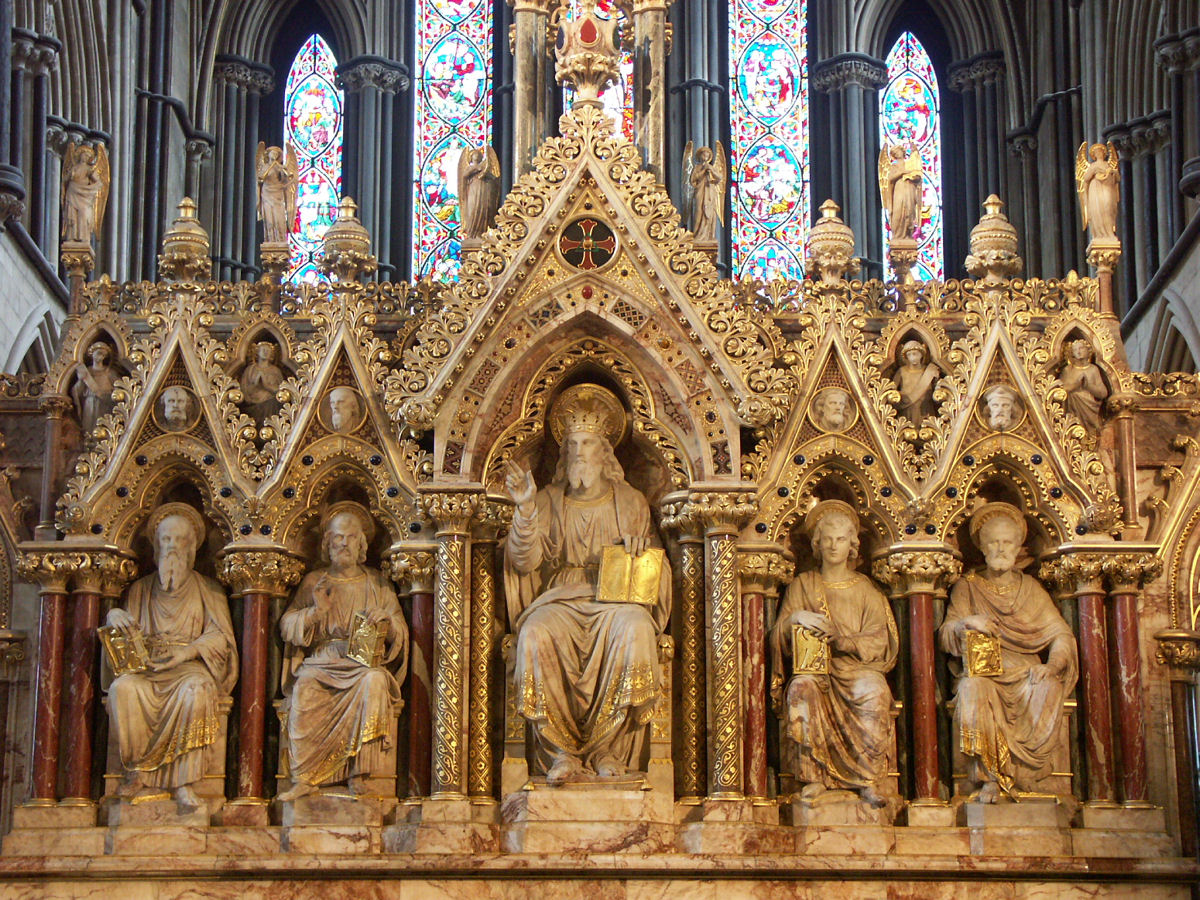
The high altar

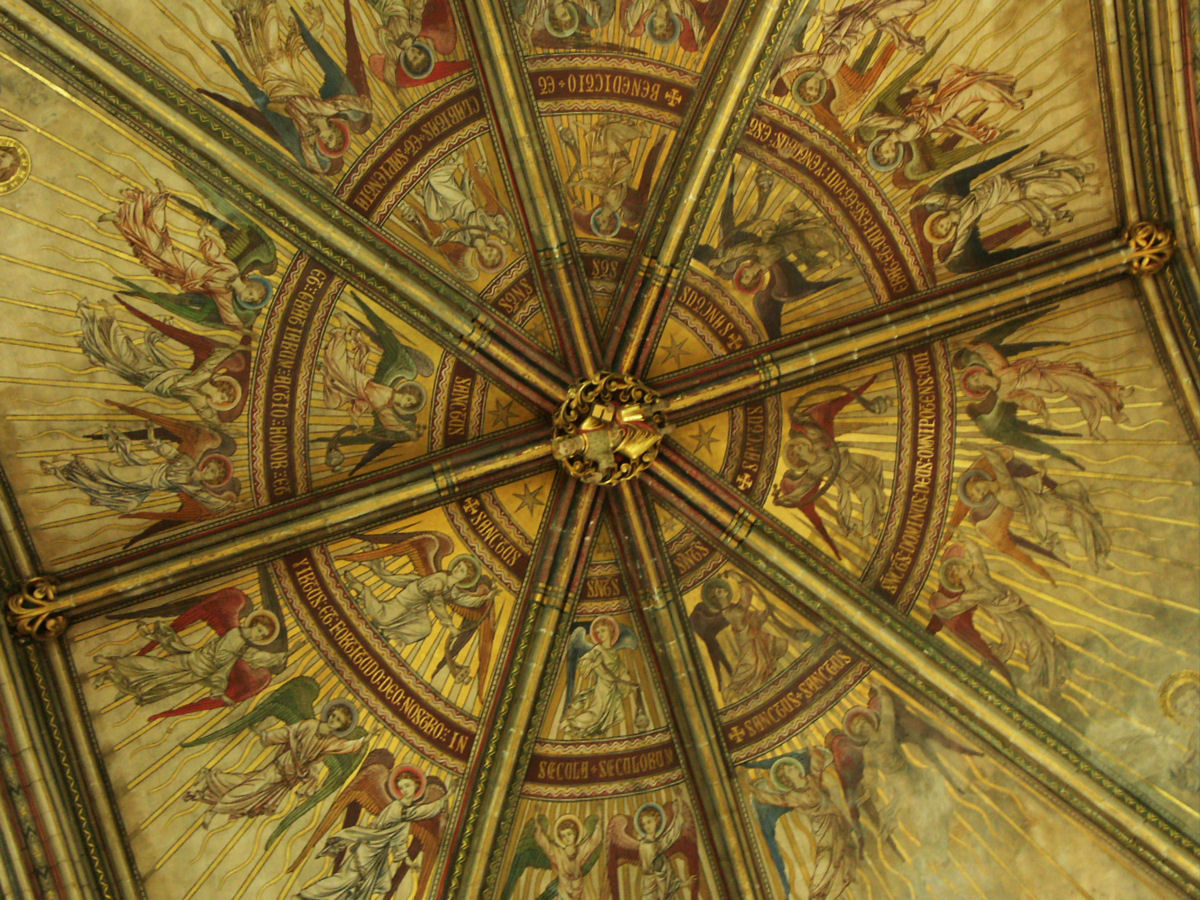
Painted ceiling

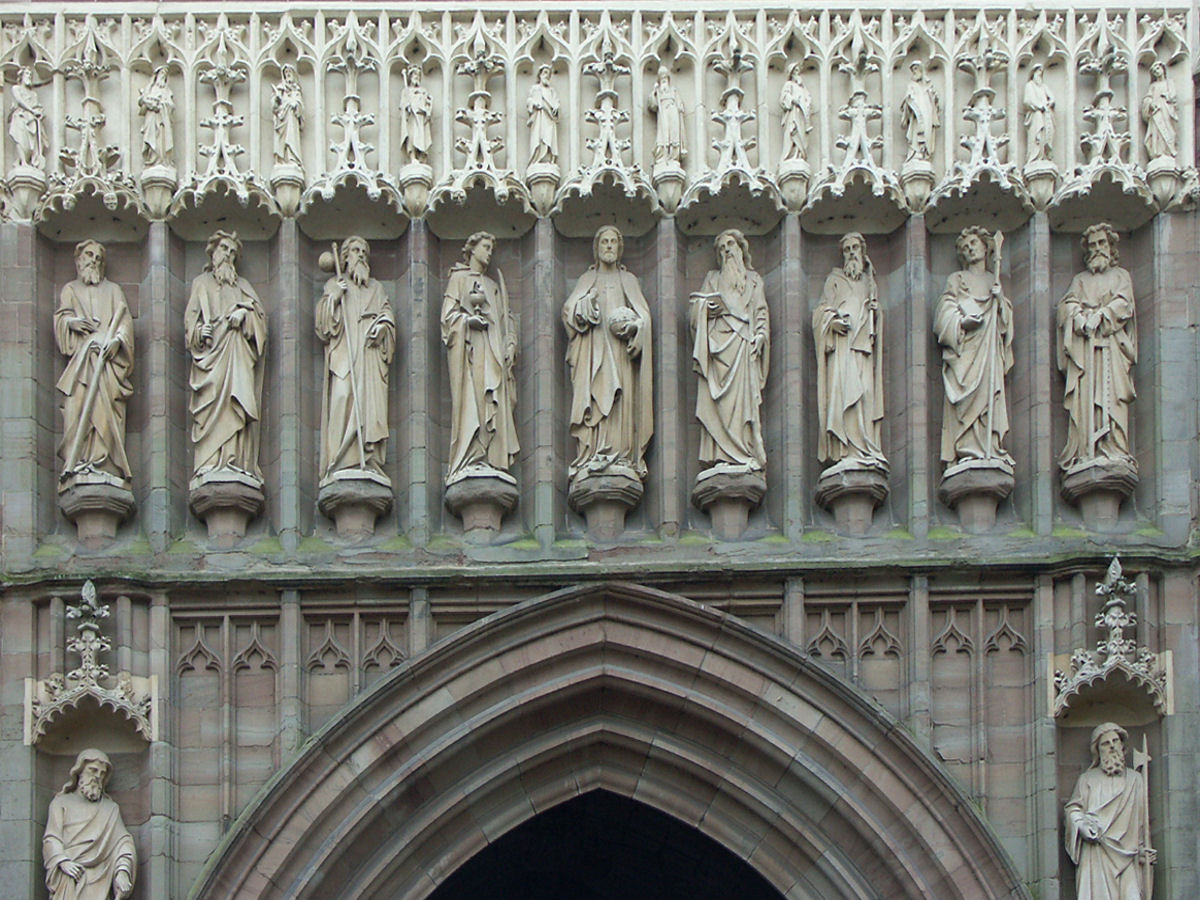
Statues above the portal

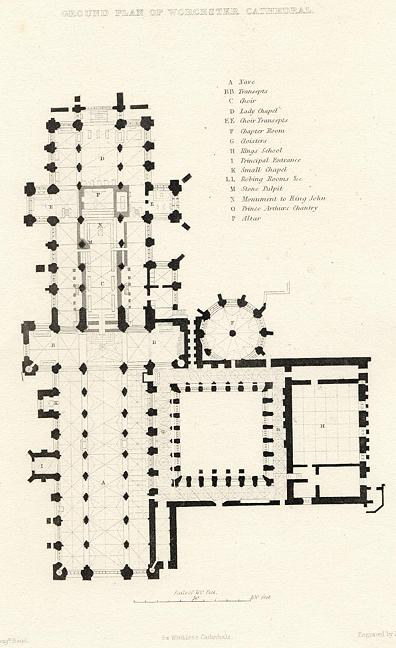
1836 Cathedral floorplan

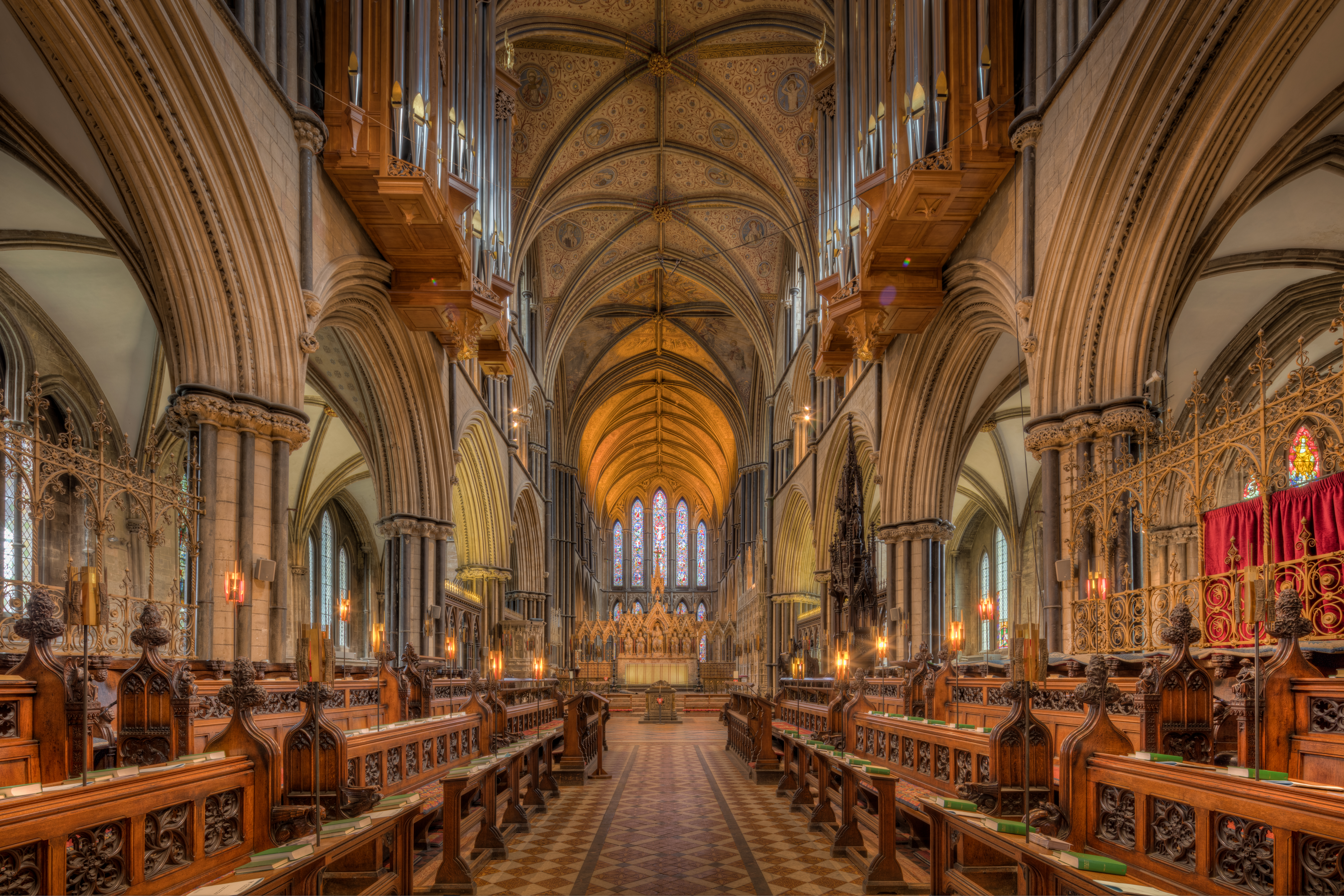
Taken from the choir

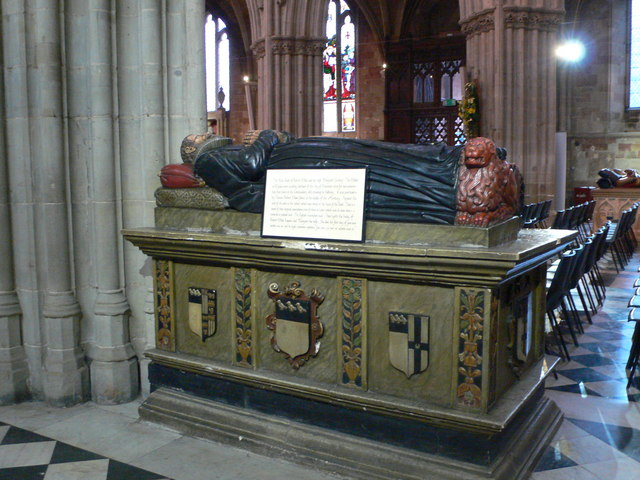
Monument to Robert Wilde in the nave

== See also ==
- Ealdred (archbishop of York)
- Bishop of Worcester
- Worcester Cathedral Voluntary Choir
- Architecture of the medieval cathedrals of England
- List of Gothic Cathedrals in Europe
- English Gothic architecture
- Romanesque architecture
- Church of England

== Sources and further reading ==
=== General ===
- John Noake (1866), The monastery and cathedral of Worcester, London: Longman, OL 7145051M
- Thomas Dingley (1867), History from marble, [Westminster]: Printed for the Camden Society, LCCN 17001261, OL 14133074M
- Worcester Cathedral (official guidebook), Scala Publishers Ltd. (2004) ISBN 1-85759-347-2
- Tatton-Brown, Tim; John Crook (2002). The English Cathedral. New Holland Publishers. ISBN 978-1-84330-120-2.
- R. K. Morris, ed. Medieval Art and Architecture at Worcester Cathedral, 1978
- Clifton-Taylor, Alec (1967). The Cathedrals of England (2nd ed.). Thames and Hudson Ltd. ISBN 978-0500200629.
- Pevsner, Nikolaus; Brookes, Alan (2007), "Worcester: Cathedral Church of Christ and the Blessed Virgin Mary", Worcestershire, The Buildings of England (Revised ed.), London: Yale University Press, pp. 672–702, ISBN 9780300112986, OL 10319229M

=== Medieval ===
- Willis-Bund, J. W.; Page, William, eds. (1971a). "Houses of Benedictine monks: Priory of St Mary, Worcester". A History of the County of Worcester: Volume 2. London: British History Online. pp. 94–112.
- Willis-Bund, J. W.; Page, William, eds. (1971b). "Hospitals: Worcester". A History of the County of Worcester: Volume 2. London: British History Online. pp. 175–179.
- Willis-Bund, J. W.; Page, William, eds. (1971c). "Friaries: Worcester". A History of the County of Worcester: Volume 2. London: British History Online. pp. 167–173.
- Ker, Neil Ripley, ed. (1964). Medieval Libraries of Great Britain. Royal Historical Society. pp. 205–215.
- Vincent, Nicholas (1994). "Two Papal Letters on the Wearing of the Jewish Badge, 1221 and 1229". Jewish Historical Studies. 34: 209–24. JSTOR 29779960.
- Mundill, Robin R. (2002). England's Jewish Solution: Experiment and Expulsion, 1262-1290. Cambridge University Press. ISBN 978-0-521-52026-3.
- de Blois, Peter (1194). "Against the Perfidy of the Jews". Medieval Sourcebook. University of Fordham. "A treatise addressed to John Bishop of Worcester, probably John of Coutances who held that See, 1194–8."
- Lazare, Bernard (1903), Antisemitism, its history and causes, New York: The International library publishing co., LCCN 03015369, OCLC 3055229, OL 7137045M
- Barrow, Julia (2013). "Worcester". In Lapidge, Michael; Blair, John; Keynes, Simon; Scragg, Donald (eds.). The Wiley Blackwell Encyclopedia of Anglo-Saxon England. Wiley-Blackwell. ISBN 978-0470656327.
- Knowles, David; Hadcock, R. Neville (1971). Medieval Religious Houses: England & Wales. Longman. ISBN 978-0-582-11230-8.
- Braunfels, Wolfgang (1972). Monasteries of Western Europe. Thames and Hudson. ISBN 978-0-691-00313-9.
- Dyer, Christopher (2000). Bromsgrove: a small town in Worcestershire in the Middle Ages. Occasional Publications. Vol. 9. Worcestershire Historical Society. ISSN 0140-9913.

=== Dissolution and Civil War ===
- Thornton, David E. (2018). "The Last Monks of Worcester Cathedral Priory" (PDF). Midland History. 43 (1). Routledge: 3–21. doi:10.1080/0047729X.2018.1461774. hdl:11693/50072. S2CID 159893638.
- More, William (1914), Fegan, Ethel S (ed.), Journal of Prior William More, London: Printed for the Worcestershire Historical Society, by M. Hughes and Clarke, OL 23307603M
- Atkin, Malcolm (2004). Worcestershire under arms. Barnsley: Pen and Sword. ISBN 978-1-84415-072-4. OL 11908594M.
- King, Peter (July 1968). "The Episcopate during the Civil Wars, 1642–1649". The English Historical Review. 83 (328). Oxford University Press: 523–537. doi:10.1093/ehr/lxxxiii.cccxxviii.523. JSTOR 564164.
