= Richard Tucker (wool-scourer) =

Richard Tucker (11 January 1856 – 15 December 1922) was a New Zealand wool-scourer and wool-classer. He was born in Auckland, New Zealand in 1856. He built up the largest wool-scouring plant in the Hawke's Bay Region and lived in Whakatu.
