= Karamū, New Zealand =

Settlement in Hawke's Bay Region, New Zealand

Karamū
- Rural community
- Interactive map of Karamū
- Coordinates: 39.636°S 176.880°E
- Country: New Zealand
- Region: Hawke's Bay
- Territorial authority: Hastings District
- Ward: Heretaunga General Ward; Kahurānaki General Ward; Takitimu Māori Ward
- Electorates: Tukituki; Ikaroa-Rāwhiti (Māori)

Government
  - Territorial Authority: Hastings District Council
  - Regional council: Hawke's Bay Regional Council

Area
  - Total: 13.20 km^{2} (5.10 sq mi)

Population (June 2025)
  - Total: 1,400
  - Density: 110/km^{2} (270/sq mi)
- Postcode(s): 4172

Karamū is a rural community in the Hastings District and Hawke's Bay Region of New Zealand's North Island. The area is on the eastern outskirts of Hastings city.

Karamu Estate covered the area in the 1870s. A dispute over the title was made moot by the challenging solicitor purchasing a large share in the estate. Part of the estate was sold in several farming allotments and residential sites in 1891. Further subdivisions occurred in 1919, and 1924. The remainder was subdivided in 1929.

== Demographics ==
The statistical area of Karamū, which also includes Whakatu, covers 13.20 km^{2} (5.10 sq mi) and had an estimated population of 1,400 as of June 2025, with a population density of 106 people per km^{2}.

Historical population
Year	Pop.	±% p.a.
2006	1,179	—
2013	1,218	+0.47%
2018	1,305	+1.39%
2023	1,371	+0.99%
The 2006 population is for a larger area of 13.29 km^{2}. Source:

Karamū had a population of 1,371 in the 2023 New Zealand census, an increase of 66 people (5.1%) since the 2018 census, and an increase of 153 people (12.6%) since the 2013 census. There were 708 males and 663 females in 432 dwellings. 2.6% of people identified as LGBTIQ+. The median age was 39.6 years (compared with 38.1 years nationally). There were 264 people (19.3%) aged under 15 years, 264 (19.3%) aged 15 to 29, 645 (47.0%) aged 30 to 64, and 198 (14.4%) aged 65 or older.

People could identify as more than one ethnicity. The results were 67.2% European (Pākehā); 40.9% Māori; 7.2% Pasifika; 2.4% Asian; 0.4% Middle Eastern, Latin American and African New Zealanders (MELAA); and 3.7% other, which includes people giving their ethnicity as "New Zealander". English was spoken by 96.5%, Māori by 10.3%, Samoan by 1.3%, and other languages by 5.3%. No language could be spoken by 2.0% (e.g. too young to talk). New Zealand Sign Language was known by 0.4%. The percentage of people born overseas was 12.7, compared with 28.8% nationally.

Religious affiliations were 30.6% Christian, 0.4% Hindu, 5.0% Māori religious beliefs, 0.2% Buddhist, 0.4% New Age, and 0.2% other religions. People who answered that they had no religion were 54.5%, and 7.9% of people did not answer the census question.

Of those at least 15 years old, 162 (14.6%) people had a bachelor's or higher degree, 600 (54.2%) had a post-high school certificate or diploma, and 336 (30.4%) people exclusively held high school qualifications. The median income was $41,700, compared with $41,500 nationally. 96 people (8.7%) earned over $100,000 compared to 12.1% nationally. The employment status of those at least 15 was 591 (53.4%) full-time, 156 (14.1%) part-time, and 48 (4.3%) unemployed.
