= John Clyve =

English gothic architect

John Clyve was an English gothic architect, responsible for the nave, tower and west front of Worcester Cathedral. He is mentioned as a mason in connection with the cathedral cloisters circa 1376/77.
