= Worcester Cathedral Voluntary Choir =

- Choir
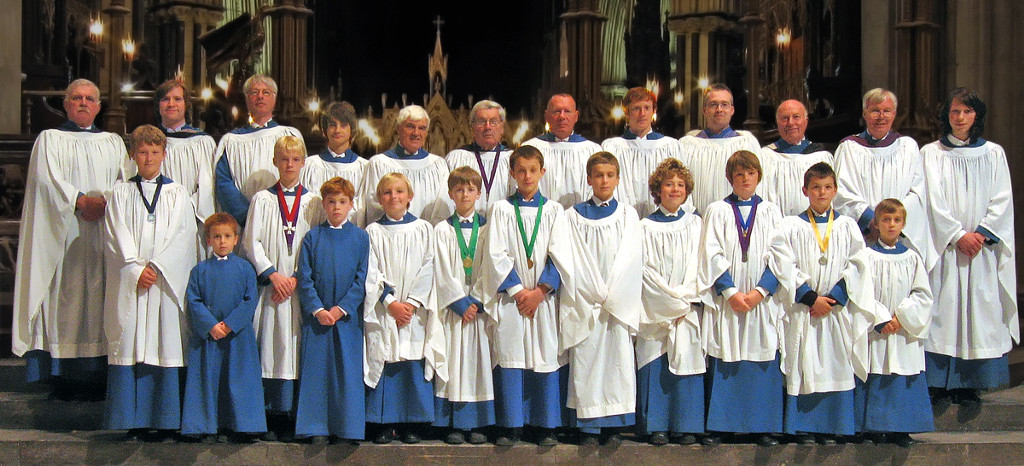
- The choir in 2010
- Origin: Worcester Cathedral, England, UK
- Founded: October 1874
- Choirmaster: Nicholas Freestone
- Associated groups: Worcester Cathedral Choir, Worcester Cathedral Chamber Choir
- Website: www.worcestercathedral.co.uk

The Worcester Cathedral Voluntary Choir is an Anglican choir made up of boy and girl trebles. The choir is based at Worcester Cathedral, Worcester, United Kingdom and regularly sings at the 6:30pm Sunday Evening Worship.

== History ==
The choir was founded in October 1874 as a choir of boys and men primarily to sing at the newly formed 6:30pm Sunday Evensong and to sing other services for the Cathedral Choir during school holidays.

In 2021, the choir was re-formed as part of a wider reorganization of the cathedral's music department. It now operates as part of the Choir Church programme and offers an opportunity for girls and boys up to the age of 13 from schools across the city to take part in regular music making in the cathedral.

The choir remains under the direction of the cathedral's Assistant Director of Music, and is accompanied by the Organ Scholar although for many years had an organist of its own.

The choir formerly sang at a number of important services each year during the school holidays, including the Palm Sunday morning Eucharist, and Midnight Mass maintaining some of its original aim of relieving commitments from the Cathedral Choir.

The choir released two CDs in recent years, and sang in the live BBC television broadcast of Christmas Day morning Eucharist in 2007.

The choir has also been on a number of tours, including to Paris in 2008 and Belgium in 2010 and 2014, singing at Notre Dame Cathedral, Brussels Cathedral and Ghent Cathedral.

== Discography ==
- Christ Triumphant - Worcester Cathedral Voluntary Choir (2002)
- How lovely are thy dwellings - Worcester Cathedral Voluntary Choir (2004)
- Be thou my vision - Worcester Cathedral Voluntary Choir (2011)
