= John Curling =

New Zealand politician

John Curling was a member of the New Zealand Legislative Council from 1 June 1857 to 1 May 1861, when he resigned.

He was from the Hawke's Bay Region.
