= 3 Piece Suite (band) =

Australian pop band

- Labels: MGM
- Members: Clive Suares; Dwane Lee; Terri Lee

3 Piece Suite is an Australian pop band made up of singers Clive Suares, and brothers Dwane and Terri Lee. They released their debut single in May 2002, a cover of Del Shannon's "Runaway". It debuted at number 60 on the ARIA Single chart, rising to 54.

== Discography ==
singles

- "Runaway" (2002) - MGM Aus #54
