= Clive, New Zealand =

Town in New Zealand

Clive Waipūreku (Māori)
- Town
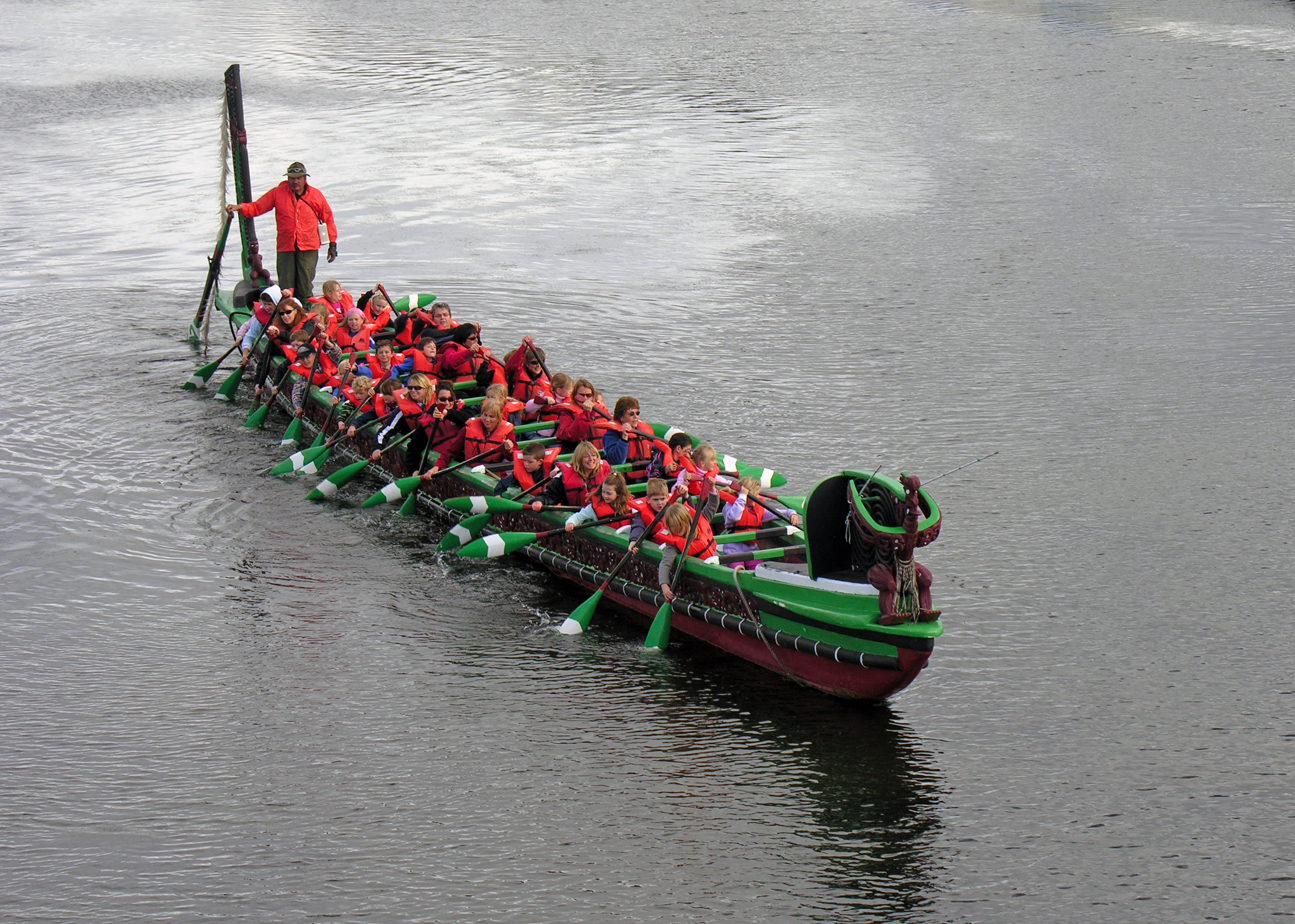
- Te Awa o Mokotūāraro / Clive River bridge St Francis Church Clive entrance sign St Joseph's Church Waka ama on Te Awa o Mokotūāraro View of Te Mata Peak from walking trail
- Interactive map of Clive
- Coordinates: 39°35′S 176°55′E
- Country: New Zealand
- Region: Hawke's Bay Region
- Territorial authority: Hastings District
- Ward: Heretaunga general ward; Takitimu Māori ward
- Electorates: Tukituki; Ikaroa-Rāwhiti (Māori)

Government
  - Territorial authority: Hastings District Council
  - Mayor of Hastings: Wendy Schollum

Area
  - Total: 3.35 km^{2} (1.29 sq mi)

Population (June 2025)
  - Total: 2,040
  - Density: 609/km^{2} (1,580/sq mi)

Clive (Māori: Waipūreku) is a small town, ten kilometres from the city centres of both Napier and Hastings in the Hawke's Bay region of New Zealand's North Island. It is close to the mouth of Te Awa o Mokotūāraro, which was previously known as the Clive River.

The town is part of the Hastings district. It was named (like many of the towns in the vicinity) after a prominent person from imperial India, in this case Robert Clive, better known as "Clive of India". The name was given by John Curling.

The town of Clive is mainly rural, yet with the increasing number of people moving into Hawke's Bay, and Clive being at the meeting point of Hastings and Napier, new subdivisions are being built to accommodate the growing population.

Clive is home to the Hawke's Bay Rowing Club who train on the Clive River. The Hawke's Bay Rowing Regatta is held on the first weekend of the year and was started in 1872.

== Demographics ==
Stats NZ describes Clive as a small urban area, which covers 3.35 km^{2} (1.29 sq mi). It had an estimated population of 2,040 as of June 2025, with a population density of 609 people per km^{2}.

Historical population
Year	Pop.	±% p.a.
2006	1,875	—
2013	1,746	−1.01%
2018	1,887	+1.57%
2023	1,992	+1.09%
The 2006 population is for a larger area of 14.87 km^{2}. Source:

Clive had a population of 1,992 in the 2023 New Zealand census, an increase of 105 people (5.6%) since the 2018 census, and an increase of 246 people (14.1%) since the 2013 census. There were 1,005 males, 981 females, and 6 people of other genders in 702 dwellings. 2.3% of people identified as LGBTIQ+. The median age was 44.2 years (compared with 38.1 years nationally). There were 342 people (17.2%) aged under 15 years, 333 (16.7%) aged 15 to 29, 936 (47.0%) aged 30 to 64, and 378 (19.0%) aged 65 or older.

People could identify as more than one ethnicity. The results were 84.8% European (Pākehā); 21.8% Māori; 2.9% Pasifika; 5.1% Asian; 0.5% Middle Eastern, Latin American and African New Zealanders (MELAA); and 1.5% other, which includes people giving their ethnicity as "New Zealander". English was spoken by 97.6%, Māori by 4.8%, Samoan by 0.3%, and other languages by 7.1%. No language could be spoken by 1.4% (e.g. too young to talk). New Zealand Sign Language was known by 1.4%. The percentage of people born overseas was 15.1, compared with 28.8% nationally.

Religious affiliations were 27.1% Christian, 1.4% Hindu, 0.5% Islam, 2.1% Māori religious beliefs, 0.8% Buddhist, 0.8% New Age, 0.2% Jewish, and 1.1% other religions. People who answered that they had no religion were 59.0%, and 7.2% of people did not answer the census question.

Of those at least 15 years old, 312 (18.9%) people had a bachelor's or higher degree, 966 (58.5%) had a post-high school certificate or diploma, and 372 (22.5%) people exclusively held high school qualifications. The median income was $41,800, compared with $41,500 nationally. 189 people (11.5%) earned over $100,000 compared to 12.1% nationally. The employment status of those at least 15 was 870 (52.7%) full-time, 237 (14.4%) part-time, and 27 (1.6%) unemployed.

== Marae ==
The town has two marae.

Kohupātiki Marae and Tanenuiarangi meeting house are a meeting place of the Ngāti Kahungunu hapū of Ngati Hōri and Ngāti Toaharapaki.

Matahiwi Marae and Te Matau a Māui meeting house are a meeting place of the Ngāti Kahungunu hapū of Ngāti Hāwea and Ngāti Kautere.

In October 2020, the Government committed $6,020,910 from the Provincial Growth Fund to upgrade a group of 18 marae, including both Kohupātiki and Matahiwi. The funding was expected to create 39 jobs.

== Education ==
Clive School is a co-educational state primary school, with a roll of 216 as of July 2026. It opened in 1879, preceded by East Clive School in 1859 and West Clive School in 1870.

== Railway station ==
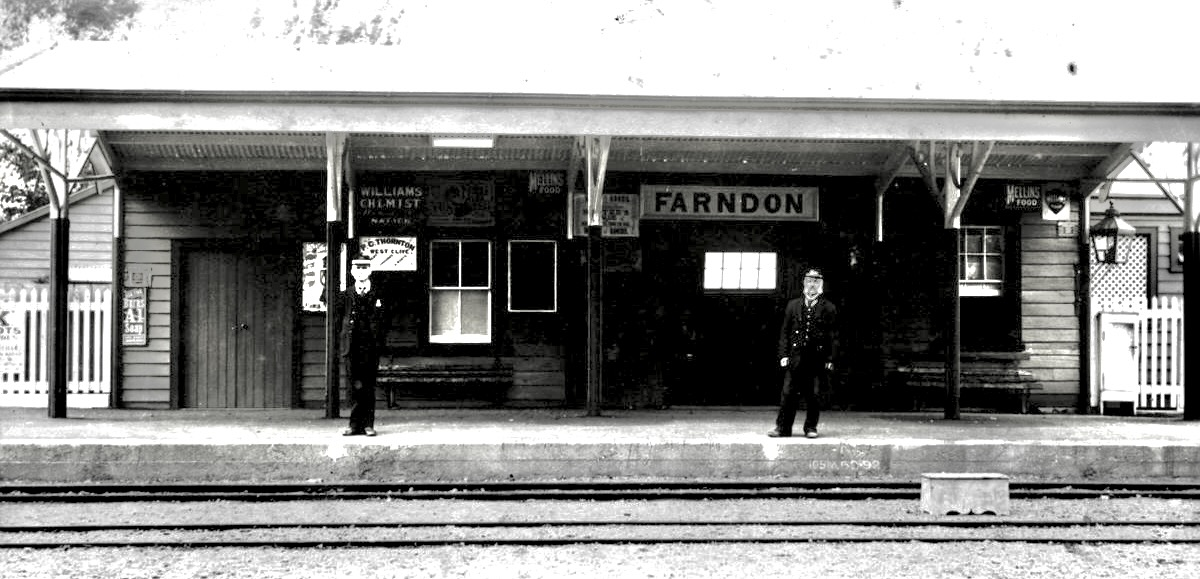
Farndon between 1900 and 1916

Farndon railway station, across the river, near Farndon Park, opened on 12 October 1874, with the first 18.8 km (11.7 mi) section of the Palmerston North–Gisborne Line, from Napier to Hastings. However, it wasn't until 1 January 1875 that a contract for a 5th class station and stationmaster's house was let to Richard Trestral. A platform was added in 1876, when a 30 ft (9.1 m) x 20 ft (6.1 m) goods shed was moved from Te Aute. In 1877 a waiting room was moved from Paki Paki, when Angus McKay built a Post & Telegraph office at Farndon. By 1896 Farndon had a 4th class station, platform, cart approach, goods shed, loading bank, cattle yards, stationmaster's house, urinals and a passing loop for 20 wagons, extended to 41 in 1911 and 80 in 1940. Sheep yards were added in 1899 and a luggage room and verandah in 1900. In 1912 it became a tablet station. On 20 August 1923 the station's name was changed from Farndon to Clive. In 1926 it was noted the platform was 190 ft (58 m). In 1931 Clive had a stationmaster and two clerks. A railway house was built in 1933. On 29 December 1961 the station burnt down. It was replaced in 1962 by a 25 ft (7.6 m) x 10 ft (3.0 m) station, which closed to all traffic on Sunday 25 May 1975. Only a single track now runs through the former station site.

	Former adjoining stations	
Whakatu; Line open, station closed 4.68 km (2.91 mi) towards PN	Palmerston North–Gisborne Line	Awatoto; Line open, station closed 3.49 km (2.17 mi) towards Gisborne
