= Clive Foster =

UK's first Windrush Commissioner

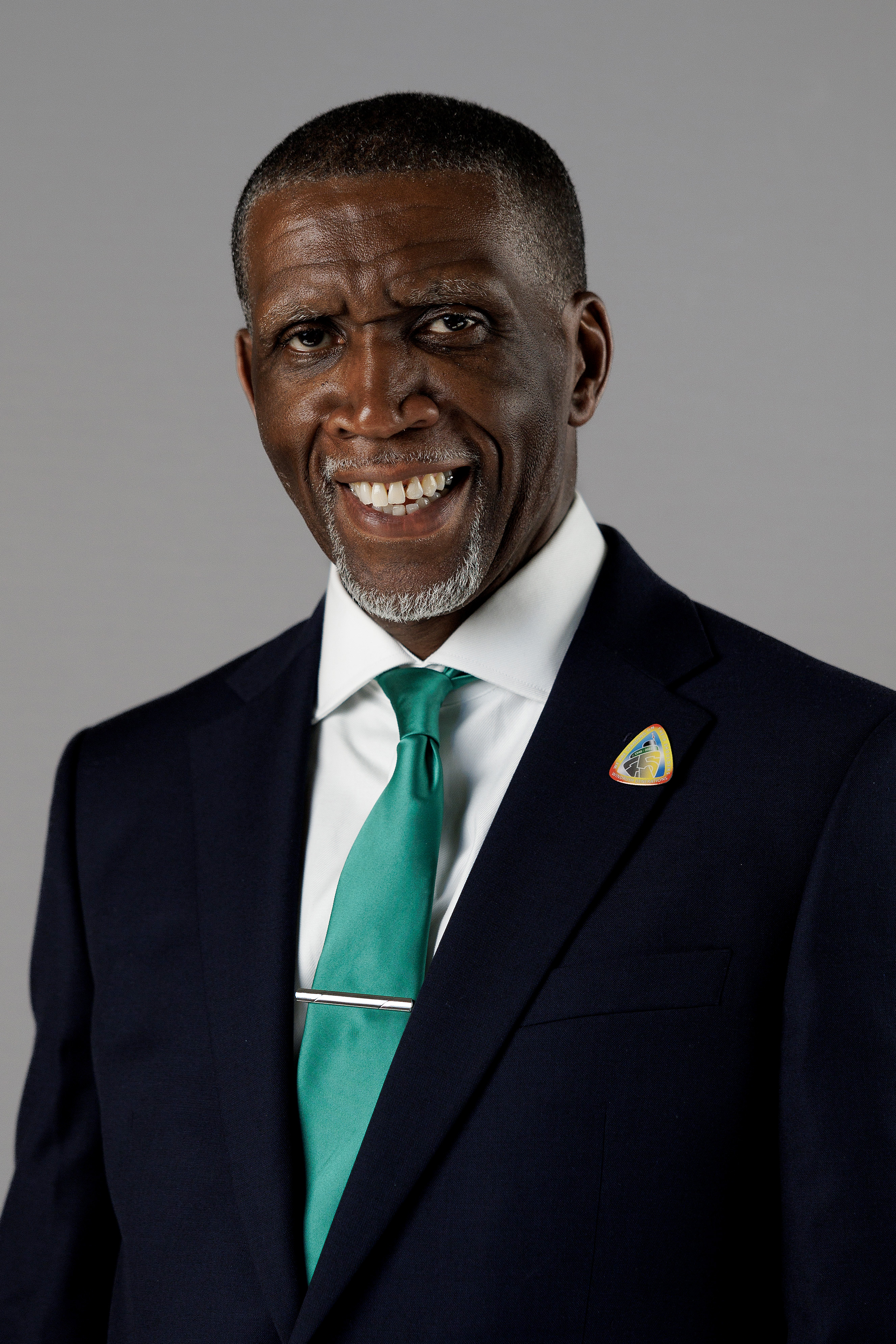
Reverend Clive Foster in 2025

Clive Foster MBE (born October 1964) is a pastor based in Nottingham, United Kingdom, who was appointed by the UK government as its first Windrush Commissioner on 18 June 2025. Foster, who will hold the post for three years, will oversee the UK government's response to the Windrush scandal, which saw a number of people who arrived in the UK on the Empire Windrush in 1948 wrongfully detained and threatened with deportation. In addition, Foster is also the founder of Nottingham Windrush Support Forum, and serves as vice-chair of the Windrush National Organisation. His appointment was announced by Yvette Cooper, the Home Secretary, ahead of Windrush Day on 22 June.

Foster is the son of Jamaican migrants, who arrived in the United Kingdom in 1959. He is a senior pastor at the Pilgrim Church in Nottingham.

Clive Foster MBE held his official launch and listening event at Hackney Town Hall on 16 July 2025.

On 6 January 2026, the Windrush Commissioner announced the creation of the Windrush Councils Network, intended to bring together local authorities to share experiences, strengthen community engagement, and inform national policy on Windrush-related issues. The inaugural meeting of the network took place on 6 March 2026.
