= William Whitehead (organist) =

William Whitehead (born 23 March 1970) is an English concert organist. Born in Billericay at St Andrew's Centre Hospital, Essex. His father was the late Dr Peter Whitehead, a Pathologist at Billericay. William was trained through the Oxbridge and Cathedral route. One of his recordings, Dances of Life and Death (released by Chandos Records) was awarded a Diapason Découverte in Diapason Magazine. He is currently Associate Organist of Lincoln's Inn in London. He is curator of the Orgelbüchlein Project, an international collaboration to complete Bach's Little Organ Book. He teaches organ scholars at both Oxford and Cambridge Universities.

== Training ==
Whitehead was a pupil at Taunton School. After a period of study at Hereford Cathedral, he took up a place at University College, Oxford as Organ Scholar. This was followed by a year's study at the Royal Academy of Music in London. At the same time he held the position of Organ Scholar of Westminster Abbey.

== Career ==
His first appointment after study was as Assistant Organist of Rochester Cathedral where he was an inaugural director of the new girls' choir. Subsequent appointments were as an Academic Studies Lecturer at the Royal Academy of Music and as Director of Music at St Mary's, Bourne Street.

Whitehead co-directed the London Organ Forum with Ann Elise Smoot. He was a Professor of Organ at Trinity College of Music in London, and examines for the Royal College of Organists. He is a solo organist and also plays continuo with groups such as the Gabrieli Consort, Instruments of Time and Truth, Dunedin Consort and The Academy of Ancient Music. He appeared as a solo organist in the 2017 BBC Proms and at the Royal Festival Hall in 2018.
