= Te Awa o Mokotūāraro =

River in the Hawke's Bay Region, New Zealand

Te Awa o Mokotūāraro Clive River
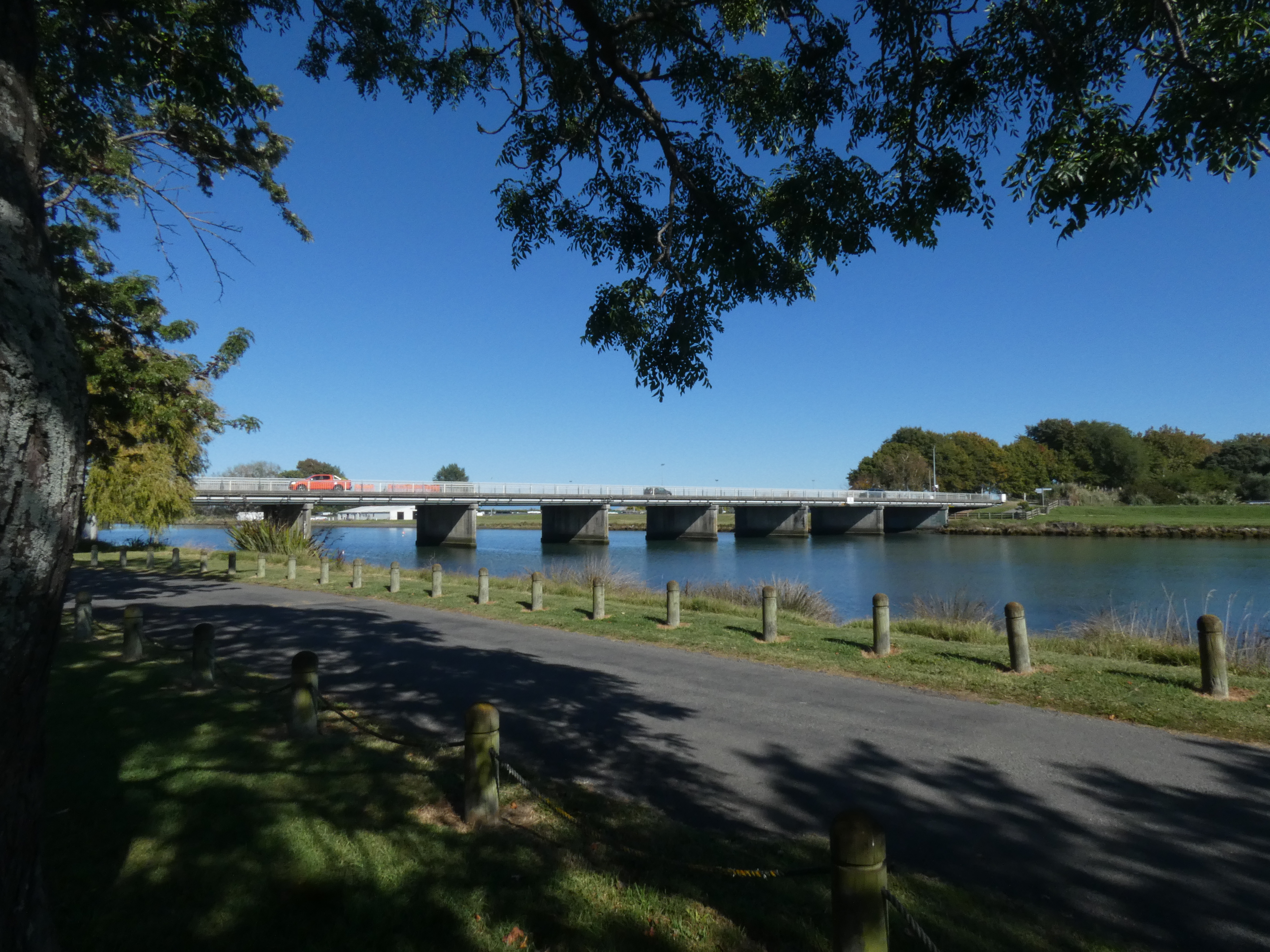
- The Clive River Bridge
- Route of Te Awa o Mokotūāraro
- Mouth of Te Awa o Mokotūāraro Te Awa o Mokotūāraro (North Island)

Location
- Country: New Zealand
- Island: North Island
- Region: Hawke's Bay
- District: Hastings

Physical characteristics
- Source: Confluence of Karamū Stream and Raupare Stream
  - location: Whakatu
  - coordinates: 39.60169°S 176.87349°E
- Mouth: Hawke Bay
  - location: Waitangi Estuary
  - coordinates: 39°34′19″S 176°55′34″E
  - elevation: 0 m (0 ft)
- Length: 33 km (21 mi)

Basin features
- Progression: Te Awa o Mokotūāraro → Waitangi Estuary→ Hawke Bay → Pacific Ocean
- Cities: Whakatu, Clive
- Bridges: Railway Bridge (Palmerston North–Gisborne Line), Clive Bridge

Te Awa o Mokotūāraro, formerly known as the Clive River, is a river in Hawke's Bay, New Zealand. At 33 kilometres (21 mi) long, it is the shortest of the main rivers flowing through the Heretaunga Plains. It flows into Hawke Bay near the town of Clive.

Te Awa o Mokotūāraro occupies the former course of the Ngaruroro River, which in 1867 changed flow to its present course during major flooding.

== Geography ==
Getting most of its drainage from irrigation ditches around the Heretaunga Plains, the river system starts from the west of Flaxmere (just south of the Ngaruroro River), where it flows south-east, west of Hastings before making a sharp, right angle turn towards Havelock North. The river then flows north-east past Havelock North, where it is known as the Karamū Stream, and again flowing past Hastings, this time to the east of Hastings. The river finally turns in an east direction there it flows past the town of Clive and into the Pacific Ocean.

== Names ==
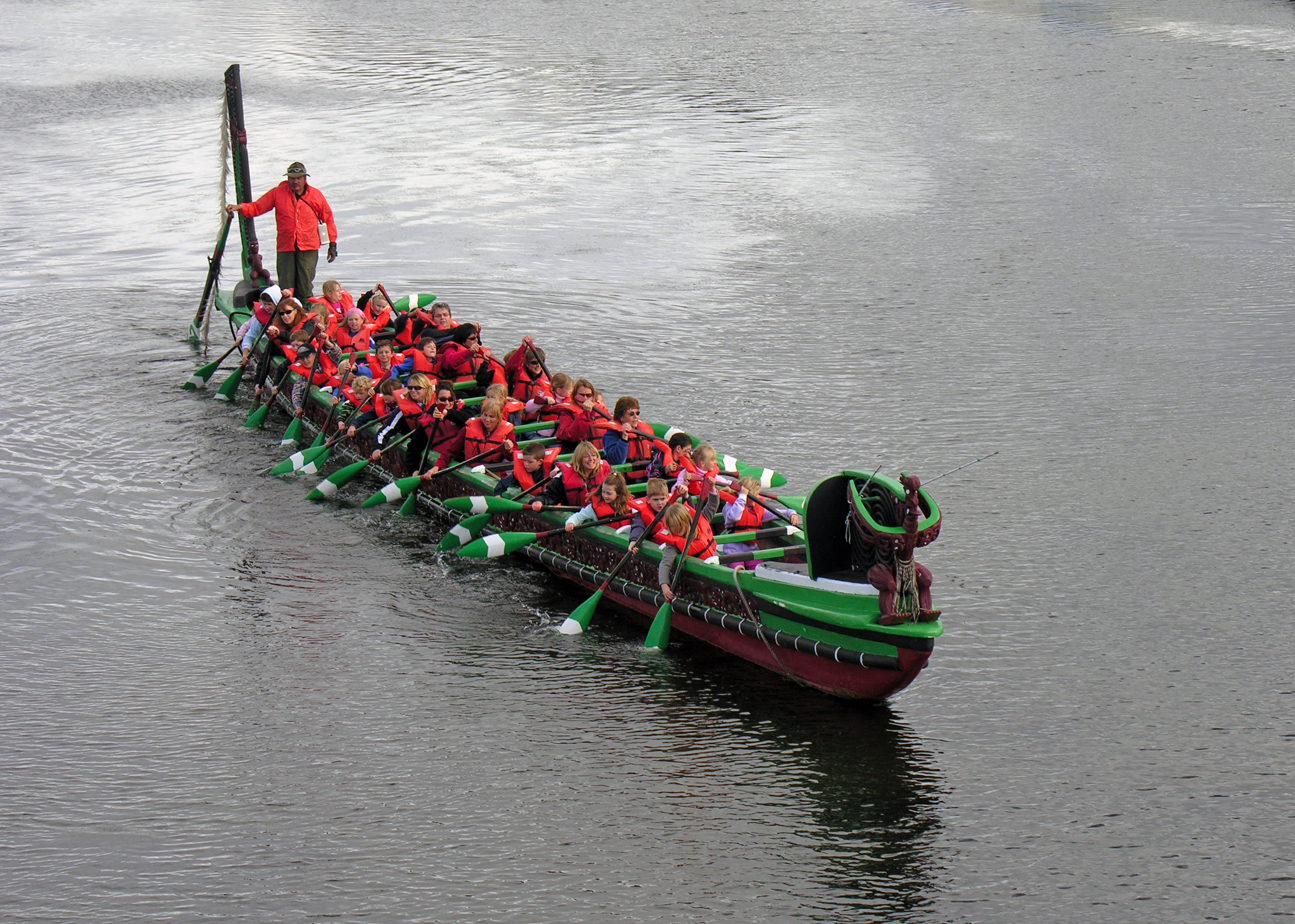
Waka-paddling class on Te Awa o Mokotūāraro

The bed of the river is a remnant of the original course of the Ngaruroro River before flood control diversion works were completed in 1969. It was officially named after Clive of India in 1975.

It has also been referred to with variants of his Battle of Plassey, such as Plasse in 1857 and Plassey, or Plassy in 1859. Those names were no longer used by the 1920s, but it isn't clear when their use ended.

The restoration of the full original name Ngaruroro Moko-tū-ā-raro-ki-Rangatira, a name decreed by Ruawharo the tohunga of te waka Tākitimu, was proposed in 2022. The Minister for Land Information officially renamed the river to Te Awa o Mokotūāraro in June 2023. The new official name is a shortened version of the full original name.

== See also ==
- List of rivers of New Zealand
