= Thomas Young (bishop) =

Archbishop of York from 1561 to 1568

The Most Reverend Thomas Young
- Archbishop of York
- Installed: 1561
- Term ended: 1568
- Predecessor: Nicholas Heath
- Successor: Edmund Grindal

Orders
- Consecration: 21 January 1560 by Matthew Parker

Personal details
- Born: 1507
- Died: 26 June 1568 (aged 60–61)
- Denomination: Church of England

Thomas Young (1507 – 26 June 1568) was a Bishop of St David's and Archbishop of York (1561–1568).

== Life ==
He was the son of John Young and Eleanor his wife, and was born at Hodgeston, Pembrokeshire, in 1507. He became a student at Broadgates Hall, Oxford, and graduated B. A. 14 June 1529, M. A. 19 March 1533, as secular chaplain, B.C.L. 17 February 1538, (disputation for) D.C.L. 13 February 1566, and was admitted in London. He became principal of his hall in 1542, and resigned in 1546. He had already become vicar of Llanfihangel Castell Gwallter, Cardiganshire, in 1541, rector of Hogeston in 1542, and, in the same year, of Nash-with-Upton, Pembrokeshire. In 1542 he became precentor of St David's Cathedral, entering into residence in 1547. Opposing the actions of Robert Ferrar, Bishop of St David's, who had made him his commissary, he, with others of the canons, drew up articles against him. These were investigated by a commission appointed by Edward VI in 1549. Ferrar, in vindication of himself, accused Young and another canon of despoiling the cathedral of crosses, chalices, censers, and other plate, jewels, and ornaments. John Foxe comments very severely on Young's conduct.

On Queen Mary I's accession Young was one of the six who, in convocation in 1553, publicly avowed his adherence to the Reformation and resigned his preferments. He was a Marian exile in Germany. His successor, Morgan Phillips, fellow of Oriel College, Oxford, was collated precentor on 31 May 1554.

On the accession of Elizabeth, Phillips was deprived (1559) and Young was restored. He was shortly afterwards appointed with others on a commission to visit the Welsh cathedrals. On the deprivation of Bishop Henry Morgan, he was elected bishop of St David's on 6 December 1559, confirmed on 18 January 1560, consecrated at Lambeth on 21 January 1560 by Archbishop Matthew Parker and the bishops of London, Ely, and Bedford. Through Lord Robert Dudley, he begged to obtain the restoration of the temporalities of his see, which were given on 23 March. He received licence to hold in commendam the precentorship and other positions, because of the extent of his diocese and its expense. On the deprivation of Nicholas Heath, archbishop of York, Parker recommended Young to the queen as Heath's successor. He was elected archbishop on 27 January 1561, and confirmed on 25 February receiving restitution of the temporalities on 4 March 1561.

In the north Young was immersed in the work of pacifying the country, bringing it to conformity in religion, and acting as the royal representative in political and religious matters. He was an active president of the Council of the North, judging on assize, and reviving the archiepiscopal mint. He was present with Parker at the interviews Elizabeth had in 1561 with De Quadra as to possible reunion through a general council. He was given charge of the young Charles Stuart, son of the Countess of Lennox, and ordered to repress the Catholic tendencies of the family. In his archiepiscopal visitation he claimed the right to visit the diocese of Durham, but was resisted. In 1561 he sat on the commission at Lambeth which drew up the articles. On 26 March 1564 the University of Oxford conferred on him the degree of D.C.L. In 1564 he visited and reformed the collegiate church at Manchester. In 1566, on account of his age, a suffragan, with the title of bishop of Nottingham, was consecrated to assist him (Richard Barnes, 9 March 1566).

He died at Sheffield on 26 June 1568, and was buried in the east end of the choir of York Minster, where his monument remains.

== Family ==
He married, first, a daughter of George Constantine; secondly, Jane, daughter of Thomas Kynaston of Estwick, Staffordshire, by whom he had a son, Sir George Young (fl. 1612).

== Arms ==
Coat of arms of Thomas Young

Notes
While serving as a bishop Young's arms would be displayed impaled with the arms of the diocese and topped by a mitre.
Escutcheon
Party per pale Or and Azure three pelicans in piety counterchanged on a chevron Argent three escallops Gules.

Church of England titles
Preceded by Henry Morgan	Bishop of St David's; 1560–1561	Succeeded by Richard Davies
Preceded by Nicholas Heath	Archbishop of York; 1561–1568	Succeeded by Edmund Grindal
