= K. George Thomas =

Indian photochemist, nanomaterial scientist and professor

- Born: Kerala, India
- Education: Mar Thoma College, Tiruvalla; Savitribai Phule Pune University; University of Kerala; National Institute for Interdisciplinary Science and Technology
- Known for: Studies on photoresponsive nanomaterials
- Awards: 2004 CRSI Bronze Medal; 2005 MRSI Medal; 2006 Shanti Swarup Bhatnagar Prize; 2015 MRSI-ICSC Super Conductivity and Materials Science Prize
- Scientific career
- Fields: Nanomaterials; Photochemistry
- Workplaces: National Institute for Interdisciplinary Science and Technology; Indian Institute of Science Education and Research, Thiruvananthapuram; University of Notre Dame; Jawaharlal Nehru Centre for Advanced Scientific Research
- Doctoral advisor: K. Saramma; Manapurathu Verghese George

Kakkudiyil George Thomas is an Indian photochemist, nanomaterial scientist and a professor at the Indian Institute of Science Education and Research, Thiruvananthapuram. He is known for his studies on photoresponsive nanomaterials and is an elected fellow of the Indian National Science Academy and the Indian Academy of Sciences. The Council of Scientific and Industrial Research, the apex agency of the Government of India for scientific research, awarded him the Shanti Swarup Bhatnagar Prize for Science and Technology, one of the highest Indian science awards, in 2006, for his contributions to chemical sciences.

== Biography ==
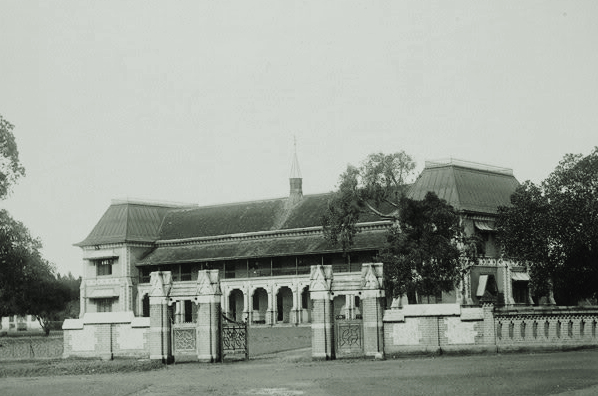
University of Kerala

K. George Thomas, born in the south Indian state of Kerala, did his early schooling at his home state before joining Savitribai Phule Pune University from where he completed his master's course (MSc) in chemistry in 1983. He returned to Kerala for his doctoral studies under the guidance of K. Saramma and secured a PhD from the University of Kerala in 1989. His post-doctoral studies were at the Photosciences and Photonics Group of the Manapurathu Verghese George at the National Institute for Interdisciplinary Science and Technology (NIIST) as a research associate. After completing his studies in 1994, he continued at NIIST to start his career as a scientist. Subsequently, he joined the Indian Institute of Science Education and Research, Thiruvananthapuram and serves the institution as a professor while continuing his researches at NIIST. He has also had various stints at the University of Notre Dame in 1999, 2003, 2004 and 2005 as a visiting faculty member and is an honorary faculty fellow at Jawaharlal Nehru Centre for Advanced Scientific Research.

== Legacy ==
The research of Thomas has been focused on photoresponsive nanomaterials and his work is reported to have assisted in widening the understanding about their applications. He also worked on self-organization of molecules on surfaces and has developed methodologies for modulating molecular organization through the introduction of functional groups. Thus, he developed a number of near-infrared absorbing sensitizers which are relevant in biological imaging and optical data storage applications. He holds an international patent for one the processes he has developed viz. Squaraine based dyes and process for preparation thereof. His research has been documented by way of chapters in three books authored/edited by others and several peer-reviewed articles; the online article repository of the Indian Academy of Sciences has listed 54 of them. He sits on the advisory board of the Centre for Nano and Soft Matter Sciences of the Department of Science and Technology and is the vice-president of the Asian and Oceanian Photochemistry Association. He has also delivered several keynote addresses and plenary lectures including the Inter Academy Seoul Science Forum held in Seoul on 3 November 2016 and the Nano Biotek 2016 held at New Delhi on 24 November 2016.

== Awards and honors ==
Thomas received the Bronze Medal of the Chemical Research Society of India in 2004 and the MRSI Medal of the Material Research Society of India in 2005; MRSI would honor him again in 2015 with the MRSI-ICSC Super Conductivity and Materials Science Prize. The Council of Scientific and Industrial Research awarded him the Shanti Swarup Bhatnagar Prize, one of the highest Indian science awards, in 2006. He was elected as a fellow by the Indian Academy of Sciences in 2008 and he became a fellow of the Indian National Science Academy in 2015.

== See also ==
- Manapurathu Verghese George
