= M. V. George =

Indian photochemist (1928–2019)

- Born: 3 October 1928; Ashtamudi, Kollam district, Travancore, British India (present-day Kerala, India)
- Died: 9 December 2019 (aged 91); Thiruvananthapuram, Kerala, India
- Education: Madras University; Dr. Bhimrao Ambedkar University; St. John's College, Agra
- Known for: Studies on mechanism of organic reactions
- Awards: 1973 Shanti Swarup Bhatnagar Prize; 1985 C. V. Raman Award; 1990 INSA Professor T. R. Seshadri 70th Birthday Commemoration Medal; 1992 TWAS Prize; 2001 CRSI Lifetime Achievement Gold Medal
- Scientific career
- Fields: Photochemistry; Laser chemistry
- Workplaces: Indian Institute of Technology, Kanpur; National Institute for Interdisciplinary Science and Technology; University of Notre Dame
- Doctoral advisor: P. I. Ittyerah; Henry Gilman; Melvin Spencer Newman; Derek Barton; Rolf Huisgen
- Doctoral students: K. George Thomas

Manapurathu Verghese George (3 October 1928 - 9 December 2019) was an Indian photochemist and an emeritus professor of the National Institute for Interdisciplinary Science and Technology (NIIST). He was known for establishing the Photochemistry Research Unit at NIIST and his studies on the mechanism of organic reactions. He is a recipient of the 1992 TWAS Award and an elected fellow of The World Academy of Sciences, the Indian National Science Academy and the Indian Academy of Sciences. The Council of Scientific and Industrial Research, the apex agency of the Government of India for scientific research, awarded him the Shanti Swarup Bhatnagar Prize for Science and Technology, one of the highest Indian science awards, in 1973, for his contributions to chemical sciences.

== Biography ==
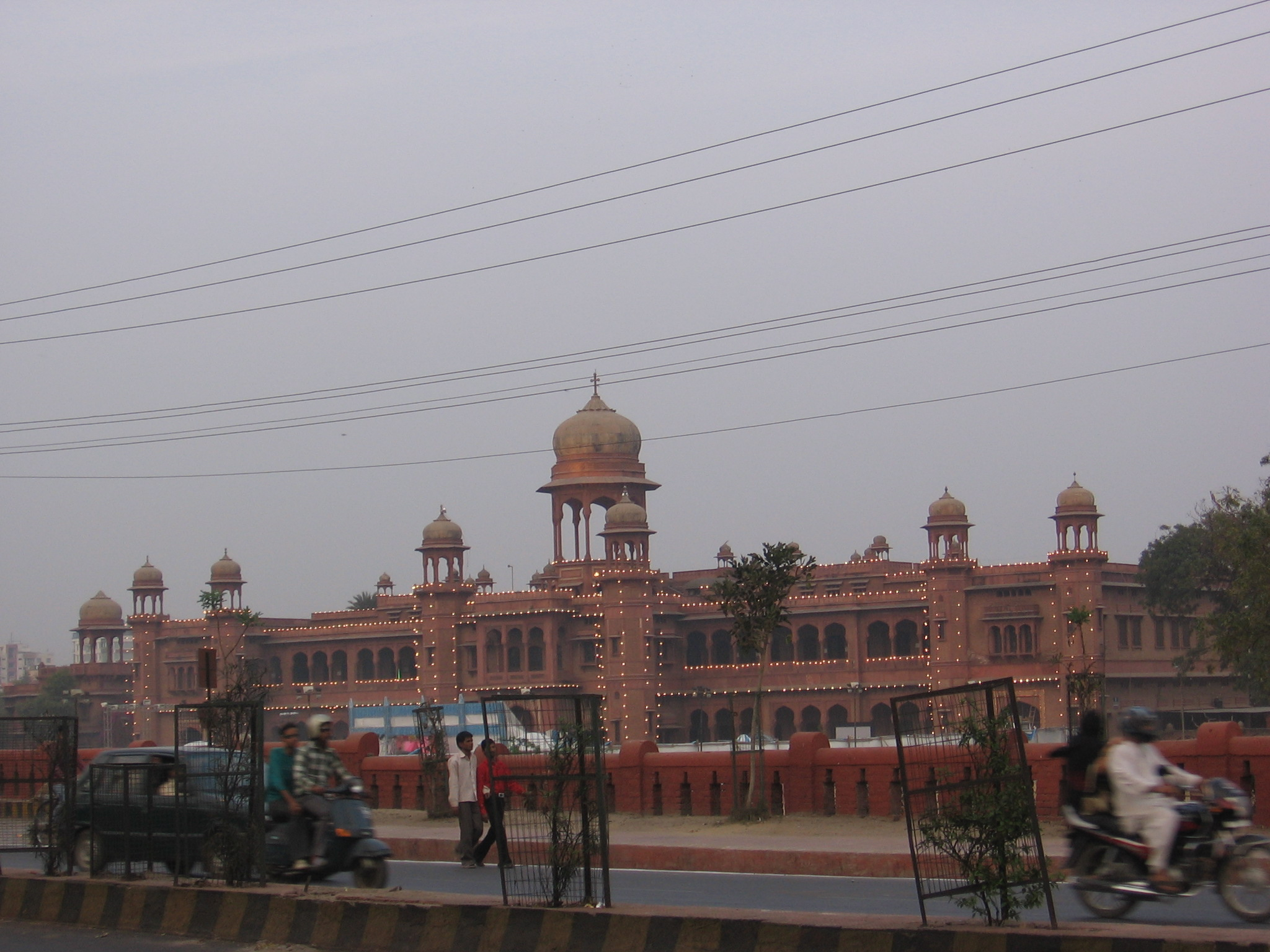
St. John's College, Agra

M. V. George, born on 3 October 1928 in the south Indian state of Kerala, graduated in chemistry from Madras University in 1948 and moved to the Dr. Bhimrao Ambedkar University (then known as Agra University) from where he secured his master's degree in 1951. He did his doctoral studies at St. John's College, Agra of Agra University under the guidance of P. I. Ittyerah, a former principal of the college, and after securing PhD in 1954, he did his post-doctoral studies at various colleges in the US, UK, Germany and Canada.

He returned to India in 1963 and started his career as a member of faculty at the Indian Institute of Technology, Kanpur. He stayed at the institution for quarter of a century until 1988 during which period he headed the Department of Chemistry from 1966 to 1969, succeeding C. N. R. Rao. Returning to his home state of Kerala in 1988, he joined the Regional Research Laboratory of the Council of Scientific and Industrial Research (present-day National Institute for Interdisciplinary Science and Technology) as an emeritus professor and served the institution until his superannuation from service. In between, he had various stints at the University of Notre Dame as a visiting professor during 1978–2001.

== Legacy ==
The main focus of George's research was centered on the mechanical implications of the thermal and photochemical organic reactions. His studies covered different areas of organometallic chemistry and he worked on electron transfer processes, organic reactions and functional group transformations. Thus he studied the organic reactions and functional group transformations, heterohexa-1, 3, 5-triene systems with regard to its electrocyclic reactions and the synthetic utility and phototransformations of dibenzobarrelenes. He also studied the picosecond laser flash photolysis techniques and the transient intermediates involved in photoreactions. He was noted for the original approach in his studies of hetero-aromatic systems.

George published his research through over 200 articles in peer-reviewed journals (Note: Please see Selected bibliography section) and guided a number of doctoral and post-doctoral scholars in their researches. He has contributed chapters to the Handbook of Chemistry and Physics, edited by C. N. R. Rao and his works have been cited by various authors in their publications. He pioneered photochemistry research at the National Institute for Interdisciplinary Science and Technology and established the Photochemistry Research Unit at the institution. He was a collaborator of C. N. R. Rao in popularizing science education at academic levels and is associated, as the executive director, with the Foundation for Capacity Building in Science (FCBS) initiative which promotes science education among Indian students through seminars and workshops. He also served as a member of the council of the Indian National Science Academy from 1989 to 1991.

== Awards and honors ==
The Indian Academy of Sciences elected George as a fellow in 1973 before he became an elected fellow of the Indian National Science Academy in 1975. The Council of Scientific and Industrial Research awarded him the Shanti Swarup Bhatnagar Prize, one of the highest Indian science awards, in 1973. He received the C. V. Raman Award in 1985 and the Professor T. R. Seshadri 70th Birthday Commemoration Medal of the Indian National Science Academy in 1990. The World Academy of Sciences awarded him the TWAS Prize in 1992 and two years later, elected him as their fellow. He is also a recipient of the Lifetime Achievement Award of the Chemical Research Society of India and a life member of the society.

== Selected bibliography ==
=== Books ===
- M. V., George (1971). Rao, C. N. R. (ed.). Handbook of Chemistry and Physics. Van Nostrand Reinhold Inc. p. 367. ISBN 978-0442068202.

=== Articles ===
- M. V. George; Abijit Mitra; Kutikat B. Sukumaran (December 1980). "Thermal and Photochemical Transformations of Hetero-1,3,5-hexatrienes into Five-Membered Rings—Possible Pericyclic Reactions". Angewandte Chemie. 19 (12): 973–983. doi:10.1002/anie.198009731.
- Suresh Das; Kakkudiyil George Thomas; Ayyappanpillai Ajayaghosh; Prashant V Kamat; B De La Barre; Manapurathu Verghese George (1992). "Photophysics and Photochemistry of Squaraine Dyes 3 Excited State Properties and Poly 4 Vinylpyridine induced Fluorescence Enhancement of Bis 2 4 6 Trihydroxyphenyl Squaraine". Journal of Physical Chemistry. 96 (25): 10327–10330. doi:10.1021/j100204a042.
- Suresh Das; J S Dileep Kumar; Kakkudiyil George Thomas; K Shivaramayya; Manapurathu Verghese George (1995). "Photocatalyzed Multiple Additions of Amines To Alpha Beta Unsaturated Esters and Nitriles Erratum To Document Cited in Ca120 298026". The Journal of Organic Chemistry. 60 (15): 4958. doi:10.1021/jo00120a054.
- Danaboyina Ramaiah; Abraham Joy; Nese Chandrasekhar; Nadukkudy V Eldho; Suresh Das; Manapurathu Verghese George (May 1997). "Halogenated Squaraine Dyes As Potential Photochemotherapeutic Agents. Synthesis And Study Of Photophysical Properties And Quantum Efficiencies Of Singlet Oxygen Generation". Photochemistry and Photobiology. 65 (5): 783–790. doi:10.1111/j.1751-1097.1997.tb01925.x. S2CID 96283947.
- Kakkudiyil George Thomas, V M Biju, Dirk M Guldi, Prashant V Kamat, Manapurathu Verghese George (1999). "Photoinduced Charge Separation and Stabilization in Clusters of A Fullerene Aniline Dyad". Journal of Physical Chemistry B. 103 (42): 8864–8869. doi:10.1021/jp9915679.
- V M Biju; Pallikkara K Sudeep; Kakkudiyil George Thomas; Manapurathu Verghese George; Said Barazzouk; Prashant V Kamat (2002). "Clusters of Bis and Tris Fullerenes". Langmuir. 18 (5): 1831–1839. doi:10.1021/la011285b.
- Manappurathu V. George (August 2003). "Contributions in organic functional group transformations and photochemical and photophysical studies of selective organic substrates". Proc. Indian Acad. Sci. 115 (4): 225–239. doi:10.1007/BF02704214.
- Cherumuttathu H Suresh; Danaboyina Ramaiah; Manapurathu Verghese George (2007). "Rearrangement of 1 3 Dipolar Cycloadducts Derived From Bis Phenylazo Stilbene A Dft Level Mechanistic investigation". Journal of Organic Chemistry. 72 (2): 367–375. doi:10.1021/jo061707s. PMID 17221951.

== See also ==
- Henry Gilman
- Melvin Spencer Newman
- Derek Barton
- Rolf Huisgen
- C. N. R. Rao
- K. George Thomas
