= John Waugh (bishop) =

English clergyman

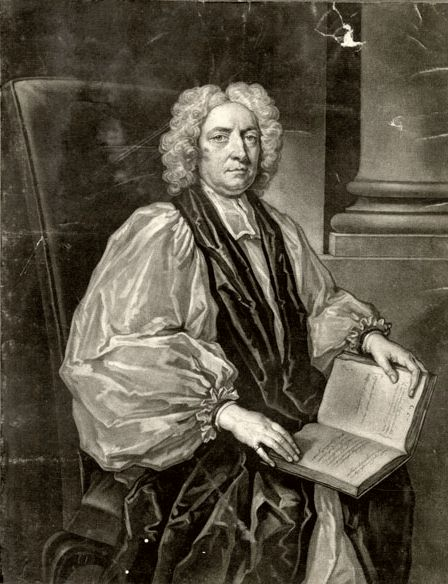
John Waugh

John Waugh (1656–1734) was an English clergyman, bishop of Carlisle from 1723.

== Life ==
He was born in Appleby, and entered The Queen's College, Oxford in 1679. He became a Fellow there in 1688, and a Proctor in 1695. He was rector of St. Peter's, Cornhill in 1704, and subsequently became a royal chaplain, canon of Lincoln in 1718, and dean of Gloucester in 1720. He was promoted as bishop of Carlisle in 1723. He died on 29 October 1734, at the London residence in Queen's Square, and was buried in St. Peter's, Cornhill.

His son John Waugh became Dean of Worcester in 1751.
