= Seth Holland =

English Roman Catholic churchman

Seth Holland (died 1561) was an English Roman Catholic churchman, Dean of Worcester and Warden of All Souls' College, Oxford under Queen Mary, but imprisoned in the Marshalsea under Elizabeth I, where he died.

== Life ==
He was educated at All Souls' College, Oxford, where he was admitted B.A. 19 December 1534, and commenced M.A. 31 March 1539. He was elected a fellow of his college, and after taking orders became rector of Fladbury, Worcestershire, and chaplain to Richard Pate, sharing in his 1542 act of attainder. Later, on leaving Rome for England in 1554, he became chaplain to Cardinal Pole.

In 1555 he was chosen Warden of All Souls' College, and on 26 April in that year he was installed as prebendary of Worcester. On 12 August 1557 he was installed Dean of Worcester in the place of Philip Hawford, the last Abbot of Evesham, and about the same time he was instituted to the rectory of Bishop Cleeve, Gloucestershire. Shortly before Mary's death, Cardinal Pole, then lying on his deathbed, sent Holland to the Princess Elizabeth, with a letter in which he dwelt on his fidelity, and begged her 'to give credit to whatever he shall say on my behalf'.

As Holland refused to comply with the religious changes introduced after Elizabeth's accession, he was removed from the wardenship of All Souls, and in October 1559 he was deprived of the deanery of Worcester. He was committed prisoner to the Marshalsea, and, dying in confinement, was buried on 6 March 1561 in St. George's parish, Southwark, brought to the church by about threescore gentlemen of the Inns of Court and Oxford.
