= George Constantine (priest) =

English Protestant priest (c. 1500–1560)

George Constantine (c. 1500 – 1560) was an English priest who was an early Protestant and evangelical reformer.

== Life ==
Constantine was, by his own account, born around 1500, and in 1523 gained entry into Cambridge University to study for a Bachelor of Canon Law. He adopted the Protestant doctrine, and fled to Antwerp where he met and assisted both William Tyndale and George Joye. Here he helped to translate the New Testament into English, and compiled books denouncing the Catholic Church. Constantine later moved to Paris, where he studied Lutheran scriptures and began to smuggle banned literature into England. He was arrested in 1531 by Sir Thomas More; after revealing the names of some of his Protestant colleagues he escaped in December of the same year, returning to Antwerp. Constantine returned to England in 1536, following More's death, and entered the service of Sir Henry Norris.

After Norris's death, Constantine was made the vicar of Llawhaden in Pembrokeshire, but some unguarded remarks to John Barlow in 1539 led to his imprisonment by Thomas Cromwell in the Tower of London. By 1546, Constantine had been released from imprisonment, and had regained favour with the church. He became the registrar of St David's in Wales, then gained the position of royal visitor of the diocese in 1547, ascending to Archdeacon of Carmarthen and Prebendary of Llangammarch in 1549. Although Constantine was stripped of his registrarship and livings during Mary's reign, he was back in favour by 1559 when he was appointed one of the visitors for the Western circuit of dioceses. At last, in November 1559, he was made archdeacon of Brecon by Elizabeth I.

Constantine married; his only surviving child became the first wife of Thomas Younge, Archbishop of York.

== Bibliography ==
- Lloyd, John Edward; Jenkins, R.T. (1958). The Dictionary of Welsh Biography Down to 1940. Cardiff: William Lewis.
