= James Stillingfleet =

James Stillingfleet may refer to:

- James Stillingfleet (priest, born 1674) (1674–1746), Dean of Worcester
- James Stillingfleet (priest, born 1741) (1741–1826), English evangelical cleric
