= Peter Marshall (Anglican priest) =

British Anglican priest (1940–2020)

Peter Jerome Marshall (1940 – 20 June 2020) was an Anglican priest.

He was born in 1940 in Buenos Aires, the son of the Rev Guy Marshall (subsequently Bishop in Venezuela) and Dorothy Whiting.

Marshall was educated at St. John's School, Leatherhead, McGill University and Westcott House, Cambridge, following which he was ordained deacon in 1963 and priest in 1964. His first posts were curacies at East Ham and Woodford. After this he was the vicar of St Peter-in-the-Forest, Walthamstow then deputy director of training for the Diocese of Chelmsford and a canon residentiary at its Cathedral. From 1985 to 1997 he was director of training and a canon residentiary for the Diocese of Ripon and Leeds. He was then appointed to the post of Dean of Worcester which he held until his retirement in 2006.

Marshall married Nancy Elliott in 1965, and they had three children. In retirement, they lived in Canada.

Church of England titles
Preceded by Bob Jeffery	Dean of Worcester; 1997–2006	Succeeded by Peter Atkinson
