= Bobby Milburn =

Robert Leslie Pollington "Bobby" Milburn FSA (28 July 1907 – 14 February 2000) was an Anglican priest in the 20th century.

== Life and career ==
Milburn was educated at Oundle School and Sidney Sussex College, Cambridge and ordained in 1935. Between then and 1957 he was a fellow, tutor and chaplain at Worcester College, Oxford. He was then appointed as the Dean of Worcester Cathedral where he served until 1968. During this time he was Librarian and Master of the Fabric and was highly knowledgeable about both. He had the crypt, originally built by St Wulstan, bishop at the time of the Norman invasion, cleaned, cleared and painted. He worked hard to maintain the fabric in good condition. He founded the Worcester Civic Society and was often seen around the city where he always preferred to walk or bicycle to travelling by car. Many local people still remember him with affection and recall that he usually wore the regular dean's uniform of breeches, gaiters and frock coat, which he always said was extremely comfortable. He was then Master of the Temple Church until his retirement in 1980, when he retired to Bromyard, Herefordshire. His wife was increasingly disabled and he looked after her with exemplary devotion, eventually moving to the Beauchamp Community in Malvern where she would be nearer the facilities she required.

Milburn was a classical scholar, but in the tradition of the Edwardian public school, applied the methods of learning to a wide range of subjects. He read and wrote excellent French and good German and knew a great deal about the natural world, particularly birds. He was much in demand as a witty after-dinner speaker, and was a natural storyteller. The late Canon Iaian Mackenzie, a canon of Worcester Cathedral and a friend of Milburn, commented when he died: "We shall not see his like again", but also pointed out that he looked forward to continuing their discussion about Clement of Alexandria in the next life and that Clement would be there to arbitrate.

== Publications ==
- Saints and their Emblems in English Churches (OUP 1949, Blackwell, 1961, reprinted Cressrells 1991)
- Early Christian Interpretations of History (Bampton Lectures 1953; A&C Black 1954)
- Early Christian Art and Architecture, Scolar Press 1988.

Church of England titles
Preceded by William Ernest Beck	Dean of Worcester; 1957 – 1968	Succeeded by Eric Waldram Kemp
