= Arthur Davies (priest) =

American-born Anglican priest

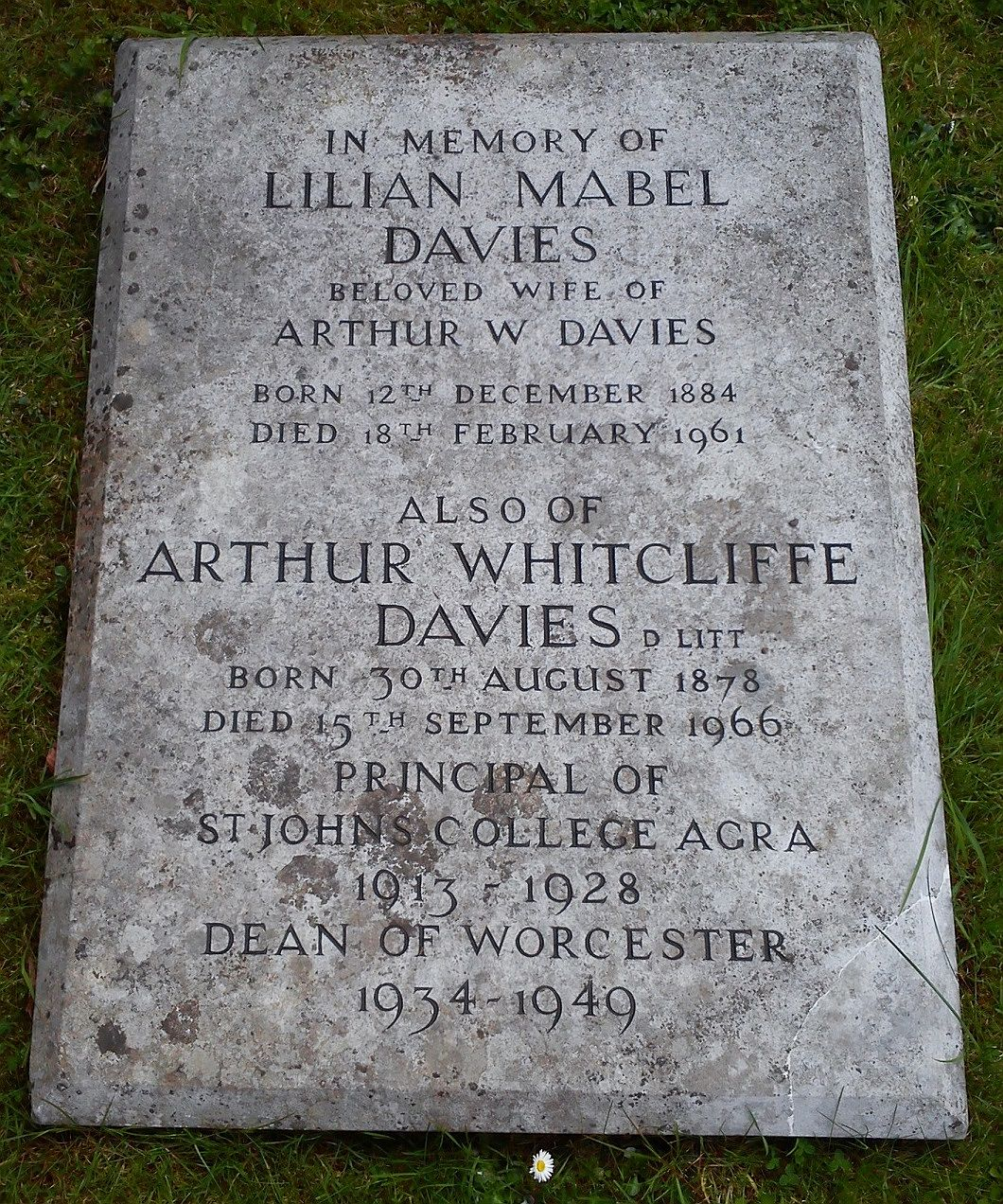
Davies' headstone at Worcester Cathedral in the Cathedral Cloisters

Arthur Whitcliffe Davies (30 August 1878 – 14 September 1966) was an American-born Anglican priest in the 20th century. He was the son of British businessman Theophilus Harris Davies, founder of Theo H. Davies & Co.

== Biography ==
Davies was born in Honolulu, where his father was a prominent businessman. He was educated at Uppingham School and University College, Oxford, and ordained in 1908. Between then and 1928 he was a lecturer and then principal of St. John's College, Agra. Returning to England he was General Secretary of the Church Assembly Missionary Council until his appointment in 1934 as Dean of Worcester, a post he held for 15 years.

In 1912, he married Lilian Mabel (née Birney; 1883–1961). They had three children: one daughter and two sons. He died on 14 September 1966 in Hertford, Hertfordshire.

Church of England titles
| Preceded by William Moore Ede | Dean of Worcester; 1934–1949 | Succeeded by William Beck |
