= Nicholas Heath =

Archbishop of York (1555–1559) and Lord Chancellor (1555–1558)

The Most Reverend Nicholas Heath
- Archbishop of York
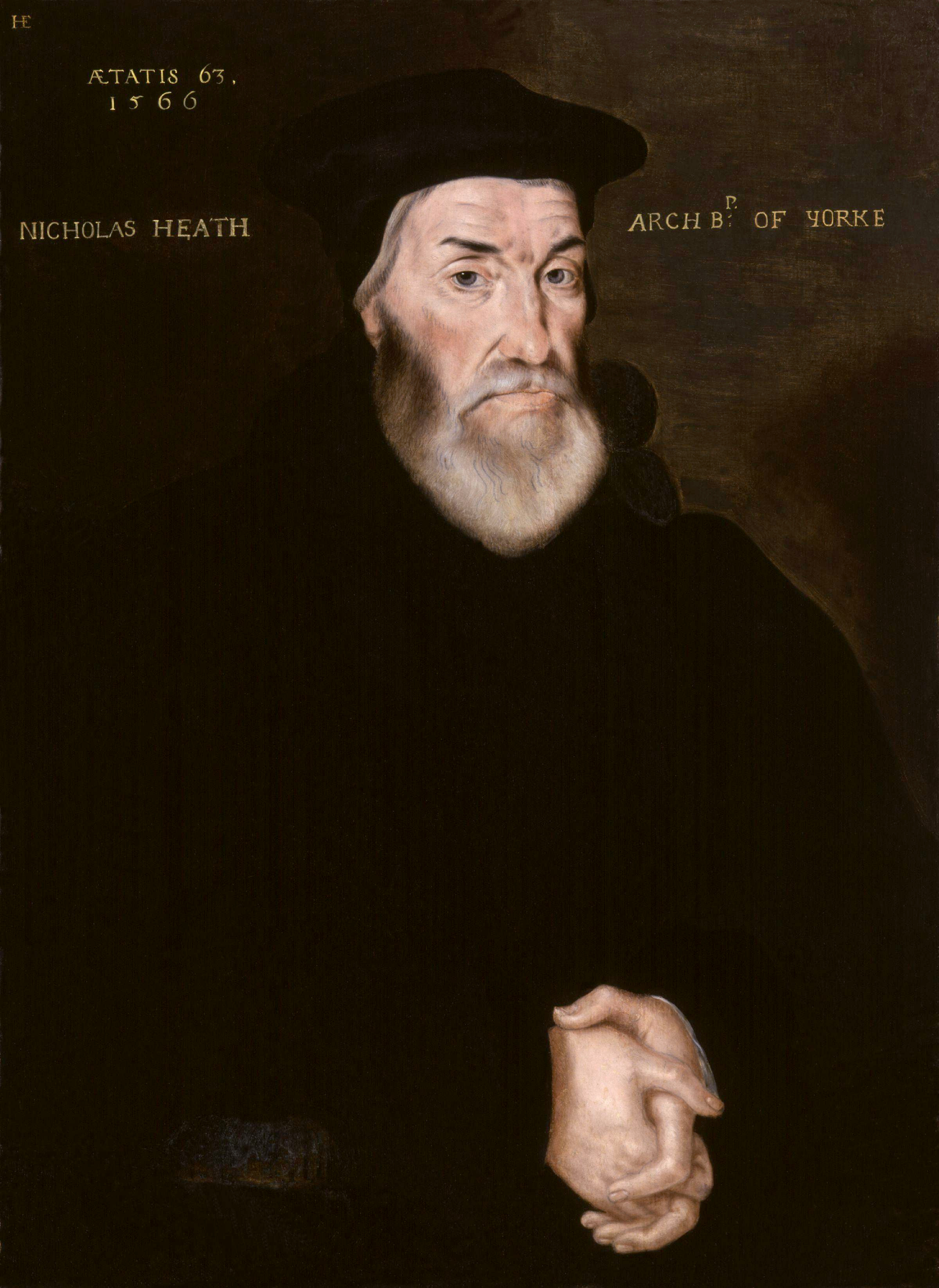
- Portrait by Hans Eworth
- Church: Roman Catholic
- Installed: 1555
- Term ended: 1559
- Predecessor: Robert Holgate
- Successor: Thomas Young

Orders
- Consecration: 4 April 1540 by Stephen Gardiner

Personal details
- Born: c. 1501 London, England
- Died: 1578 (aged 76–77) Chobham, Surrey
- Buried: Chobham, Surrey

Nicholas Heath (c. 1501–1578) was the last Roman Catholic archbishop of York and Lord Chancellor. He previously served as bishop of Worcester.

== Life ==
Heath was born in London and graduated BA at Oxford in 1519. He then migrated to Christ's College, Cambridge, where he graduated BA in 1520, MA in 1522, and was elected fellow in 1524. After holding minor preferments he was appointed archdeacon of Stafford in 1534 and graduated DD in 1535. He then accompanied Edward Fox, bishop of Hereford, on his mission to promote a theological and political understanding with the Lutheran princes of Germany. His selection for this duty implies a readiness on Heath's part to proceed some distance along the path of reform; but his dealings with the Lutherans did not confirm this tendency, and Heath's subsequent career was closely associated with adherence to Roman Catholicism.

In 1539, the year of the Six Articles, he was made bishop of Rochester, and in 1543 he succeeded John Bell at Worcester. His Catholicism, however, was arguably of a less rigid type than Gardiner's and Bonner's; he felt something of the force in some quarters of the national antipathy to foreign influence, whether ecclesiastical or secular, and was always impressed by the necessity of national unity, so far as was possible, in matters of faith. Apparently he made no difficulty about carrying out the earlier reforms of Edward VI, and he accepted the first Book of Common Prayer after it had been modified by the House of Lords in a Catholic direction.

His definite breach with the English Reformation occurred on grounds which, four centuries later, Pope Leo XIII would claim that the Anglican priesthood was not valid. The question was over the 1550 ordinal. Heath refused to accept it, was imprisoned, and in 1551 deprived of his bishopric. On Mary's accession he was released and restored, and made president of the Council of Wales and the Marches. In 1555 he was promoted to the archbishopric of York, which he did much to enrich; he built York House on the Strand, London. After Gardiner's death he was appointed lord chancellor, probably on Cardinal Reginald Pole's recommendation; for Heath, like Pole himself, disliked the Spanish party in England. Unlike Pole, however, he seems to have been averse to the harsher aspects of Mary I's reign, and no Protestants were burnt in his diocese. He exercised, however, little influence on Mary's secular or ecclesiastical policy.

On Mary's death Heath as chancellor at once proclaimed Elizabeth I. Like Sir Thomas More he held that it was entirely within the competence of the national state, represented by parliament, to determine questions of the succession to the throne; and although Elizabeth did not renew his commission as lord chancellor, he continued to sit in the privy council for two months until the government had determined to complete the breach with the Roman Catholic Church; and as late as April 1559 he assisted the government by helping to arrange the Westminster Conference, and attempting to establish some common ground between his co-religionists and the emerging Elizabethan settlement. He refused to crown Elizabeth, however, because she would not have the coronation service accompanied with the elevation of the Host; and ecclesiastical ceremonies and doctrine could not, in Heath's view, be altered or abrogated by any mere national authority.

Hence he steadily resisted Elizabeth's acts of supremacy and uniformity, although he had acquiesced in the acts of 1534 and 1549. Like others of Henry's bishops, he had been convinced by the events of Edward VI's reign that Sir Thomas More was right and Henry VIII was wrong in their attitude towards the claims of the papacy and the Roman Catholic Church. He was therefore necessarily deprived of his archbishopric in 1559, but he remained loyal to Elizabeth; and after a temporary confinement he was suffered to pass the remaining nineteen years of his life in peace and quiet, never attending public worship and sometimes hearing mass in private. The queen visited him more than once at his house at Chobham, Surrey; he died and was buried there at the end of 1578.

Political offices
Preceded by Stephen Gardiner	Lord High Chancellor of England; 1555–1558	Succeeded by Sir Nicholas Bacon as Lord Keeper of the Great Seal
Church of England titles
Preceded by John Hilsey	Bishop of Rochester; 1539–1543	Succeeded by Henry Holbeach
Preceded by John Bell	Bishop of Worcester; 1543–1551	Succeeded by John Hooper
Preceded by John Hooper	Bishop of Worcester; 1554–1555	Succeeded by Richard Pate
Preceded by 1st Earl of Pembroke	Lord President of Wales and the Marches; 1555–1558	Succeeded by 1st Earl of Pembroke
Preceded by Robert Holgate	Archbishop of York; 1555–1559	Succeeded by Thomas Young
