= St. John's College, Agra =

Indian Christian college

St. John's College
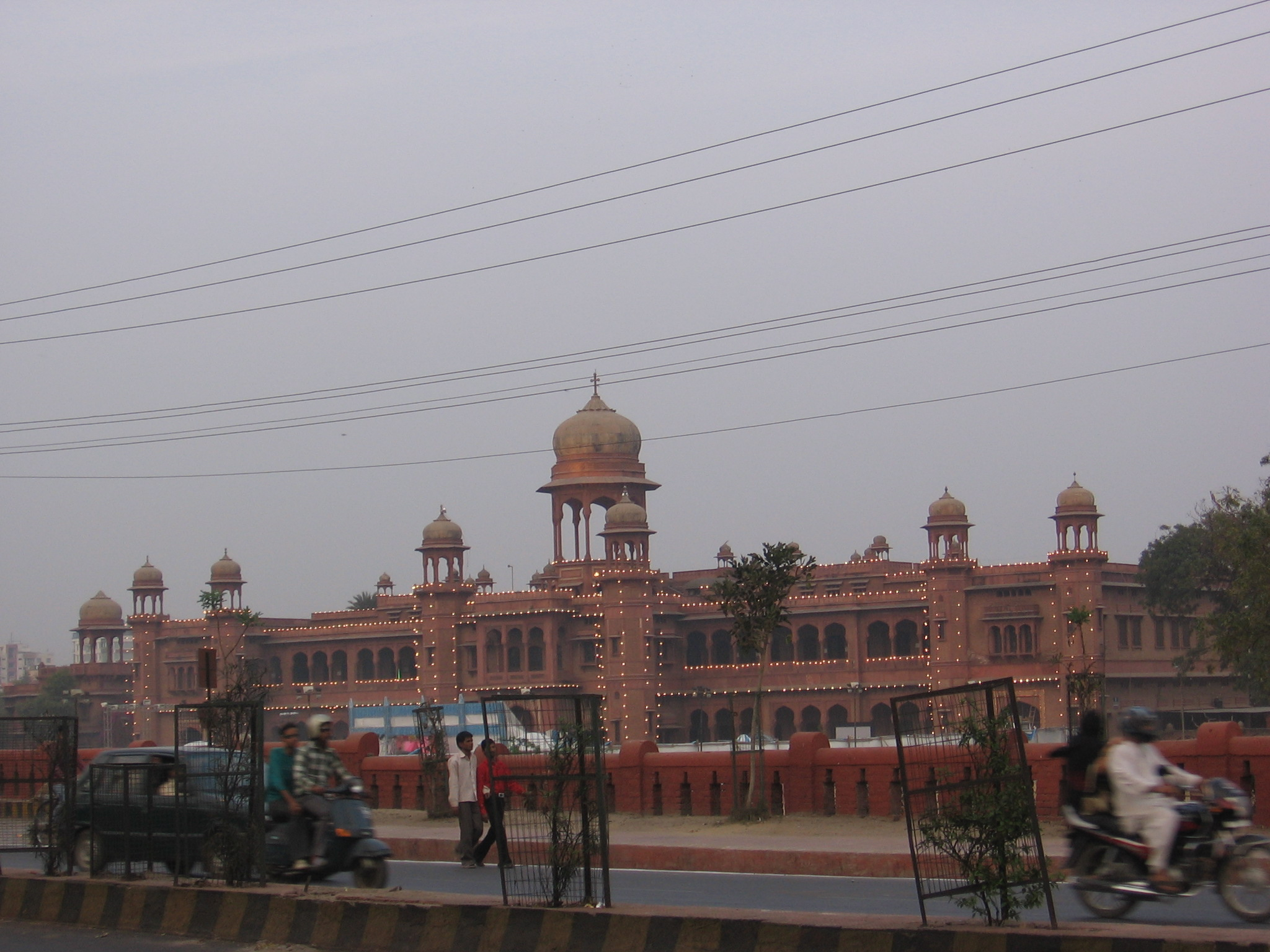
- Latin: Sancti Ioannis collegium
- Motto: The Truth Shall Make You Free
- Established: 1850; 176 years ago
- Founders: Rev. Thomas Valpy French
- Academic affiliation: Agra University
- Principal: Shailendra Pratap Singh
- Address: Mahatma Gandhi Road, Agra, Uttar Pradesh, India
- Campus: Urban
Colours
- Website: stjohnscollegeagra.in
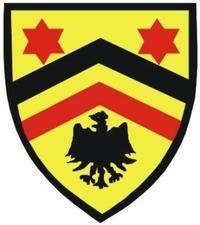

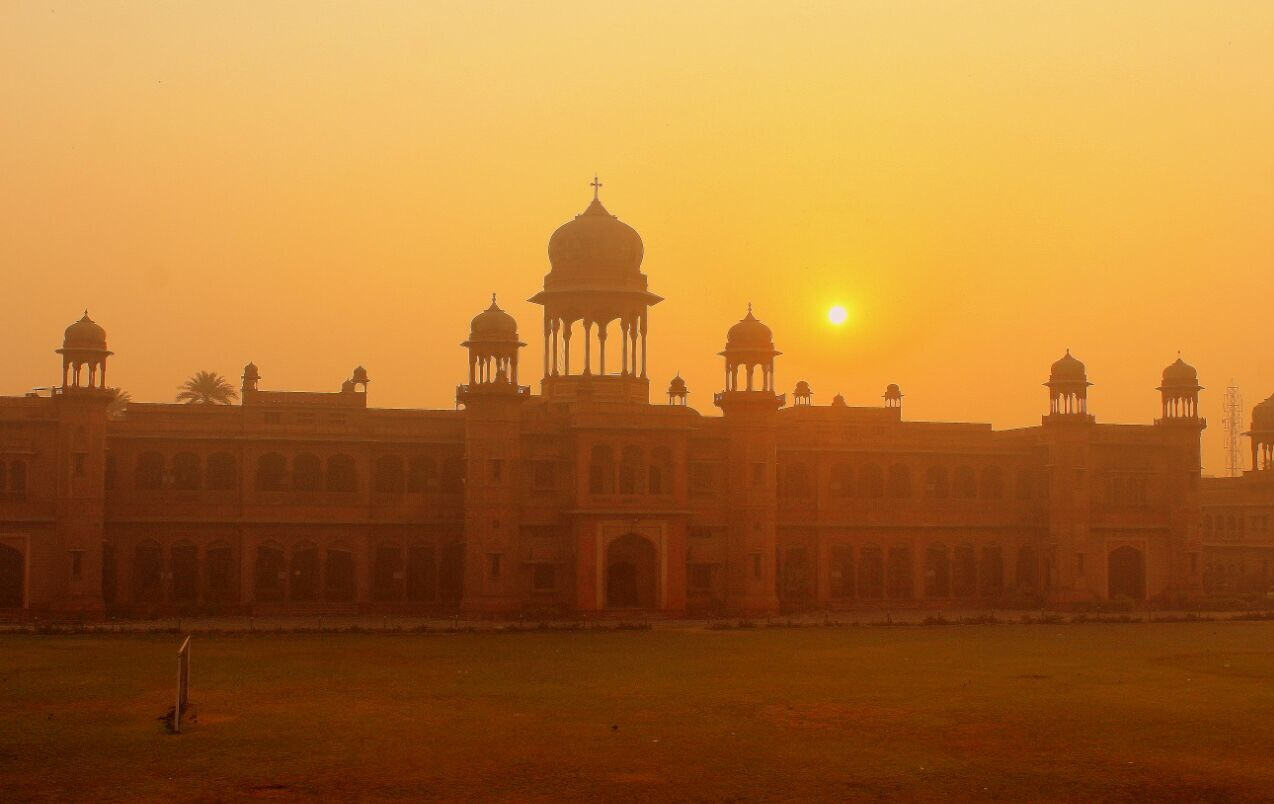

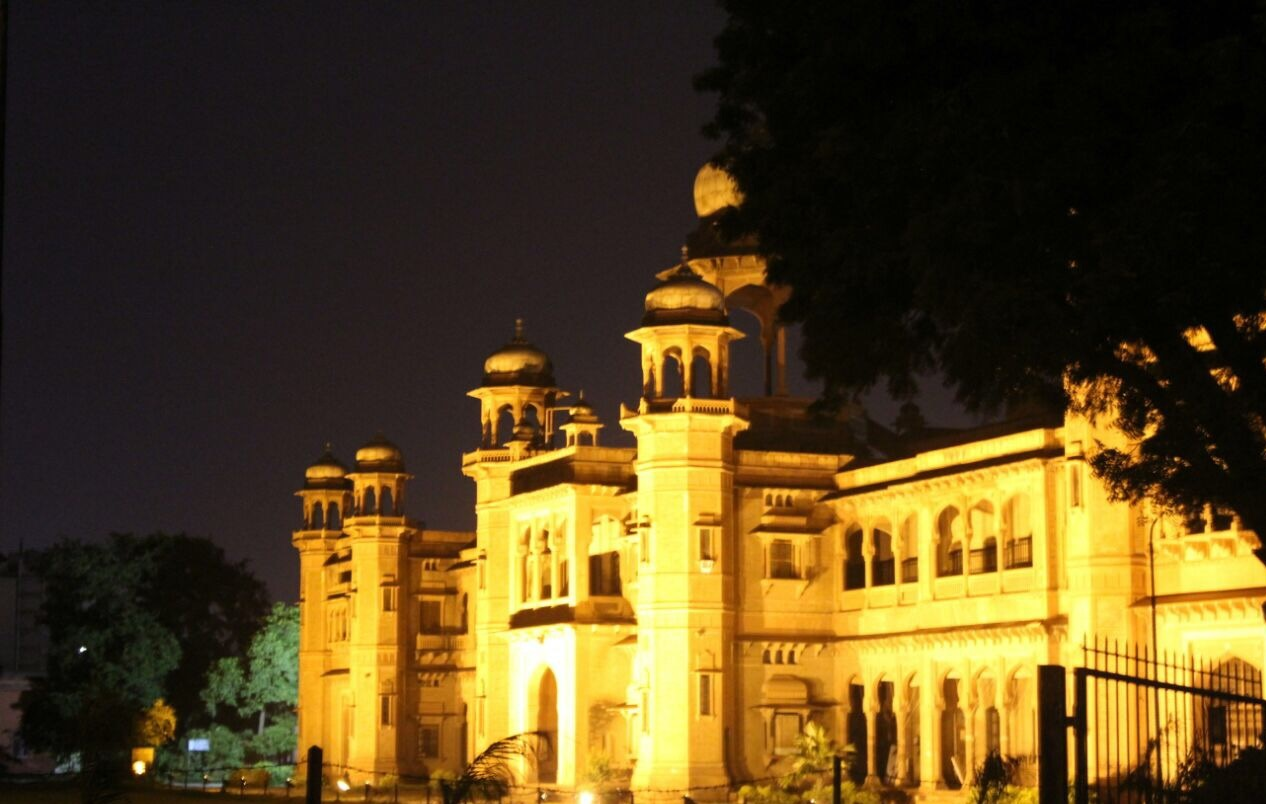
Night view

St. John's College is a constituent college of Dr. Bhimrao Ambedkar University, located in Agra. It is a Christian college under the Church of North India. It was established by the Church Mission Society to Agra. The college admits both undergraduates and postgraduates and awards degrees in liberal arts, commerce, sciences, business administration and education under the purview of Agra University. The college building features Indo-Islamic architecture.

The college was built in honor of John the Apostle, one of the Twelve apostles of Jesus.

== History ==
St. John's College, Agra, was established in 1850 by the Church Missionary Society (CMS) of England, along with Agra C.M.S. Association, and its first principal was Rev. Thomas Valpy French (1825–1891), a fellow of University College, Oxford. In 1869–70, it had 297 students, out of which 199 were Hindus, 76 Muslims, and 22 Christians.

From 1862 to 1888, the college was affiliated to the University of Calcutta. In 1912 the Church Missionary Society opened a sister school for girls in Agra and Ethel McNeile was the founding head of school. She had persuaded the CMS and the Zenana Bible and Medical Missionary Society that schools for girls in India should aspire to rival British public schools.

In 1927, St John's school that by then affiliated to the University of Allahabad moved to affiliate with Agra University (now known as Dr. Bhim Rao Ambedkar University) as it came into existence, the college became affiliated to it, and its principal Dr. A.W. Davies became the first Vice-Chancellor of the newly formed University. Since 1893, the college has offered post-graduate courses.

The college celebrated its centenary in 1952; on this occasion a new wing of the college was built. The foundation stone of the Centenary Wing was laid by Bharat Ratna Sarvapalli Radhakrishnan, former president of India in 1957 and was inaugurated by the prime minister, Jawahar Lal Nehru, on 9 October 1959.

Presently the principal of the college is Dr. Shailendra Pratap Singh.

== Present composition ==
St. John's College is a co-educational institution of higher learning with a men-women ratio of 45:55. It is regarded as a good college of Northern India. The college offers courses under five faculties – three in regular and two in self-finance mode. The college has sixteen post-graduate departments with facilities for research and three under-graduate departments. The college also runs five self-financed recognized courses: the B.Com. (vocational), B.B.A., B.Ed., M.A. (Urdu), postgraduate diploma in clinical psychology and two partially self-financed degree programmes in B.Sc. with industrial chemistry, and B.Sc. with computer science.

The college has always striven to admit students and select teachers from all communities and from all parts of India. It also admits a small number of students from overseas. The college offers scholarships and awards to meritorious students. These are endowed over a period of time.

== Campus ==
The college is situated on a large and well-known campus in Agra; on the occasion of its centenary, a new wing of the college was built. The foundation stone of the Centenary Wing was laid by Bharat Ratna Sarvapalli Radhakrishnan, former president of India, in 1957 and was inaugurated by the prime minister, Jawahar Lal Nehru, on 9 October 1959. Facilities for a number of sports are provided for on college campus. The annexe, the ladies common room, provide facilities for indoor sport and recreation. The chapel of invitation is open to all members for worship and meditation.

Residence halls

The college's halls of residence are spread across two blocks, named for former principals, as given below:

- Davis house
- Bishop French hostel

=== Library ===
The St. John's college has a central library with over 90,000 books, a reading room open access and a reference section for post-graduate and research student, most of the departments have departmental library for post-graduate students.

The college library also provides INFLIBNET facility to the faculty members, research scholars and post graduate students to consult more than 80,000 e-journals and e-books.

== Admission ==
The college has its own selection process. the college has an online application process( https://sjcportal.in ) where prospective applicants are expected to fill in their interests and academic achievements. the colleges releases a list for students selected to an interview.

== Academics ==
St. John's offers undergraduate and postgraduate degrees in:

- English
- History
- Political science
- Economics
- Psychology
- Geography
- Hindi
- Sanskrit
- Urdu
- Business administration
- Accounts and law
- Business economics
- Physics
- Chemistry
- Mathematics
- Statistics
- Zoology
- Botany.
- Education
- Computer science

St. John's offers one Ph.D. in science and commerce. Students can take vocational courses in foreign trade, advertising and sales promotion, insurance, computer science, demography, yoga psychology and mental health and communicative English. The college runs a study centre of Indira Gandhi National Open University.

== Student societies ==
Students club and societies engage in activities concerned with debating, dramatics, photography, social services, quizzing, 'dumcherade', 'antakshri' etc. many societies i.e.; BOTSO, CHEMSO, regularly invite distinguished visitors to address and join issue with students on various topical issues.

The various societies in colleges are:-

- Rovers And Rangers
- Botanical Society (BOTSO)
- Chemical Society (CHEMSO)
- Biotech Club
- Student Christian Movement Of India (SCM)
- National Service Scheme (NSS)
- National Cadet Corps Army Wing
- National Cadet Corps Air Force Wing
- Commerce Association
- Alumni Cell
- Cultural Society
- Hindi Sabha
- Arts Association
- Science Association
- Zoology Association

== Principals ==
Thomas Valpy French

- Rev. Thomas Valpy French, D.D. (first principal 1850–1859)
  - Scholar and Fellow of University College, Oxford.
  - First bishop of Lahore, United India. (1877–1887)
- Rev. Henry William Shackell, M.A. (1859–1861)
  - Student and Fellow of Pembroke College, Cambridge.
- Rev. John Barton, M.A. (1861–1863)
  - Student of Christ's College, Cambridge.
  - First principal, Cathedral Mission College, Calcutta. (1865)
  - Fellow of Madras University, Madras. (1871)
  - Vicar of Holy Trinity, Cambridge. (1876–1893)
- Rev. Charles Ellard Vines, M.A. (1863–1878)
  - Student of Trinity College, Cambridge.
  - Honours in mathematics, Trinity College, Cambridge. (1862)
- Rev. James Abbott Lloyd, M.A. (1878–1880)
  - Student of St. John's College, Cambridge.
  - Vice principal, St. John's College, Agra. (1877–1878)
  - Vicar of St. Giles's, Norwich. (1893)
- Rev. Robert John Bell, M.R.C.P (1880–1883)
  - Professor at Cathedral Mission College, Calcutta. (1874–1880)
- Rev. George Edger Augustus Pargiter, M.A. (1883–1890)
  - Student of Merton College, Oxford.
  - Fellow of Allahabad University, Allahabad. (1890)
  - Vicar of St. Paul's, Leamington. (1894)
- Rev. John Parker Haythornthwaite, M.A. (1890–1911)
  - Student of St. John's College, Cambridge.
  - Fellow of Allahabad University, Allahabad. (1894)
  - Vicar of King's Langley. (1916)
- Rev. Harry Bickersteth Durrant, M.A. (1911–1913)
  - Scholar and exhibitioner of Pembroke College, Cambridge.
  - Fellow of Allahabad University, Allahabad. (1901)
  - Vice principal, St. John's College, Agra. (1905)
  - Canon of Lucknow. (1912)
  - Bishop of Lahore, United India. (1913)
  - Fellow of Punjab University. (1913)

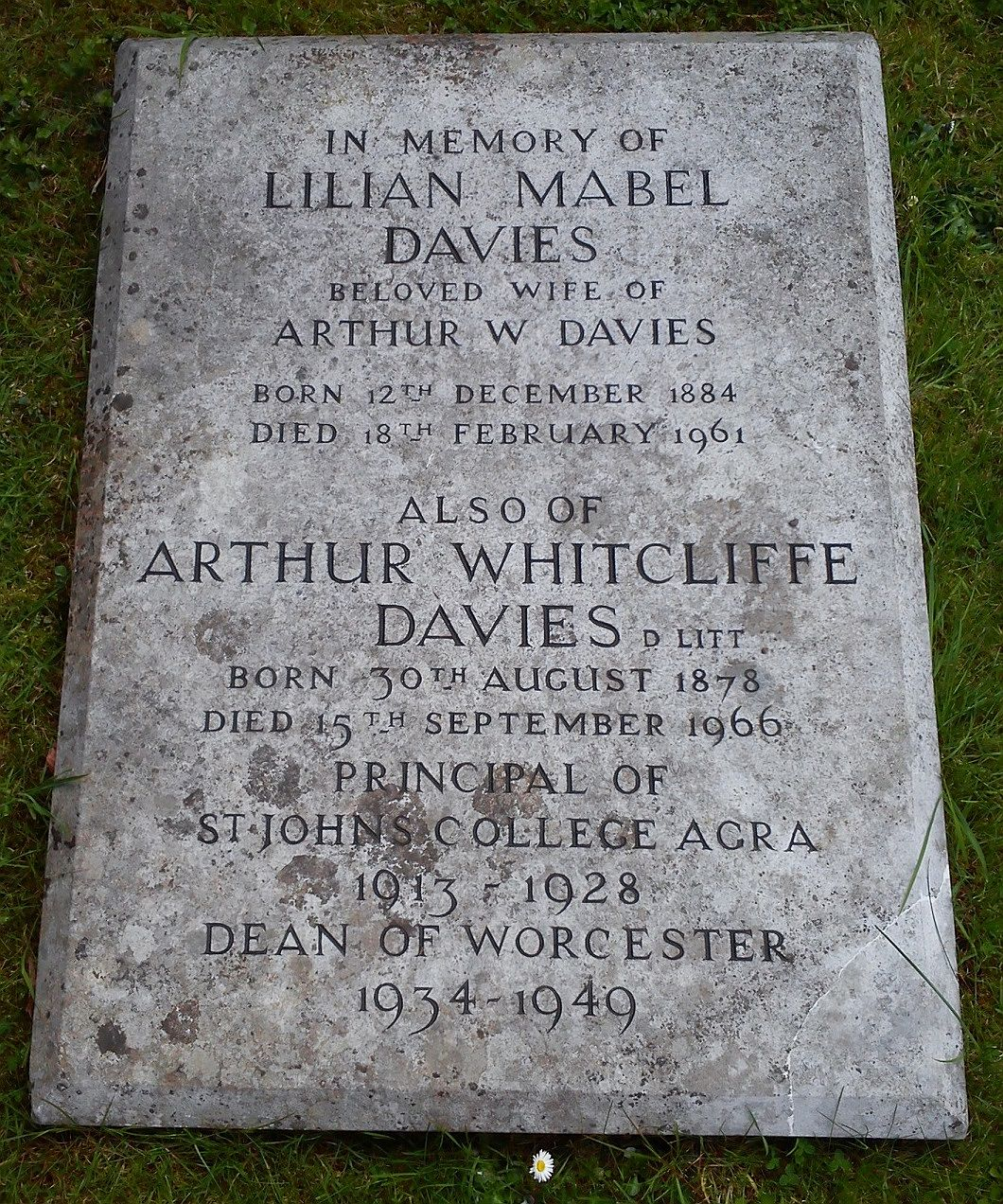
Worcester Cathedral, grave of Rev. Dr. Arthur Whitcliffe Davies in the Cathedral Cloisters

- Rev. Dr. Arthur Whitcliffe Davies, M.A., D.Litt. (1913–1928)
  - Scholar of Uppingham and University College, Oxford. (1902)
  - Scholar of Wycliffe Hall, Oxford. (1904)
  - Vice principal, St. John's College, Agra. (1911)
  - Canon of Lucknow. (1917)
  - Kaiser-i-Hind Medal. (1921)
  - First vice chancellor of Agra University. (1927)
  - Hon. Canon of Bradford. (1930)
- William Edward Sladen Holland, M.A. (1929–1933)
  - Student of Magdalen College, Oxford.
  - Founded Oxford and Cambridge Hostel (now Holland Hall, Allahabad)
  - Fellow of Allahabad University, Allahabad. (1906)
  - Principal, St. Paul's College, Calcutta. (1913)
  - Fellow of Calcutta University, Calcutta. (1916)
  - Canon of Lucknow. (1931)
- Rev. Canon Thomas Donald Sully, M.A. (1933–1948)
  - Scholar of Wadham College, Oxford.
- C.V. Mahajan, B.A. (1948–1954)
  - Scholar of Keble College, Oxford.
- Dr. P. Thomas Chandi (1954–1968)
  - Conferred 'Padam Shree' by the Government of India. (1965)
  - Vice chancellor of Gorakhpur University. (1968)
- Dr. P.I. Ittyerah (1968–1978)
- Dr. S.C. Banwar (1978–1979)
  - Pro vice chancellor of North Eastern Hill University, Shillong. (1979)
- Gladwin M. Ram, A.M. (1979–1991)
  - Scholar of Harvard University, Massachusetts.
- Dr. M.S. Renick, P.hD. (1991–1996)
- Dr. Ipe Michael Ipe, P.hD. (1996–1999)
- Dr. Fazal Masih Prasad, M.Sc. (Ag. Chem)., D.Phil., D.Sc., F.B.R.S., F.I.S.A.C., F.I.S.A.B., F.I.C.C., F.S.P.P.S., M.N.A.Sc. (1999–2011)
  - Scholar of Agra and Allahabad Universities.
  - Member, board of governors, Ewing Christian College, Allahabad.
  - Member, board of governors, St. Andrew's College, Gorakhpur.
  - Member, board of governors, Sherwood College, Nainital.
  - Member, board of governors, All Saints' College, Nainital.
  - Manager, St. John's Inter College, Agra.
  - Fellow of Plant Protection Science.
  - Fellow and Life Member of Indian Council of Chemists
  - Conferred Dr. Sam Higginbottom Award for the Best Principal for the year 2004–2005.
  - Member of Board of Studies in Chemistry, Dairy Chemistry, Engineering Chemistry and Home Science. (1984–1999)
  - Member of Board of Studies in Agricultural Chemistry, Mahatma Jyotiba Phule Rohilkhand University, Bareilly.
  - Member of editorial board of The New Agriculturist.
  - Member of executive committee of Indian Society of Agricultural Chemists.
  - Technical editor of The Allahabad Farmer
  - Conferred Rev. Fr. T.A. Mithias National Award for the Innovative College Educators for the year 2002.
  - Fellow of Indian Society of Agri-Bio Chemists.
  - Conferred The Jewel of India Award. (2001)
  - Conferred Vidya Ratan Award. (2001)
  - Fellow of Indian Society of Agricultural Chemists.
  - Fellow of Bioved Research Society.
  - Acting principal, Allahabad Agricultural Institute. (1992–1993)
  - Head of the Department of Chemistry, Allahabad Agricultural Institute. (1996–1999)
  - Dean (students' welfare), Allahabad Agricultural Institute.
  - Proctor, Allahabad Agricultural Institute.
- Prof. Alexender Lall (2011–2015)
- Prof. Peter Edward Joseph, D.Phil., F.I.C.C. (2015 – 30 June 2019)
- Dr. Shailendra Pratap Singh (11 July 2019 –)

== Notable alumni ==
St. John's College Agra has produced many distinguished personalities, including one President of India, two Governor of states, one nominee for the Nobel Prize, Indian ambassador to United States of America and many IAS, IFS and IRS officers.

- Shankar Dayal Sharma, former President of India.
- Pankaj Pachauri, journalist, managing editor of NDTV
- Meera Shankar, IFS, Indian ambassador to the United States
- Babu Gulabrai, Hindi writer and philosopher
- Khurshed Alam Khan, former governor of Karnataka
- Shilendra Kumar Singh, former foreign secretary and governor of Rajasthan
- Laxmi Raman Acharya, freedom fighter and former deputy chief minister, Uttar Pradesh
- Rangeya Raghav (1923–1962), Hindi writer.
- Raj Narain, IRS (Retd.), former member/spl. secretary, Central Board of Direct Taxes.
- Asrar ul Haq Majaz, eminent Urdu poet.
- Manapurathu Verghese George, photo chemist, Shanti Swarup Bhatnagar laureate.
- Rakesh Asthana, former Police Commissioner of Delhi and former special director of CBI.
- Vipul Mudgal, journalist, academic and activist.

=== Notable presidents ===
- Cyril Charles (1980)
- Samuel Charles (1952)
