= Rangeya Raghav =

Rangeya Raghava (रांगेय राघव) (17 January 1923 – 12 September 1962) was an Indian writer.

== Early life ==
His birth name Tirumalai Nambakam Vir Raghava Acharya. He was born in Agra, a city of Uttar Pradesh state, India, and lived in Weir village of Bharatpur. A prominent Hindi writer of the 20th century, he completed his post-graduation studies from St. John's College, Agra, and later completed his Ph.D. on Guru Gorakhnath and his times. He started writing at the age of 13 years, and during his short life of 39 years, he was endowed with a number of prizes. His wife Sulochana Rangeya Raghava lives in Jaipur and has been an Associate Professor of Sociology in the University Of Rajasthan. There is an Inter College in Ambedkar Nagar District named Rangey Raghav Inter College after him.

One of his famous novels Kab tak pukaroon (How Long Do I Call) was made into a television series for Doordarshan. It was directed by late Sudhanshu Mishra and produced by Sudhir Mishra. It dealt with the conflicts between two social groups of India, the nomadic community of Nats (like Romani of Europe) and the Thakurs - both groups placed at different hierarchical social levels in the Indian traditional society of yesteryears. His other novel, Murdon Ka Teela (The Mound of The Dead), published in 1948, is the story of the Indus Valley Civilization, and incorporates many archaeological discoveries.

He translated 15 plays of William Shakespeare between 1957–58.

== Major works ==
=== Novels ===
- Gharaunda (1946)
- Murdon Ka Teela (1948)
- Kab Tak Pukaarun (1957)
- Dharti Mera Ghar (1961)
- Akhiri Awas (1962)
- Cheevar (1951)
- Andhere Ke Jugnu(1953)
- Yashodhara Jeet Gai(1958)
- Maha Yatra Gatha(1960)
- Rah Na Ruki(1958)
- Kaka
- Ratna Ki Baat
- Loyi Ka Taanaa
- Devaki Ka Beta
- Rai Aur Parwat
- Visaad Matth
- Pakshi Aur Aakash

=== Collection of stories ===
- Devadaasee
- Samrajya Ka Vaibhav
- Jeevan Ke Daane
- Angaare Na Bujhe
- Samudra Ke Fen
- Pancnh Parmeshwar
- Nayee Jindagi Ke Liye

=== Others ===
- Toofaanon Ke Beech (1944)
- Medhavi (1947)
- Pragatisheel Sahitya Ke Mandand
- Sangam Aur Sangharsh
- Pracheen Bhartiya Paramparaa Aur Itihaas

=== Plays ===
- Ramanuj
- Viruddhak
- Swargabhumi Ka Yatri (1949–53)
- Aakhiree Dhava
- Hatim Mar gayaa.
