= Peter Atkinson (priest) =

Anglican dean

Peter Gordon Atkinson (born 26 August 1952) is a British retired Anglican priest. He served as Dean of Worcester from 2007 to 2023.

== Biography ==
He was born on 26 August 1952. He studied at St John's College, Oxford, graduating with a Bachelor of Arts (BA) degree in 1974: in accordance with tradition, his BA was promoted to a Master of Arts (MA Oxon) degree in 1978. He trained for ordination at Westcott House, Cambridge, a liberal Anglo-Catholic theological college.

Atkinson was ordained in the Church of England as a deacon in 1979 and as a priest in 1980. His first post was a curacy in Clapham after which he was priest-in-charge of St Mary, Tatsfield. He was then rector of Holy Trinity, Bath, last principal of Chichester Theological College, and rector of Lavant. After this he was a canon residentiary at Chichester Cathedral before his decanal appointment. On 18 November 2014 he was awarded an Honorary Doctorate of Letters by the University of Worcester. He retired effective 25 August 2023.

Church of England titles
Preceded by Peter Marshall	Dean of Worcester; 2007–2023	Succeeded by Stephen Edwards
