= William Beck (Dean of Worcester) =

William Ernest Beck (4 October 1884 – 22 May 1957) was an Anglican priest in the 20th century.

He was born in Clapton, London, to William James Beck, a commercial clerk, and Rosetta Thorpe Beck. He was educated at Great Yarmouth Grammar School and Durham University. He was ordained in 1908. From then to 1915, he was a tutor then vice-principal at St Aidan's Theological College, Birkenhead. After this, he was Vicar of St Anne's Birkenhead before 28 years as the principal of St Paul's Training College, Cheltenham. In 1949, he was appointed Dean of Worcester, a position he held until his death eight years later.

Church of England titles
Preceded by Arthur Davies	Dean of Worcester; 1949–1957	Succeeded by Bobby Milburn
