= Ethel McNeile =

British missionary and headmistress

- Born: 18 October 1875; London
- Died: 20 May 1922 (aged 46); Ushant
- Education: Girton College, Cambridge
- Occupation: missionary
- Employer: Church Missionary Society
- Known for: Theosophist turned missionary and headmistress who died for others

Ethel Rhoda McNeile (18 October 1875 – 20 May 1922) was a British missionary and headmistress.

== Life ==
McNeile was born in London in 1875. Her parents were Mary Rosa Lush and the Reverend Hector M‘Neile (1843–1922), a fellow of St John's College, Cambridge (1865–1871), the vicar of Bredbury, Cheshire, a missionary of the Church Missionary Society in Bombay and vicar of Bishop's Sutton, Hampshire (1907–1922). Three of her siblings, the Reverend Robert Fergus M‘Neile, Annie Hilda M‘Neile and Jessie Margaret M‘Neile, served as missionaries in Egypt and Palestine also for the Church Missionary Society.

She attended The Queen's School in Chester and then Westfield College in London. She resisted the family's interest in serving as missionaries and was a de facto feminist. She studied maths at Victoria University of Manchester for two years before joining Girton College, Cambridge. She was a member of the Theosophical Society serving as secretary to the Manchester branch for four years. She graduated but she was not given a degree because she was not male.

In India she met Annie Besant and she moved closer to Theosophy. She later had long discussions with CMS missionary William Edward Sladen Holland, who would write "The Goal of India" in 1920 persuaded her to rejoin Christianity. McNeile's writing about her conversion from Theosophy was later described as an "exposure" by the CMS. She went back to England to train and in 1907 she was approved by the Church Missionary Society. She could speak Urdu and Hindi and she studied Sanskrit.

McNeile wrote and published her ideas for the education of girls in India. In 1912 the Church Missionary Society opened a sister school to St. John's College, Agra for girls in Agra and McNeile was the founding head of school. She had persuaded the CMS and the Zenana Bible and Medical Missionary Society that schools for girls in India should aspire to rival British public schools. It was difficult to find recruits and she would hold "purdah" parties where she could persuade mothers that their daughters should be educated.

Ten years later in 1922 McNeile was returning en route to Bombay on the British P & O steamer S.S. Egypt. On the evening of 20 May, near the French island of Ushant, off the coast of Brittany, in a heavy sea fog, her ship with 38 passengers and 290 crew, was rammed. It was 7:30PM, and many of the passengers were still on deck, the dinner gong having just sounded, when the ship was sliced in two, and sunk by the French cargo steamer Seine. Ninety-eight people died and 230 were saved. One report said that there were more than enough lifeboats for all to safely leave the ship, but the majority of the crew had taken to the lifeboats immediately. This meant that there was not enough lifeboat-launching manpower left on deck. McNeile refused to enter a lifeboat because of the lack of capacity, giving her seat to a woman whose children would have been orphaned and, kneeling on the deck in prayer, she went down with the ship; she was one of the 10 passengers and 88 crew who perished. A memorial to her is on her father's grave in the churchyard of St Nicholas' Church, Bishop's Sutton.
