= John Waugh (priest) =

John Waugh (died 19 April 1765) was Dean of Worcester from 1751 until his death.

Waugh was born in the parish of St Bride's Church, London, the son of John Waugh (later Dean of Gloucester and Bishop of Carlisle). He was educated at The Queen's College, Oxford, matriculating in 1722, graduating B.A. 1724, M.A. 1727, D.C.L. 1735 (incorporated LL.D. at Cambridge in 1749).

He was Vicar of Stanwix, Cumberland, from 1727 to 1765; Prebendary and Chancellor of Carlisle Cathedral from 1727 until 1751; and Vicar of Bromsgrove tith the Mastership of St Oswald's Hospital, Worcester, from 1754.

Church of England titles
Preceded by Edmund Marten	Dean of Worcester; 1751–1765	Succeeded by Sir Richard Wrottesley, Bt
