= Edmund Marten =

British priest

Edmund Marten (31 March 1688 – 8 October 1751) was Dean of Worcester from 1746 until his death in 1751.

Marten was the son of John Marten of Lavington, Wiltshire. He was educated at Winchester College, where he gained a scholarship in 1698, and New College, Oxford, where he matriculated in 1706, graduating BCL 1713, DCL 1718.

In the church, he held the following positions:

- Rector of Somerton, Oxfordshire, 1713–19
- Rector of Angmering, Sussex, 1719
- Rector of Woolbeding, Sussex, 1732
- Morning preacher at Grosvenor Chapel, London, 1731
- Canon of St George's Chapel, Windsor Castle, 1733–51
- Prebendary of St Paul's Cathedral, London, 1730–51
- Vicar of Twickenham, Middlesex, 1741–9
- Dean of Worcester and Master of St. Oswald's Hospital, Worcester, 1746–51

On 23 February 1734/5, Marten married Jane Hawkins.

Church of England titles
| Preceded by James Stillingfleet | Dean of Worcester; 1746–1751 | Succeeded by John Waugh |
