= Henry Morgan (bishop) =

British bishop (died 1559)

The Right Reverend Henry Morgan
- Bishop of St Davids
- Church: Roman Catholic
- Appointed: 1554
- Term ended: 1559
- Predecessor: Robert Ferrar
- Successor: Thomas Young

Orders
- Consecration: 1 April 1554 by Edmund Bonner

Personal details
- Born: Dewisland, Pembrokeshire
- Died: 23 December 1559 Wolvercote

Henry Morgan (died 23 December 1559) was a Welsh lawyer and churchman, Bishop of St Davids during the reign of Mary I of England.

== Life ==
He was born in Dewisland, Pembrokeshire, and became a student in the University of Oxford in 1515. He proceeded B.C.L. 10 July 1522, and D.C.L. 17 July 1525, and soon after became principal of St. Edward's Hall, which was then a hostel for civilians. He was admitted at Doctors' Commons 27 October 1528, and for several years acted as moderator of those who performed exercises for their degrees in civil law at Oxford.

Taking holy orders, he obtained rapid preferment. He became rector of Walwyn's Castle, Pembrokeshire, 12 February 1530; prebendary of St Margaret's, Leicester 1536; canon of Bristol, 4 June 1542; prebendary of the collegiate church St Carantoc's Church, Crantock in Cornwall, 1547; canon of Exeter, 1548; rector of Mawgan, Cornwall, 1549, and of St. Columb Major, Cornwall, 1550.

On the deprivation of Robert Ferrar he was appointed by Queen Mary bishop of St. David's in 1554. He held the see until he was deprived of it, on the accession of Elizabeth I, about midsummer 1559. He then retired to Wolvercote, near Oxford, where some relatives, including the Owens of Godstow House, resided. He died at Wolvercote on 23 December 1559, and was buried in the church there. John Foxe in his Acts and Monuments of the Church and Thomas Beard in his Theatre of God's Judgments state that Morgan was 'stricken by God's hand' with a malady; Foxe gives some gruesome details; but Anthony à Wood could find no tradition to that effect among the inhabitants of Wolvercote.

== Notes ==
Catholic Church titles
Preceded by Robert Ferrar	Bishop of St David's; 1554–1559	Succeeded by Thomas Young
