= Richard Pate (bishop) =

English Roman Catholic bishop

The Right Reverend Richard Pates
- Bishop of Worcester
- Church: Roman Catholic
- Diocese: Worcester
- Appointed: 8 July 1541
- In office: 1541–1559
- Predecessor: Girolamo Ghinucci
- Successor: Edwin Sandys

Personal details
- Born: Oxfordshire, England
- Died: 1565 Leuven

Richard Pate (Pates, Patys) (died 1565) was an English Roman Catholic bishop.

== Life ==
Born in Oxfordshire, he was a nephew of John Longland. He graduated B.A. from Corpus Christi College, Oxford, in 1523. He studied under Juan Luis Vives, at Bruges.

He graduated M.A. in Paris, and was made Archdeacon of Winchester in 1527 and Archdeacon of Lincoln in 1528. He was appointed ambassador to the Emperor Charles V, in 1533. In 1537 he was removed from that position, after he had advocated for the legitimate status of Princess Mary; but he was reinstated in 1540.

He ignored a summons home in late 1540, after letters to him from John Heliar were discovered. Instead, he stayed with the Emperor, travelling to Germany and then Rome. From the Catholic point of view, he became Bishop of Worcester when appointed to the see by Pope Paul III in 1541, on the death of Girolamo Ghinucci, still recognized as the bishop. With Seth Holland, his chaplain, he was the subject of an act of attainder, in 1542.

He attended the sessions of the Council of Trent in 1547, 1549, and 1551. He remained in exile until the accession of Mary I. He was then consecrated as bishop, in 1554, his attainder having been lifted. In the will of Sir Robert Acton dated 24 September 1558 he is named as one of the Executors, despite the fact that Sir Robert expressed himself in terms consistent with his dying in the Protestant faith. In 1559, after the accession of Elizabeth I of England, he was deprived, and then imprisoned in the Tower of London. He died at Leuven, once more in exile.

== Notes ==
Catholic Church titles
Preceded by Girolamo Ghinucci	Bishop of Worcester (unrecognized by Crown); 1541–1554	Succeeded by Nicholas Heath (recognized by both Crown and Vatican)
Church of England titles
Preceded by Nicholas Heath	Bishop of Worcester; 1555–1559	Succeeded by Edwin Sandys
