= Stephen Edwards (priest) =

British Anglican priest

The Very Reverend Dr Stephen Edwards
- Dean of Worcester
- Church: Church of England
- Diocese: Worcester
- In office: September 2024 – present
- Predecessor: Peter Atkinson

Orders
- Ordination: 1996 (deacon); 1997 (priest)

Personal details
- Born: Stephen Michael Edwards; 5 July 1972 (age 54)
- Denomination: Anglicanism
- Education: Lancaster University; Westcott House, Cambridge; Anglia Ruskin University; University of Manchester

Stephen Michael Edwards (born 5 July 1972) is a British Anglican priest. Since 2024, he has served as Dean of Worcester.

== Life and career ==
Edwards was born on 5 July 1972 in Shrewsbury. He attended Darland High School and Yale College, Wrexham. He was educated at Lancaster University and Anglia Ruskin University, and trained at Westcott House, Cambridge. He served as a curate in the parish of Colwyn Bay in the Diocese of St Asaph, and was ordained priest in 1997. In 1999, he became Priest-in-Charge of Bryn-y-Maen. In 2002, he became Priest-in-Charge at St Agnes' Church, Longsight, in the Diocese of Manchester. (Note: In full, he was Priest-in-Charge of St Agnes, Birch-in-Rusholme, with St John with St Cyprian Longsight, but the churches of St John and St Cyprian have long been closed.) In 2012, he became Team Rector of Wythenshawe, additionally becoming Area Dean of Withington in 2013.

In 2016 he obtained the degree of Doctor of Practical Theology at the University of Manchester. His thesis, titled "A Critical Exploration of the Ministry of a White Priest within a Black-Majority Congregation", reflects on his ministry at St Agnes', Longsight.

In 2019, he was appointed Residentiary Canon at Worcester Cathedral, becoming Vice-Dean in 2021, and was appointed interim Dean of Worcester on the retirement of Peter Atkinson in 2023. His permanent appointment as Dean was then announced on 17 June 2024. He was installed as Dean on 15 September.

== Notes ==
Church of England titles
Preceded by Peter Atkinson	Dean of Worcester; 2024–	incumbent
