= Philip Hawford =

Philip Hawford alias Ballard (died 11 August 1557) was the parish priest (c.1536 – 1557) at Elmley Lovett, Worcestershire. He was also the last Abbot of Evesham and also Dean of Worcester.

== Life ==
Philip Hawford became Abbot of Evesham Abbey by preferment. He was in negotiations with Thomas Cromwell in 1536 telling Cromwell that he would 'Gladly accomplish' all the promises he had made and be always ready for "the call to preferment" promised him by Cromwell. Philip Hawford was called to preferment on 4 April 1538. Evidently he had bribed Cromwell for his preferment, for in May 1538 William Petre wrote to Thomas Wriothesley that 'touching Mr Cromwell's matter the abbot says it shall be paid to-morrow morning'. And an entry of 400 marks from the abbot is found in Cromwell's account for that month. Hence Philip Hawford became the last abbot of Evesham and effectively 'gave' King Henry VIII the Abbey of Evesham which was destroyed shortly after.

He was at some point the cellarer at Evesham Abbey before the Dissolution of the Monasteries.
