= Dean of Worcester =

Head of the Chapter of Worcester Cathedral in England

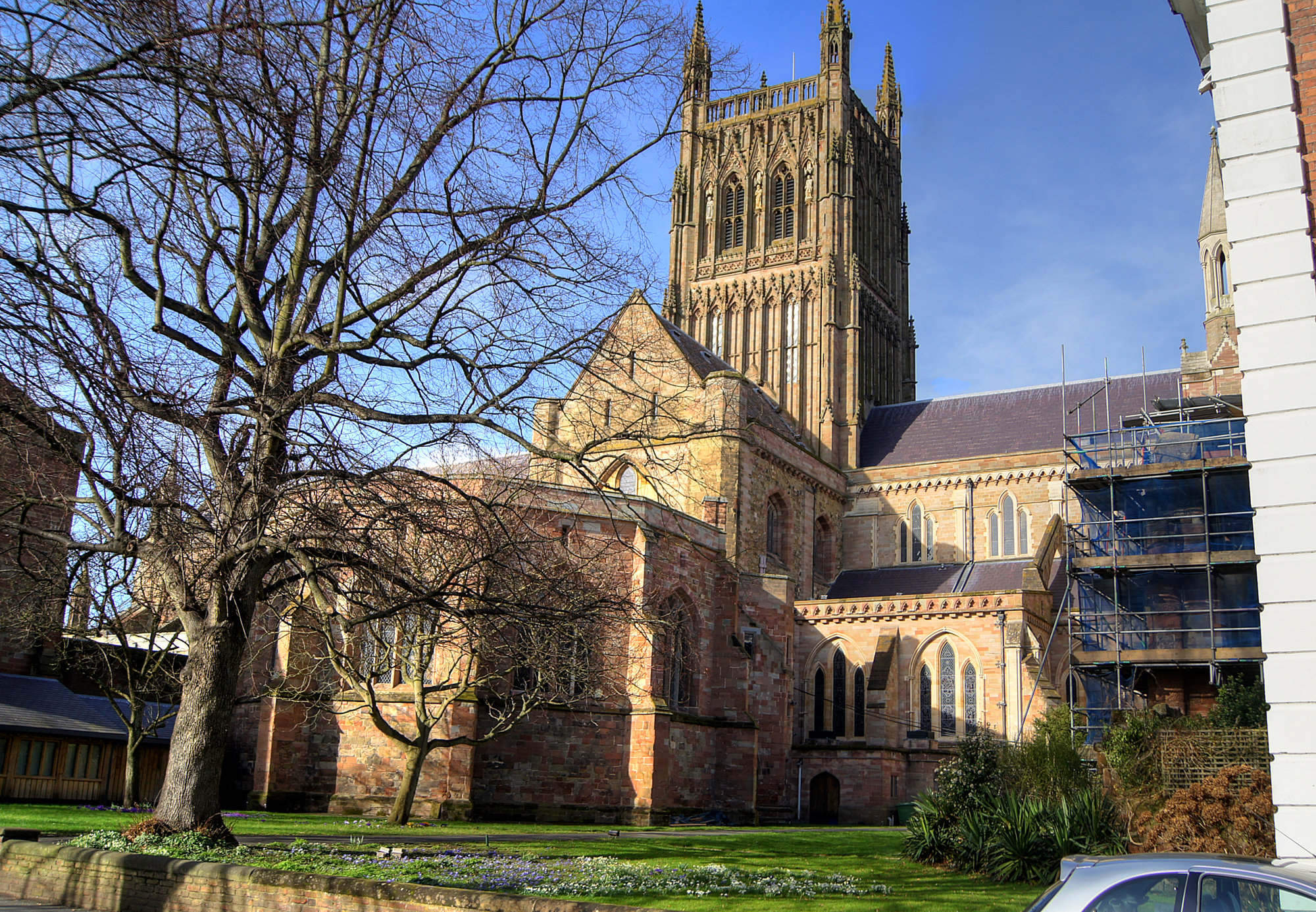
Worcester Cathedral

The Dean of Worcester is the head of the Chapter of Worcester Cathedral in Worcester, England. The current dean is Stephen Edwards. The dean lives at The Deanery, College Green, Worcester.

== List of deans ==
=== Early modern ===
- 1541–1544 Henry Holbeach (last prior)
- 1544–1553 John Barlow
- 1553–1557 Philip Hawford
- 1557–1559 Seth Holland
- 1559–1571 John Pedder
- 1571–1586 Thomas Wilson
- 1586–1597 Francis Willis
- 1597–1604 Richard Edes
- 1604–1608 James Montague
- 1608–1616 Arthur Lake
- 1616–1627 Joseph Hall
- 1627–1633 William Juxon
- 1633–1636 Roger Maynwaring
- 1636–1646 Christopher Potter
- 1646–1649 Richard Holdsworth
- 1649–1660 No dean during the Interregnum
- 1660–1661 John Oliver
- 1661–1665 Thomas Warmestry
- 1665–1683 William Thomas
- 1683–1691 George Hickes
- 1691–1715 William Talbot
- 1715–1726 Francis Hare
- 1726–1746 James Stillingfleet
- 1746–1751 Edmund Marten
- 1751–1765 John Waugh
- 1765–1769 Richard Wrottesley
- 1769–1778 William Digby
- 1778–1783 Robert Foley
- 1783–1795 St Andrew St John (son of Lord St John of Bletso)

=== Late modern ===
- 1795–1817 Arthur Onslow
- 1817–1825 John Jenkinson
- 1825–1828 James Hook
- 1828–1845 George Murray, Bishop of Rochester
- 1845–1874 John Peel
- 1874–1879 Hon Grantham Yorke
- 1879–1886 Lord Alwyne Compton
- 1886–1891 John Gott
- 1891–1908 Robert Forrest
- 1908–1934 William Moore Ede
- 1934–1949 Arthur Davies
- 1949–1957 William Beck
- 1957–1968 Bobby Milburn
- 1969–1974 Eric Kemp
- 1975–1986 Tom Baker
- 1987–1996 Bob Jeffery
- 1996–2006 Peter Marshall
- 2006–2023 Peter Atkinson
- 2024–present Stephen Edwards (interim Dean since 2023)

== Sources ==
- B. Green, Bishops and Deans of Worcester (Worcester 1979).
