= James Stillingfleet (priest, born 1674) =

18th-century British priest

James Stillingfleet (1674–1746) was the Dean of Worcester from 1726 until his death in 1746.

He was the son of Edward Stillingfleet, Bishop of Worcester from 1689 to 1699. Educated at Wadham College, Oxford, he was Rector of Hartlebury and became a canon of Worcester in 1698.

Church of England titles
Preceded by Francis Hare	Dean of Worcester; 1726–1746	Succeeded by Edmund Marten
