= Robert Ferrar =

English bishop (died 1555)

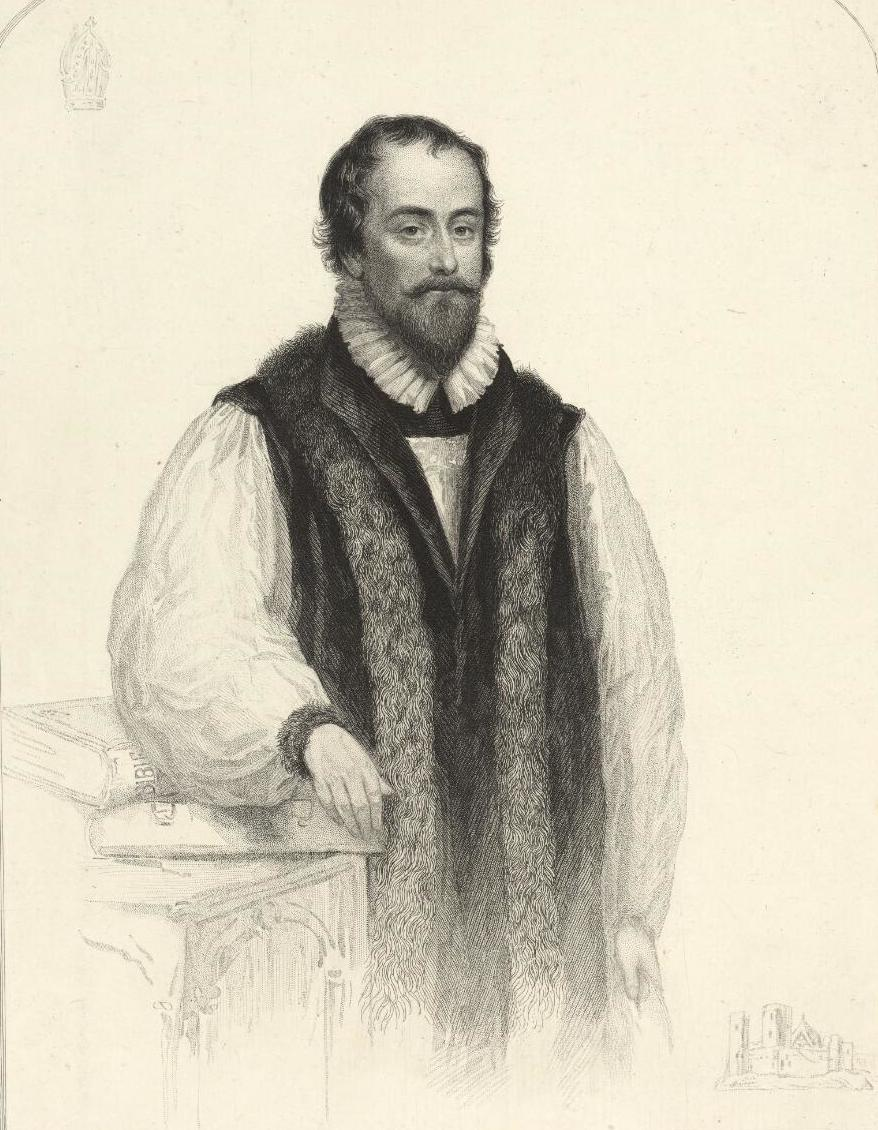
Robert Farrar

Robert Ferrar (died 30 March 1555) was a Bishop of St Davids in Wales. He was prior of Nostell Priory, embraced the English Reformation, and was made Bishop of St Davids by Edward VI. He suffered martyrdom during the Marian persecutions.

== Early life ==
There is no specific information on the date and place of Robert Ferrar's birth, but he did state to Stephen Gardiner that he was born in the reign of King Henry VII. It is assumed he was born in Yorkshire because of his later connections with the county: He was found first living at Nostell Priory in Yorkshire in the 1520s. On 24 May 1524, Ferrar was ordained successively as acolyte and subdeacon. On 24 September, four months later, he was ordained as deacon. After being ordained as a deacon all students participated in a profession, a promise to lead a life of poverty, chastity and obedience. Ferrar argued that to live chastely entailed a life of celibacy. From among the canons of Nostell he was chosen to receive the benefit of a university education sponsored by the priory. From c.1525–1534 Ferrar was a student at the University of Cambridge and University of Oxford, where he became a Bachelor of Theology.

== Influences ==
In 1526, while Ferrar was in Cambridge, a number of students took an interest in the teachings of Martin Luther, and were later to become prominent as reformers and martyrs of the English church. These included Thomas Cranmer, Hugh Latimer, Thomas Bilney, and Robert Barnes. They were bold enough to preach new doctrines publicly, but were accused of heresy and forced to conform with the traditional teaching. Also in 1528 the prior of St Mary's College at Oxford was John Ramsey. Among his books was a copy of Erasmus's Enchiridion militis Christiani or "Handbook of the Christian Soldier."

A group of scholars of the new Cardinal College spread the teachings of the reformer among Oxford students. Because Lutheranism was suspected within the college, a purge and search was ordered, and illegal reformist books were found. Ferrar was on John Foxe's list as possessing forbidden books, leading to his first arrest. Ferrar formally applied for his degree in theology in May 1533, which was granted.

After receiving his licence, Ferrar preached in the towns and villages near Nostell Priory where he was based. In June 1538 Thomas Cromwell appointed Ferrar as Prior of St. Oswald. Ferrar left the priorship by 1539 and there is little record of him for the next seven years. According to sources, he did not preach during this time.

When Henry VIII passed the Act of Six Articles Ferrar was a target for attack by those who sought to enforce it. He was summoned on 10 September 1540 for the safety of his soul and heretical views. When he failed to appear he was excommunicated. He bought land in 1545 for agricultural and business purposes.

== Ferrar as bishop ==
In 1547 Edward VI took the throne, and Ferrar was released from prison following the repeal of the Six Articles. He was then appointed as a preacher to represent Edward during the royal visitation of 1547. Ferrar worked to bring reforms, such as the addition of the English Bible, the exposure of idolatry and other "superstitious" activities, throughout several dioceses in England and Wales. Soon after, Ferrar was appointed as the Bishop of St Davids diocese by Edward VI on Sunday 9 September 1548. It is unclear why, but several months passed between Ferrar's consecration and his arrival at St Davids.

Upon his arrival, however, he moved for serious reforms. Ferrar pursued religious reform in his short term as bishop through parliamentary legislation, administration of ecclesiastical property, control over the cathedral chapter, supervision of clergy, enforcing discipline through court, and direct approaches to the congregation through biblical preaching. This radical restructuring led to conflict between him and his clergy, particularly Rowland Meyrick, appointed in 1550 as chancellor. A "blame game" ensued between them: Ferrar accused them of accepting bribes while his clergy claimed praemunire. This would eventually lead to his downfall when his clergy stood witness against Ferrar.

== Decline from bishop ==
Formal trouble arose for Ferrar when his canons at St Davids put together an indictment against him with 56 articles. The accusations against him were under the categories of:

1. Abuse of his authority;
2. Maintenance of superstition contrary to the King's ordinances and injunctions;
3. Wilful negligence; and
4. Folly.

Under the first category, it was alleged that when he first became bishop, he "appointed his chancellor by his letter of commission," ignoring the king's style and authority. In the second place, he was accused because he did not rebuke people who prayed with beads in their hands when he met with them, knowing that it was superstitious. He was also accused of not speaking about enough godly things; instead it was said that he spoke of worldly things such as: "baking, brewing," In addition, under category four he was accused that his church service was not paraphrased in English, and some of his churches did not have English bibles.

Ferrar responded twice to the charges made against him at Carmarthen. Foxe's Book of Martyrs contains a response, by an unknown writer, to the accusations made against Ferrar in 1551. This response is written in the style of a legal document, and was likely presented in 1552. An excerpt from this document reads,

The said bishop allegeth that he hath not ... used any superstitions of papistry, as it is untruly surmised against him; but hath and doth, to the uttermost of his power, wit, and cunning, set forth, preach, and teach, the true doctrine of the Gospel."

The articles presented against Ferrar in 1551 were inconclusive, so the Privy Council requested an examination of witnesses. It took place from 3 May to 7 May 1552. Ferrar was kept in London while the witnesses were being interviewed, so he would not affect how people answered the questions. Around 124 witnesses were interviewed.

The witness examinations were supposed to take place before three commissioners: Thomas Jones, John Wogan, and David Vaughan. Because so many witnesses were interviewed, over such a short period of time, the process of the commission was suspect. In November 1552, Ferrar was able to present objections concerning witness testimony. Ferrar believed that certain witnesses were biased, because they were people who had shown hostility towards him in the past. Witnesses who may have been biased in their accusations against Ferrar included Roger Barlow, Griffith Dwnn, Thomas John Thomas, and John Evans.

About half the witnesses' testimony concerned how Ferrar was aware of the crimes committed by his officers and friends, but failed to punish them. Brown sees this as "a concerted attempt to blacken Ferrar's name through attacking the character of his supporters." On the other hand, there were witnesses who denied the charges made against Ferrar. Roger Owen, a commissary of Ferrar, denied a few of the 56 articles.

Ferrar was sent to King's Bench Prison in Southwark when Queen Mary I took the throne in 1553. He was imprisoned with other bishops, including John Hooper of Gloucester and Miles Coverdale of Exeter. On 14 February 1554 Bishop Gardiner charged Ferrar with violation of chastity. "He was required to answer whether he believed in the lawfulness of clerical matrimony and in transubstantiation. For some time Ferrar refused to answer. At another sitting Bishop Morgan pronounced him contumacious, and condemned him." In March 1554, Ferrar officially lost his position as a bishop.

== Death ==
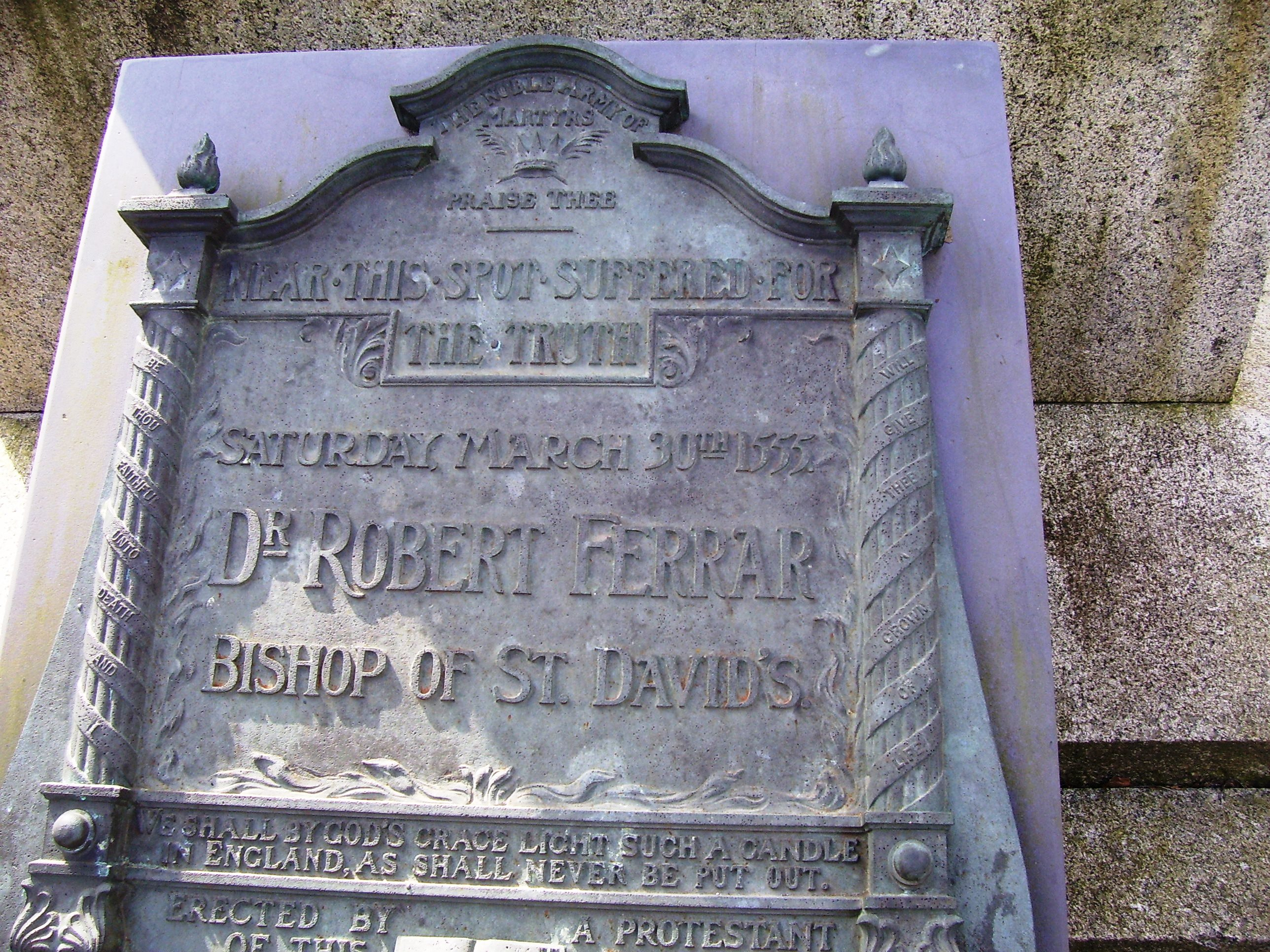
Memorial plaque to Robert Ferrar on Nott Square, Carmarthen

Ferrar's desire was to die as a "true bearer of the cross of Christ". His martyrdom took place on 30 March 1555 on the market square (now Nott's Square) in Carmarthen. He received this secular execution publicly as an example to any who were wishing to conform to his doctrines which were deemed inadequate and brought many accusations upon him. On 30 March he was burnt on the south side of the market cross, telling (a spectator) that "if he saw him once stir in the pains of his burning, he might then give no credit to his doctrine; and as he said, so did he maintain his promise, patiently standing without emotion, until one Richard Gravell with a staff struck him down."

Ferrar's death is the subject of a poem (first published 1957) called "The Martyrdom of Bishop Farrar" (sic) by the poet Ted Hughes. "Ted Hughes was related to Ferrar on his mother's side; the stoical gene helped him get through his own years of trial and persecution." The rumour turned out to be untrue and was family mythology, this is in part because Ferrar had no children himself. The rumour led to the British Library initially linking Hughes to the slave trade, a statement they later retracted.

There is a memorial to Bishop Robert Farrar (sic) in St Peter's Church, Carmarthen.

== Progeny ==
Ferrar's son, Samuel, obtained preferment in the Diocese of St Davids. His daughter married Lewis Williams, rector of Narberth, Pembrokeshire.

== Timeline ==
1485–1509: Ferrar is born sometime under the reign of Henry VII

1520s: Ferrar lives in St. Oswald's monastery

24 May 1524: Ordained acolyte and subdeacon at St. Oswald's

25 September 1524: Ordained as deacon at St. Oswald's

1525–1534: Studies at Cambridge and Oxford, acquiring a bachelor's degree in theology

1538–1539: Prior of St. Oswald's

1540: Ferrar is summoned for heresy under The Six Articles Act

1547: Edward VI takes rule after Henry VIII dies; Ferrar is appointed preacher to represent Edward during the royal visitation of 1547 to spread reforms

Sometime in 1548: Ferrar is married to his wife, Elizabeth

9 September 1548: Ferrar is consecrated as Bishop of St Davids, having been appointed by Edward VI

24 November 1548 – 14 March 1549: Ferrar attends the House of Lords and plays a role in the passing of the Uniformity Act, instituting mandatory English prayer books

1549: spends time travelling throughout his diocese preaching and spreading reforms under Edward VI

1550: Birth of his first son, Samuel

1551: Birth of second son, Griffith

Autumn 1551: 56 articles presented to Privy Council

1552: Statements are made on Ferrar's behalf that he "preached and taught the true doctrine of the Gospel"

May 1552: Commission of Witnesses interviewed

November 1552: Ferrar presents objections to witness testimony

1553: Mary I takes throne and Ferrar is sent to Bench Prison in Southwark

1553: Birth of third son, Sage

February 1554: Bishop Gardiner charges Ferrar with violation of chastity

March 1554: Ferrar officially loses his position of bishop

13 March 1555: Ferrar is sentenced to death for his crimes

30 March 1555: Ferrar is burned at the stake in Carmarthen

== Notes ==
Church of England titles
Preceded by William Barlow	Bishop of St Davids; 1549–1553	Succeeded by Henry Morgan
