= National Institute for Interdisciplinary Science and Technology =

Indian government laboratory

CSIR - National Institute for Interdisciplinary Science and Technology (NIIST)
- നാഷണൽ ഇൻസ്റ്റിറ്റ്യൂട്ട് ഫോർ ഇന്റർ ഡിസിപ്ലിനറി സയൻസ് ആൻഡ് ടെക്നോളജി
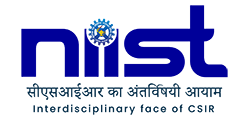
- Formation: 1975
- Headquarters: Industrial Estate PO, Thiruvananthapuram, India
- Director: Dr. C. Anandharamakrishnan
- Parent organization: Council of Scientific and Industrial Research
- Website: https://www.niist.res.in/
- Formerly called: CSIR - Trivandrum complex (Regional Research Laboratory)

The National Institute for Interdisciplinary Science and Technology (NIIST, formerly Regional Research Laboratory, Trivandrum) is a constituent laboratory of CSIR, India, engaged in research and development activities in the field of agroprocessing and technology, microbial processes and technology, chemical sciences and technology, material sciences and technology and process engineering and environmental technology. Around approximately 80 scientists and 300 research fellows are working in various scientific disciplines in this institute. The programmes have a blend of basic research, technology development and commercialization; have specific thrusts on frontier areas of research, National Mission Projects, regional resource-based activities and R & D - Industry - Academia linkages. The laboratory has collaborative programmes with major National & International agencies too. the present director of the institute is Dr.C. Anandharamakrishnan.

It was established in 1975 as a CSIR Complex, then named as the Regional Research Laboratory in 1978 and later renamed as NIIST in 2007.

== Early History of CSIR ==
In the early 1970s, the Kerala Government requested the establishment of a CSIR laboratory in the state. Responding to this, CSIR appointed Dr. Amla, Director of CFTRI, Mysore, as the Coordinating Director for the proposed CSIR Trivandrum Complex.

A high-level meeting held in 1974, chaired by the Chief Secretary of Kerala and CSIR Director General Dr. Y. Nayudamma, laid the foundation for the new laboratory. The Industrial Testing and Research Laboratory (ITRL), Thiruvananthapuram, along with adjoining land and infrastructure, was transferred to CSIR to serve as its nucleus. The Kerala Government also committed additional land and financial support for its expansion.

The Complex initially focused on spices, plantation products, flavour technology, and clay-based ceramics, with scientific guidance from CFTRI, Mysore, and CGCRI, Kolkata. Scientists, technical staff, equipment, and infrastructure were transferred from ITRL, CFTRI, and its Thrissur Experimental Station, establishing the laboratory's research capabilities.

Dr. A.G. Mathew served as Scientist-in-Charge until Dr. P.K. Rohatgi assumed charge as the first Director in August 1977. Administrative and financial systems were strengthened through appointments from CSIR Headquarters.

A major milestone was achieved in December 1978 when the CSIR Trivandrum Complex was upgraded as the Regional Research Laboratory (RRL), Trivandrum, becoming an independent, full-fledged national laboratory under CSIR.

== Research divisions ==
The major research divisions in NIIST are:

1. Advanced functional materials division (AFMD)
2. Agro and food processing technology division (AFPTD)
3. Artificial intelligence and Machine Learning (AI&ML) Unit
4. Biosciences and bioengineering division (BBD)
5. Centre for Sustainable Energy Technologies (C-SET)
6. Centre of excellence in ayurveda research
7. Chemical sciences and technology division (CSTD)
8. Critical minerals and metals division (CMMD)
9. Environmental technology division (ETD)

== Agro and food processing technology division ==
This is the division in charge of undertaking research in developing technologies for processing of oil seeds, spices and natural products. The core competence of the division is in process and product development and on the transformation of such processes into fully engineered technology packages for commercial exploitation. The division has set up a number of commercial plants in many states and extended technical expertise in making policy decisions in relevant areas by governmental and non governmental agencies. Technology Business Incubation Centre (TBIC) in the area of spices and natural products contribute towards development of innovative technologies. Major research includes quality improvement of palm oil, spice oil/ oleoresins, swing technology for processing of fresh and dry spices, Refrigeration Adsorption Dehumidified Drying (RADD) of heat sensitive materials, Ginger oil extraction, and nutraceutical studies.

== Artificial intelligence and Machine Learning (AI&ML) Unit ==
The Artificial Intelligence and Machine Learning (AI & ML) Unit at CSIR–National Institute for Interdisciplinary Science and Technology (CSIR-NIIST) conducts research in data-driven modeling, predictive analytics, and intelligent decision-making systems. The unit develops machine learning and artificial intelligence methods for the analysis of complex scientific and industrial datasets. Its research activities include predictive modeling, data visualization, image analysis, data integration, and hybrid computational approaches that combine artificial intelligence with mathematical and system-dynamics models.

The unit supports interdisciplinary applications across sectors such as agriculture, food processing, healthcare, energy, and environmental sciences. It also contributes to the development of data science and AI-based solutions for research and technology development.

== Biosciences and bioengineering division ==
The Biosciences and bioengineering division (BBD) conducts research in microbial biotechnology and its applications in industrial processes, food and nutraceutical production, bioenergy, and sustainable biomanufacturing. The division develops microbial and fermentation-based technologies for the production of enzymes, biofuels, biochemicals, biomaterials, and value-added products from renewable resources.

Research activities include lignocellulosic biorefineries, biomass conversion, microbial production of industrial chemicals and biopolymers, probiotics and nutraceuticals, algal biotechnology, waste valorization, plant–microbe interactions, microbial genomics, and systems biology. The division also investigates microbial diversity, metabolic engineering, synthetic biology, and bioprocess development for applications in agriculture, environmental sustainability, and the bio-based economy.

== Centre for Sustainable Energy Technologies ==
The Centre for Sustainable Energy Technologies (C-SET) at CSIR–National Institute for Interdisciplinary Science and Technology (CSIR-NIIST) was established in 2023 to coordinate and expand the institute's research activities in energy technologies. The centre was inaugurated on 28 July 2023 by Vijay Kumar Saraswat. CSIR-NIIST serves as the nodal laboratory for Energy Conversion and Related Devices, a sub-area within the Energy and Energy Devices (EED) theme of the Council of Scientific and Industrial Research.

C-SET conducts research on renewable energy generation, energy storage, and energy management technologies. Its research areas include third-generation photovoltaic technologies, distributed renewable energy systems, agrivoltaics, building-integrated photovoltaics, green hydrogen production, fuel cells, supercapacitors, batteries, thermoelectric generators, smart windows, energy-efficient photodetectors, and solid-state lighting technologies.

== Centre of excellence in ayurveda research ==
The Centre of Excellence in Ayurveda Research (CEAR) is a research centre focused on the scientific study and development of Ayurveda. The centre undertakes research on the standardization, quality assessment, and evaluation of Ayurvedic formulations, herbal products, Ayur-Ahara, and nutraceuticals using modern analytical and interdisciplinary approaches.

CEAR supports research activities related to herbal medicines, quality assurance, product development, translational research, and regulatory science. The centre also promotes collaboration between traditional Ayurvedic knowledge systems and contemporary scientific methodologies to facilitate research, innovation, and capacity building in the Ayurveda and herbal sectors.

== Environmental technology division ==
The Environmental Technology Division (ETD) conducts research on environmental monitoring, pollution control, waste management, and sustainable environmental technologies. The division develops processes and analytical methods for addressing environmental challenges and provides technical and testing services to industrial and public-sector organizations.

Research activities are carried out by a multidisciplinary team with expertise in environmental engineering, chemical sciences, microbiology, biotechnology, and environmental science. The division operates accredited analytical laboratories and pilot-scale research facilities that support environmental assessment, technology development, and regulatory compliance studies.

The division's laboratories hold accreditation for the analysis of contaminants, including persistent organic pollutants and heavy metals, in food, feed, water, and environmental samples.
