= Caltanissetta Cathedral =

Roman Catholic cathedral in Sicily

Coordinates: 37.4896°N 14.0639°E

Cathedral of Santa Maria la Nova
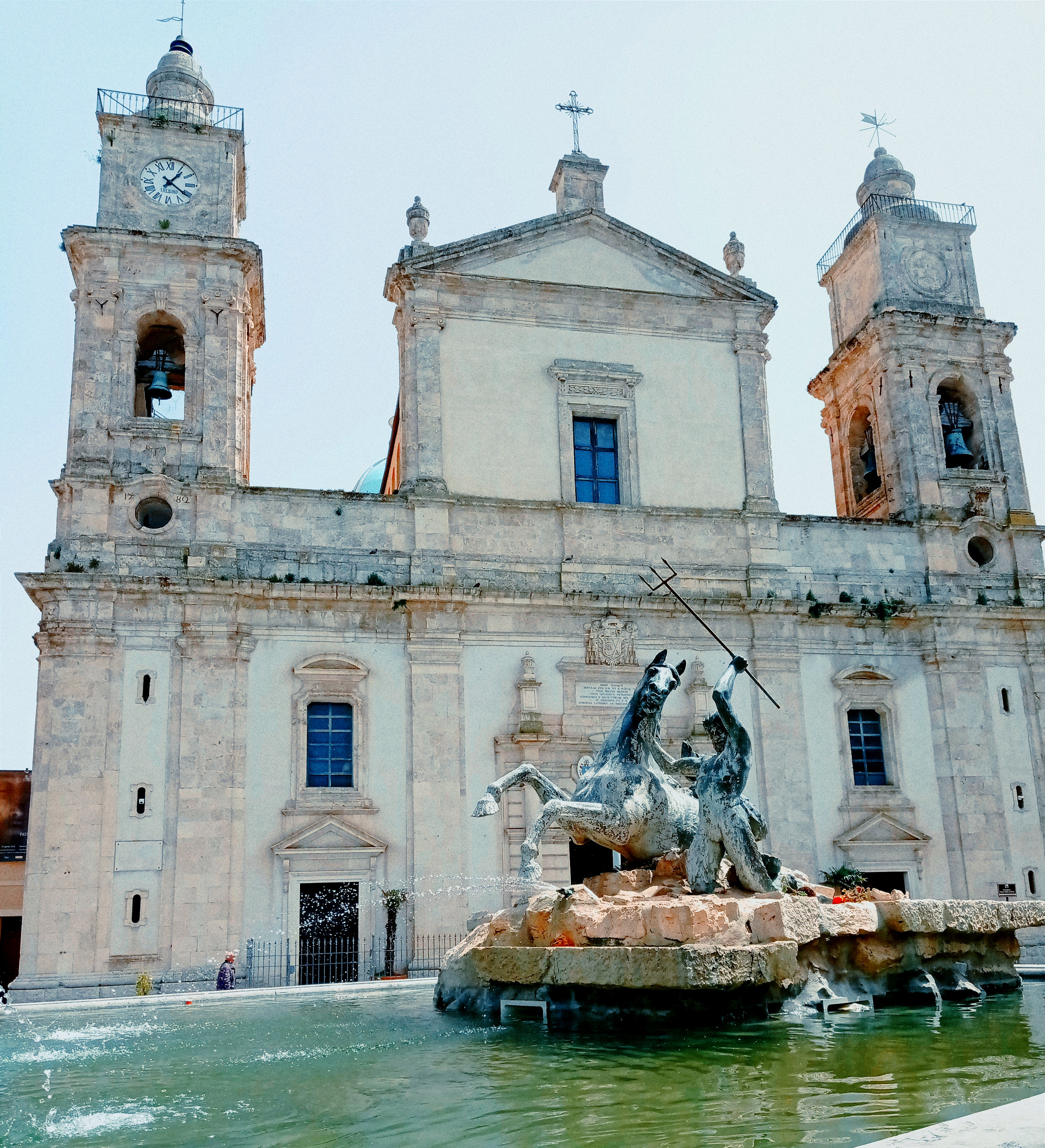
- Front view of the Cathedral with the Triton Fountain
- Cathedral of Santa Maria la Nova
- Location: Caltanissetta, Sicily, Italy
- Denomination: Roman Catholic
- Website: Parish website

History
- Dedication: Mary
- Consecrated: 1622

Architecture
- Style: Baroque
- Groundbreaking: 1560
- Completed: 1620

Administration
- Diocese: Caltanissetta

Caltanissetta Cathedral, also known as the Church of Santa Maria la Nova, is the cathedral of the Diocese of Caltanissetta.

== History ==
The earliest known mother church was the Church of Santa Maria, later called degli Angeli (due to a painting of the Madonna surrounded by angels) or la Vetere to distinguish it from the new mother church. This new church, built around the year 1000 as the palatine chapel of the Pietrarossa Castle, became the parish seat by a decree of Frederick II in 1239. Before this, pastoral care was entrusted to the Santo Spirito Abbey (since 1095).

In the 15th century, the parish was relocated to the Church of Santa Domenica within the city, and in 1518, to the larger San Domenico Church.

In the 16th century, as the city expanded north of the castle and the mother church, which became peripheral, the people expressed a desire for a larger, more centrally located mother church. In 1545, Archpriest Francesco Diforti established a committee for the construction of a new church, which acquired the small Immacolata church and a large plot of land in the so-called Chianu di l'olivi, facing the Carmine church and convent.

In 1570, the construction of the temple began with a solemn cornerstone ceremony and was completed in 1622. Originally, it had three naves, each ending in a large chapel: the central one dedicated to the Immaculate Conception, the left to the Blessed Sacrament, and the right to Saint Michael the Archangel. The naves ended before the current transept.

From 1718 to 1720, at the expense of Archpriest Raffaele Riccobene, the Flemish painter Guglielmo Borremans (1670–1744) was commissioned, along with his son Luigi, to fresco the vault and central nave and to paint the altarpiece of the high altar, depicting the Immaculate Conception.

On July 26, 1733, the mother church was consecrated by the Bishop of Agrigento, Lorenzo Gioeni, under the title of Santa Maria la Nova and Saint Michael the Archangel.

Through his will, Don Raffaele Riccobene left a substantial sum to complete the internal decorations and, if funds remained, for the facade. Work on the facade and the raising of the left bell tower began in 1782 and concluded with the construction of the right bell tower in 1856. In 1848, with 400 ounces donated by Baroness Agata Barile Giordano, an iron fence was built to enclose the parvise, which was reduced in 1892 and removed in the 1950s. It was restored, though much smaller, in 2010, through the free labor of the blacksmiths' guild of the Real Maestranza.

In the meantime, with the establishment of the Diocese of Caltanissetta in 1844, the mother church was elevated to a cathedral, as commemorated by the plaque on the main portal.

In 1922, expansion work began (construction of the transept and presbytery), which was halted during World War II but resumed afterward due to the severe bombing of July 9, 1943, which destroyed part of the frescoed vault. The work, including the restoration of the vault, was completed in 1946.

== Description ==
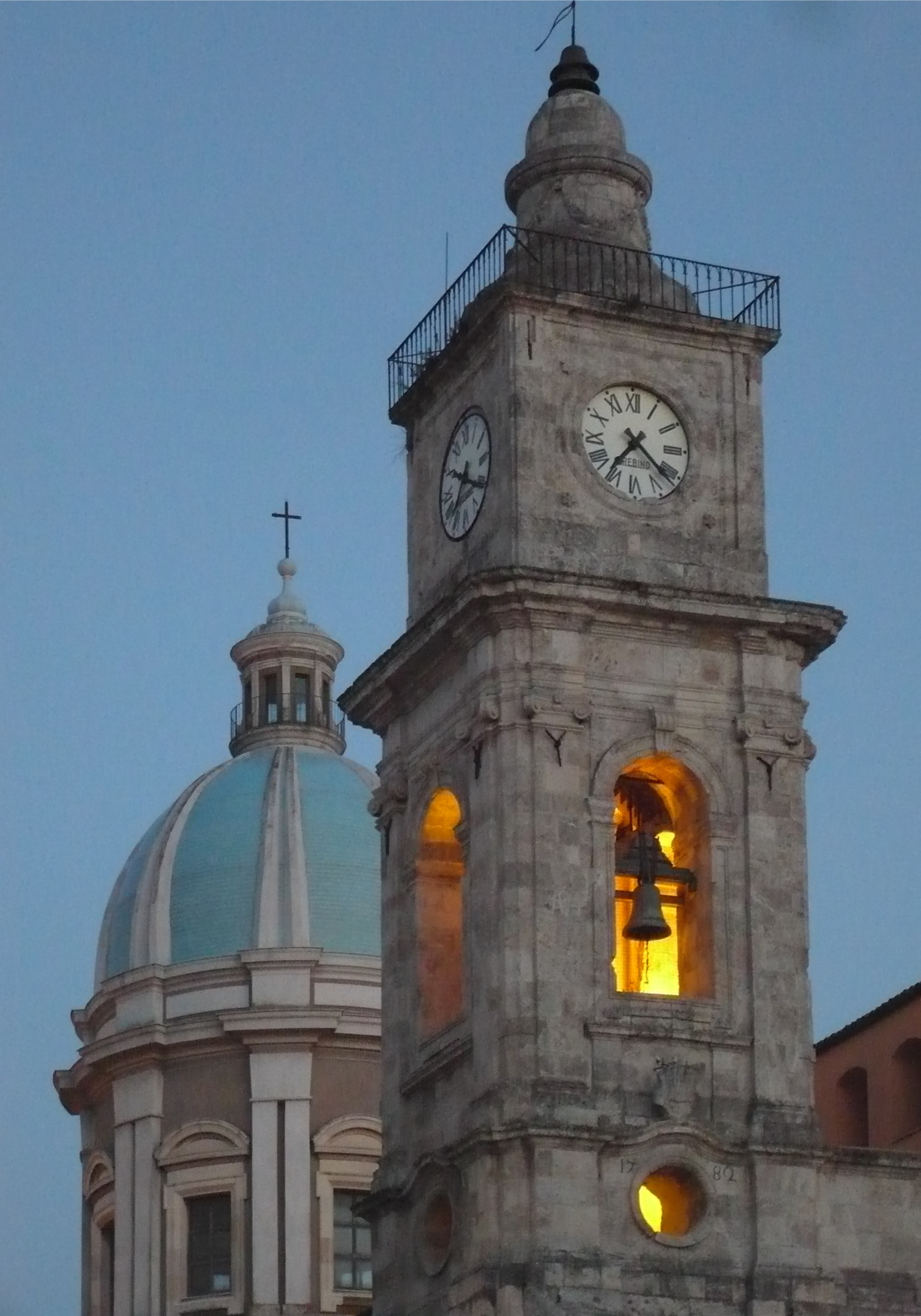
Bell tower and dome

The cathedral features a broad facade divided by pilasters, flanked by two bell towers, and dominates the entire Piazza Garibaldi. The interior, in the shape of a Latin cross, is divided into three naves supported by fourteen arches, each dedicated to a figure from the Old Testament. Before the 1943 bombing, these arches supported figures of the twelve apostles. At the intersection of the two arms of the cross, above the altar, is the dome.

The remarkable series of frescoes adorning the central nave is the work of the Flemish painter Guglielmo Borremans (1670–1744), who worked in Caltanissetta in 1720. The three central scenes, depicting the Immaculate Conception, the Coronation of the Virgin, and the triumph of Saint Michael, are presented to visitors alongside depictions of cherubs, clouds, and gilded floral stucco. The lavish stucco decorative scheme, consisting of friezes, volutes, medallions, shells, faux pillars, and columns in the rocaille style, was crafted by Francesco Ferrigno. A signed work with the inscription "Franciscus Ferrigno, Architectus Panormitanus" is documented on the faux niche of the high altar.

In the second chapel on the right, notable is the presence of a wooden statue of the Immaculate Conception, crafted in 1760, adorned with precious silver foil drapery. In the chapel adjacent to the main one, there are representations of Saint Michael (patron of the city since the 17th century), a wooden statue by Stefano Li Volsi, and the archangels Gabriel and Raphael, marble sculptures by Vincenzo Vitaliano. On the high altar, one can admire the Immaculate Conception and Saints, a large altarpiece by Borremans. Also noteworthy are a precious carved and decorated organ, a painting of Our Lady of Mount Carmel by Filippo Paladini (1544–1614), and a crucifix once attributed to Friar Umile from Petralia (1580–1639).

In the right nave, at the Blessed Sacrament chapel, formerly the choir chapel, there is a large stained glass window completed in two phases, in 1958 and 1965, by Amalia Panigati, depicting the Stories of the Life of Saint Ursula and Saint Francis Xavier.

The cathedral's exterior is enhanced by the vast and lively square dedicated to Giuseppe Garibaldi: standing opposite is the 16th-century San Sebastiano Church, and at the center is the scenic Triton Fountain by Gaetano Averna (installed on December 15, 1956), featuring a bronze group from 1890 by sculptor Michele Tripisciano (1860–1913).

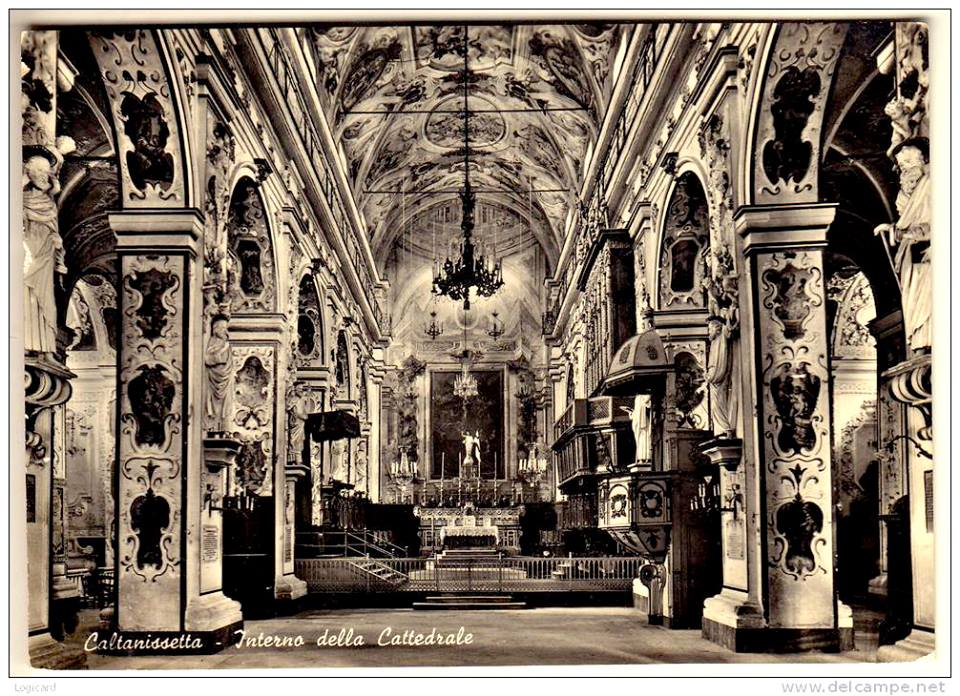
Interior of the cathedral before 1943

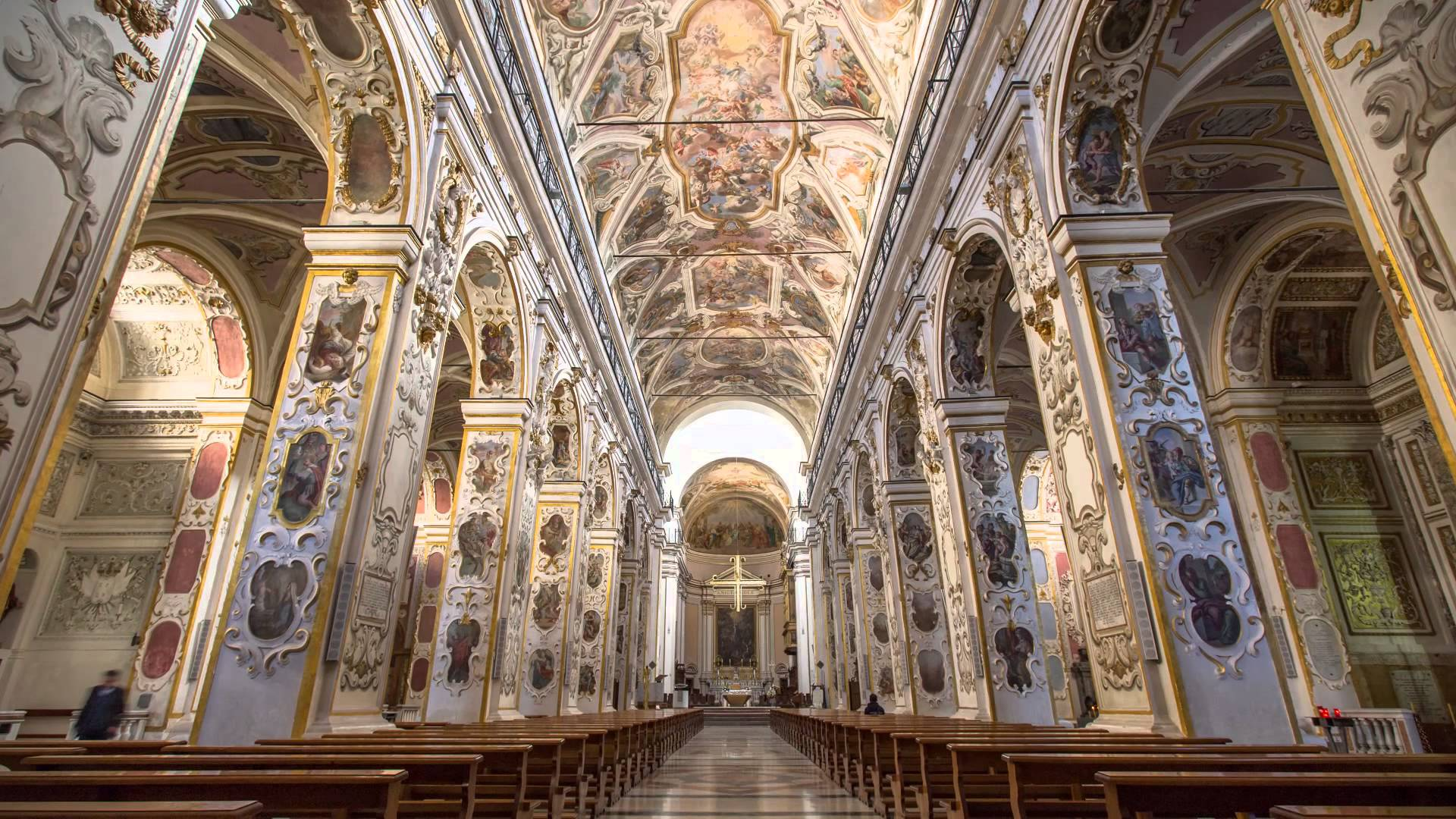
Interior of the cathedral today

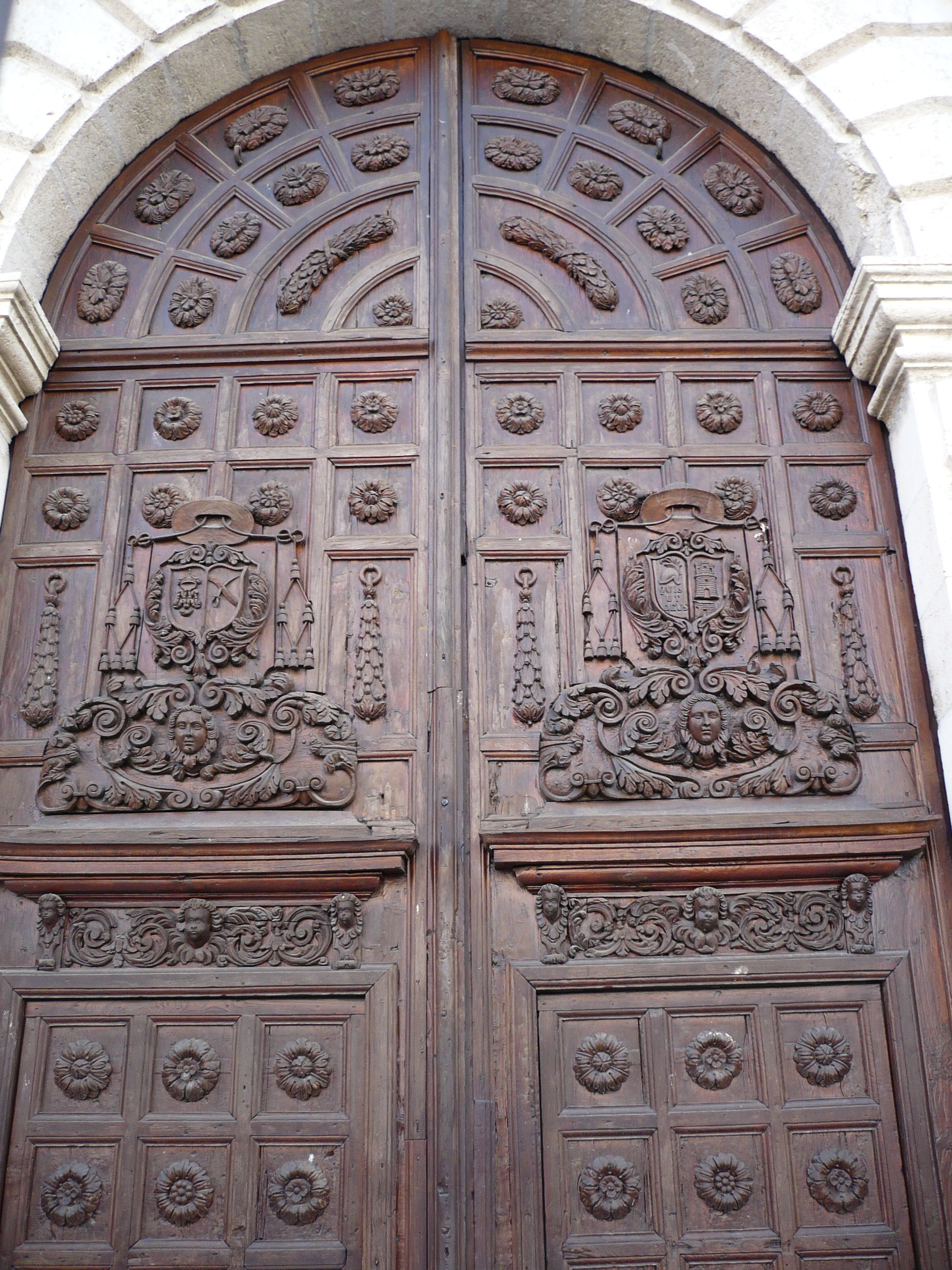
Wooden portal

=== Left nave ===
- Saint Felix Chapel:

The first chapel in the left nave is dedicated to Saint Felix. It contains two sepulchral monuments, both dedicated to members of the Barile family, Giuseppe and Giovanni. At the center is a painting by the Caltanissetta painter Vincenzo Roggeri, depicting the martyrdom of Saint Felix, with the saint kneeling in the foreground, hands clasped, awaiting his execution; behind him, a man with a raised sword. In the upper right, a man seated on a high pedestal is about to give the execution order. Below the painting is an altar with a reliquary. In 1883, the Barile family commissioned the Palermitan Giuseppe Patania to restore Roggeri's painting. They purchased an altar (still present today) from Acireale, paved the chapel with marble, and enclosed it with gates. They also commissioned a sculpted and gilded urn, designed by Baron Starrabba, to house the saint's relics. These relics were placed in the urn on the second Sunday of July 1883, following a solemn ceremony presided over by Bishop Monsignor Giovanni Guttadauro.

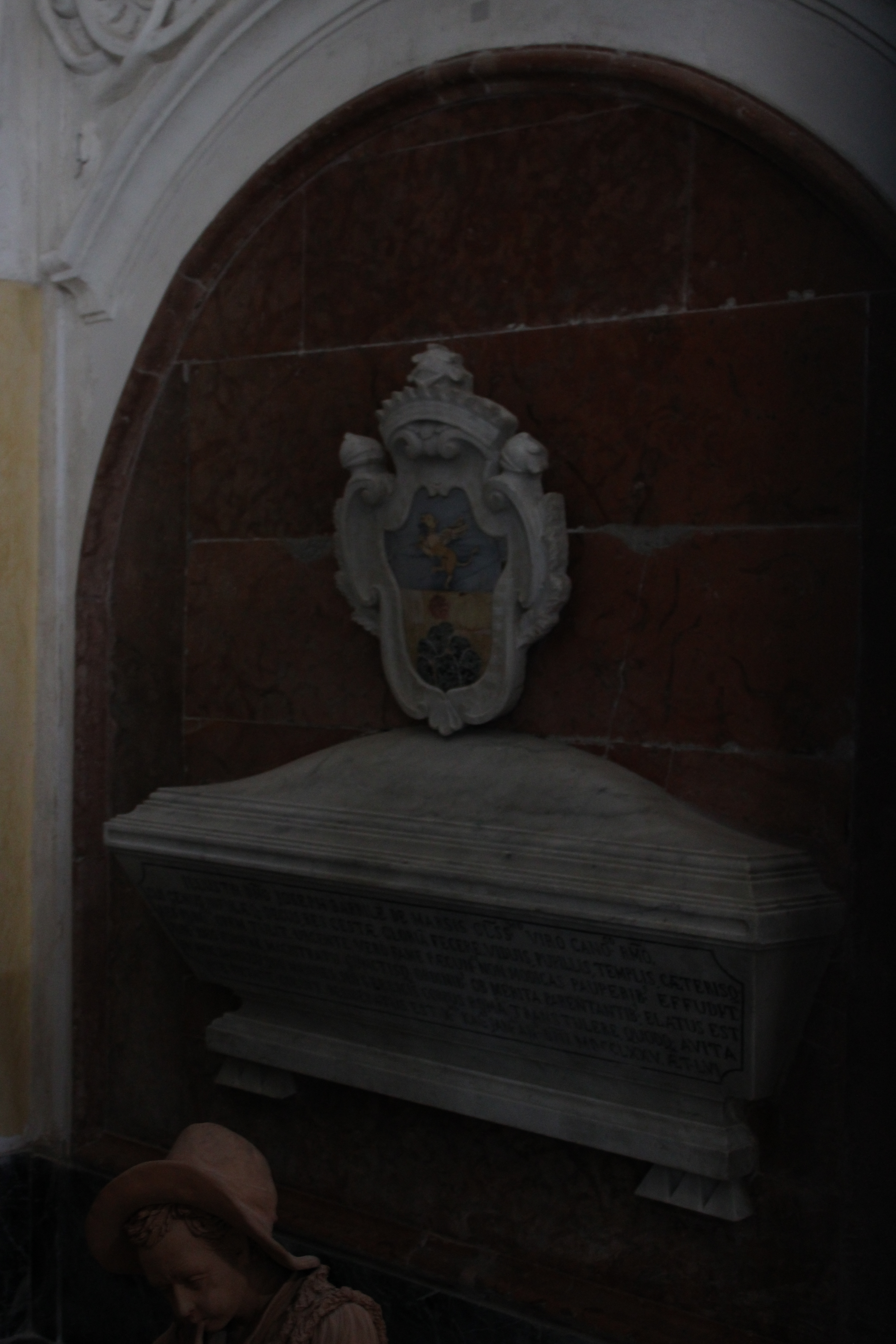
Sepulchre of Canon Giuseppe Barile

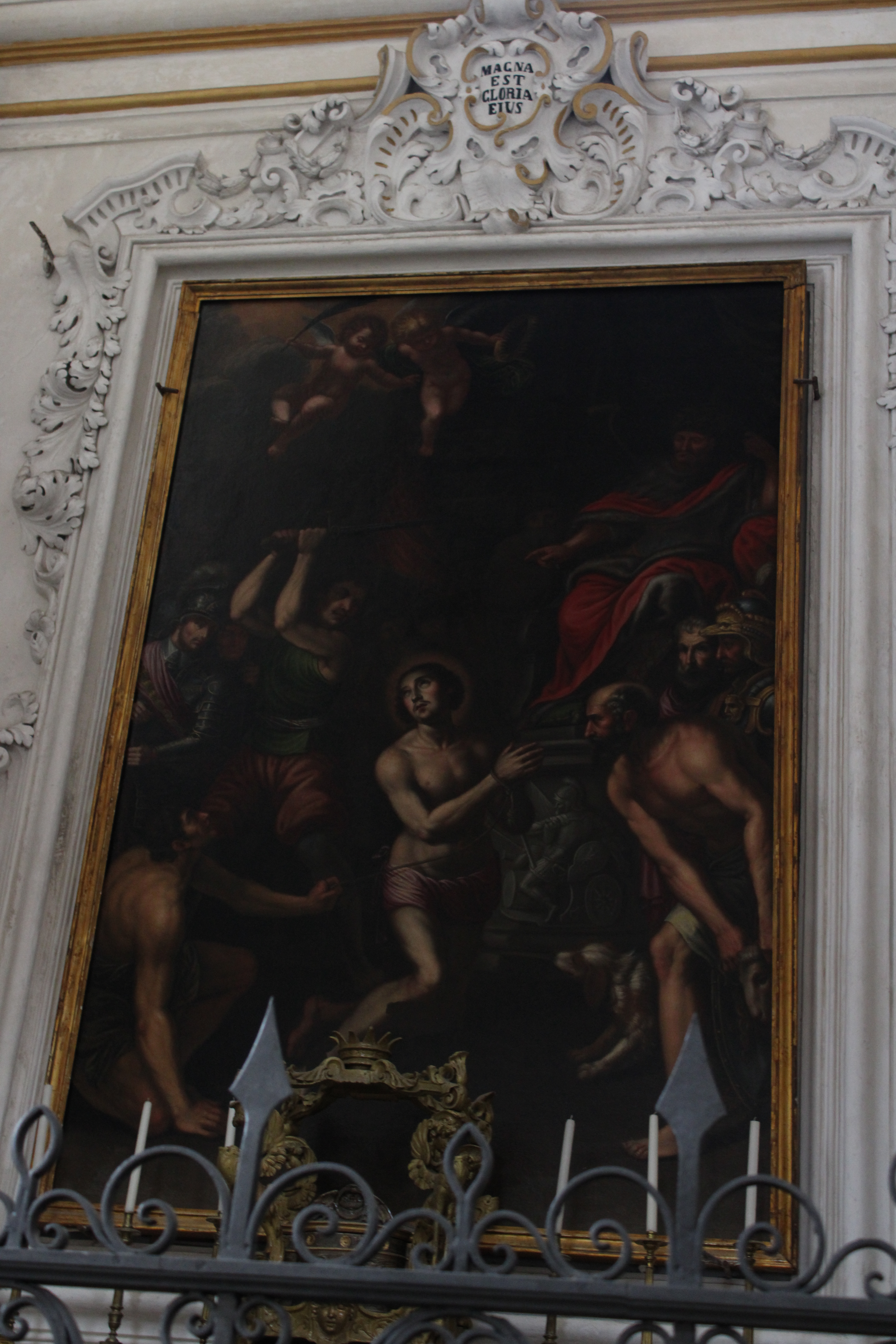
Saint Felix by Roggeri

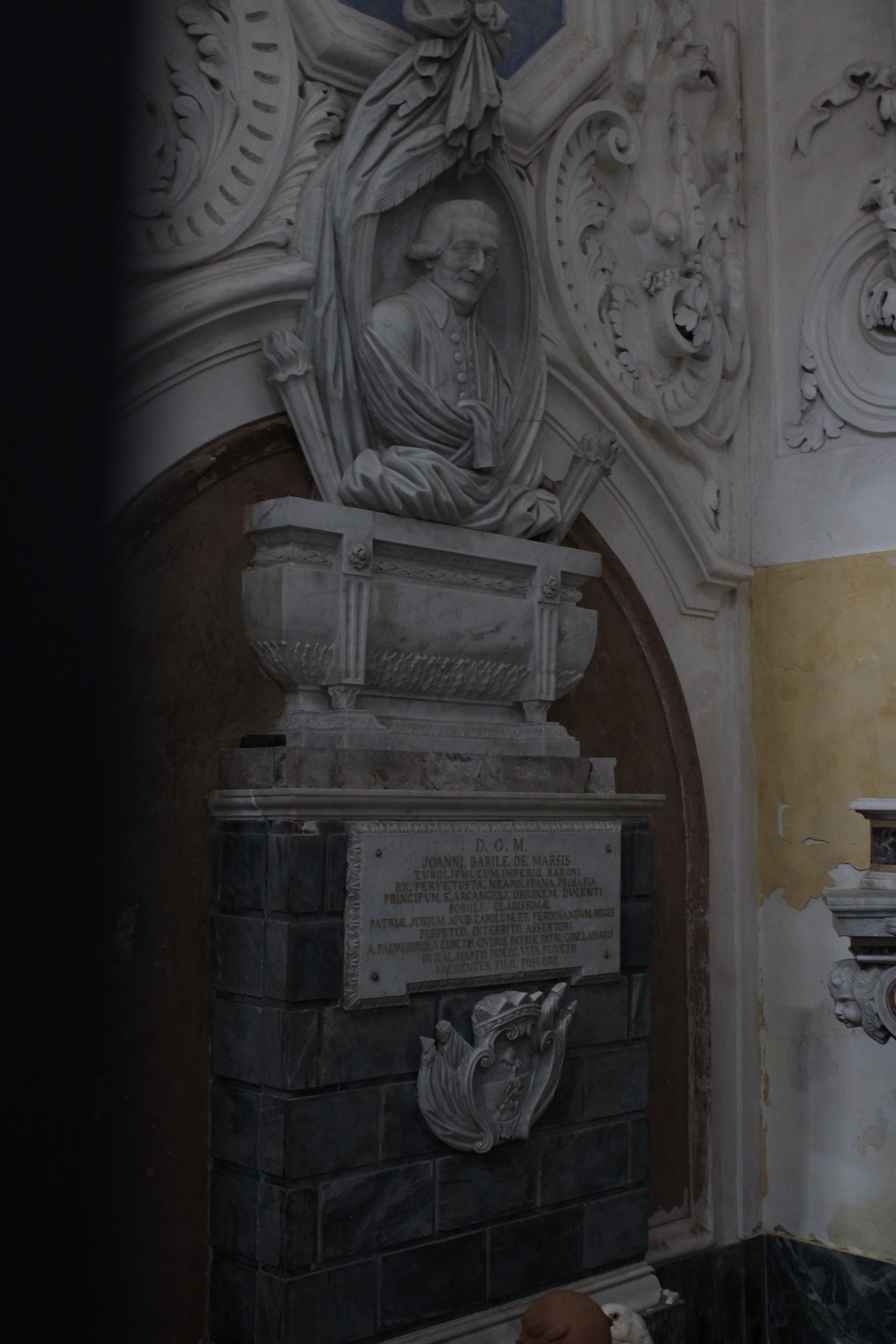
Sepulchre of Giovanni Barile

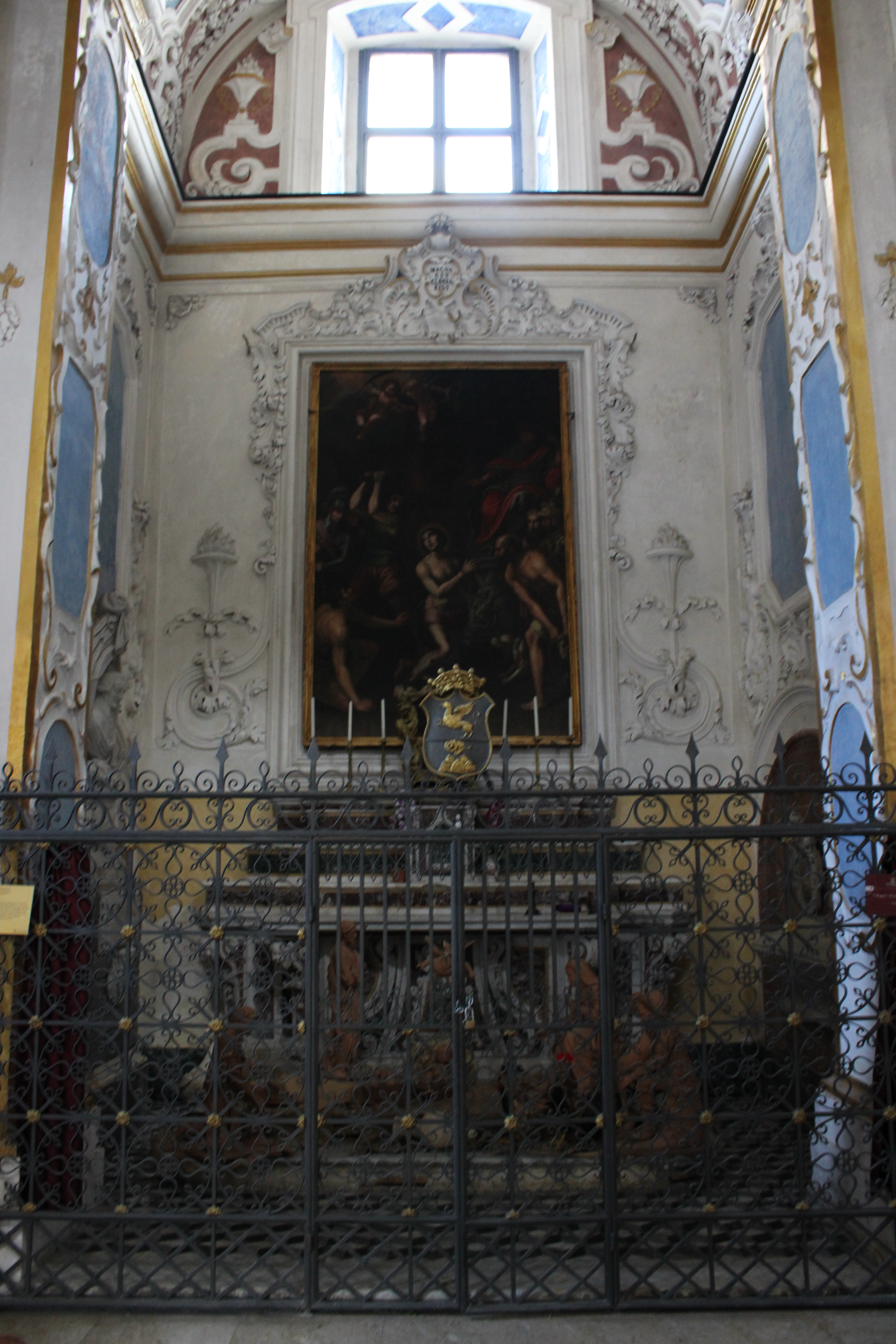
Saint Felix Chapel
- Crucifix Chapel:

The Crucifix Chapel is the second chapel in the left nave. At its center is a crucifix attributed to Friar Umile from Petralia. On either side, in two niches, are sculptures by the Neapolitan Francesco Biangardi: Saint John and Our Lady of Sorrows. The chapel is also decorated with stucco, and at its center is a marble altar. The balustrade is a devotional work by Enrico Meschino, built in 1927.

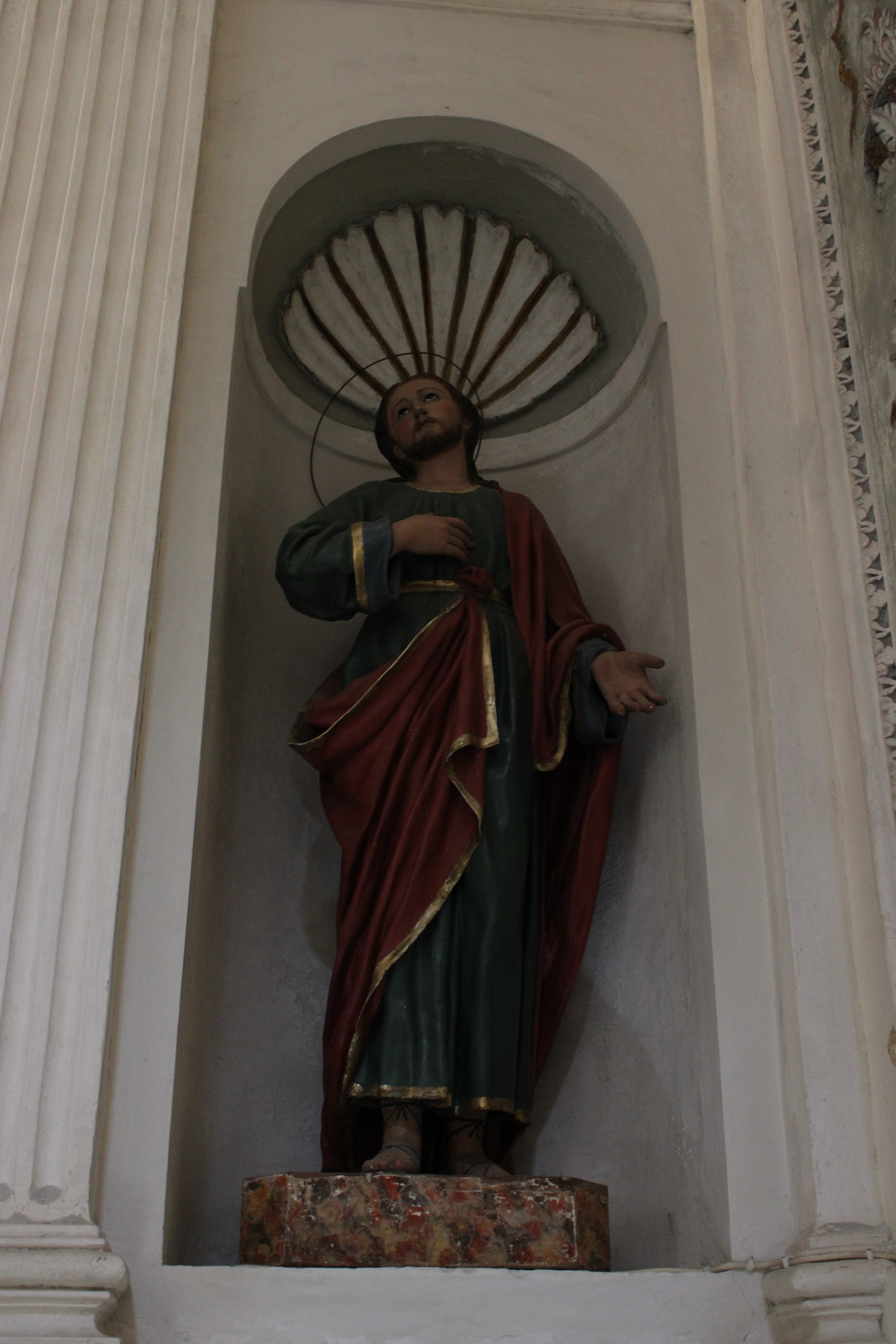
Saint John

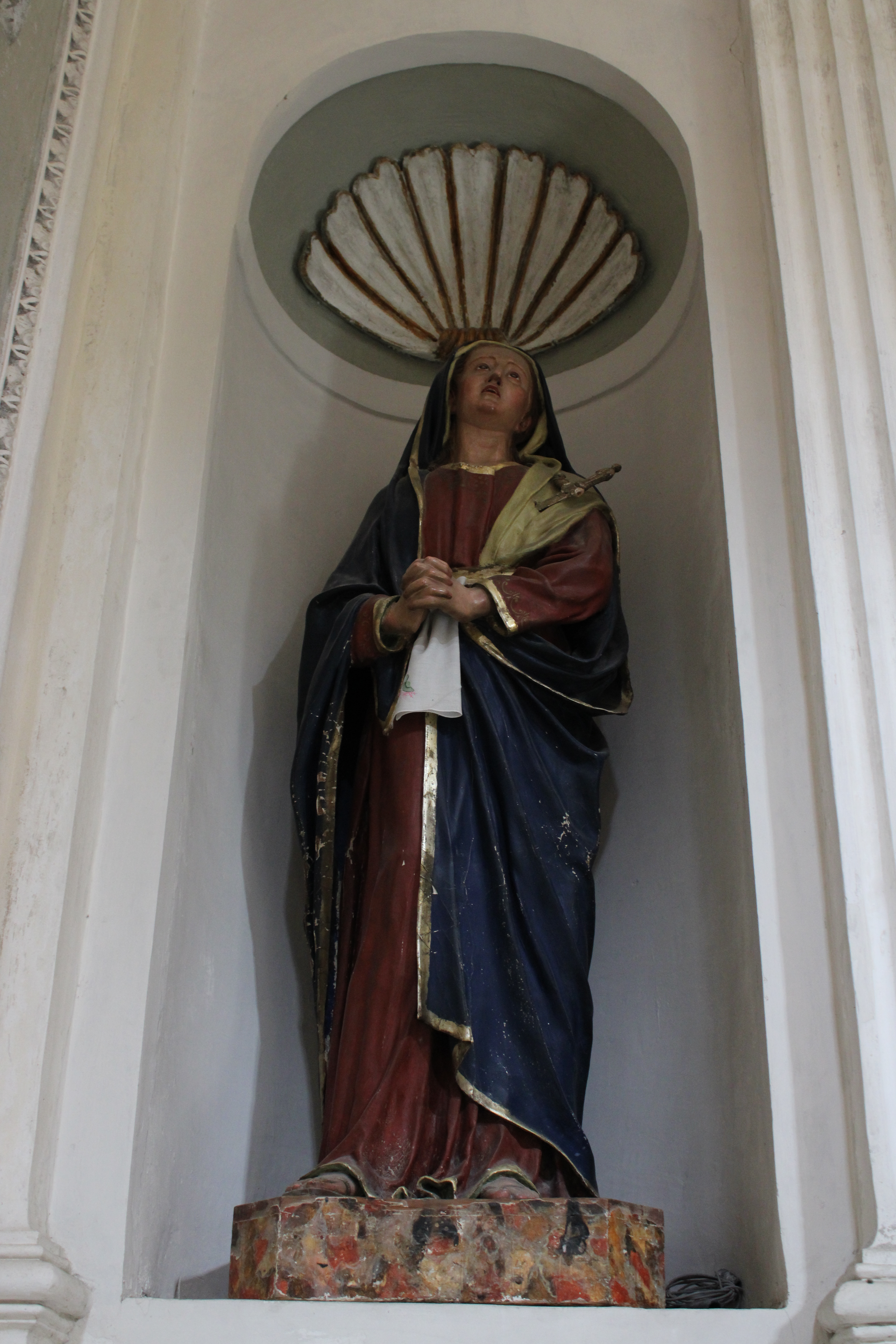
Our Lady of Sorrows

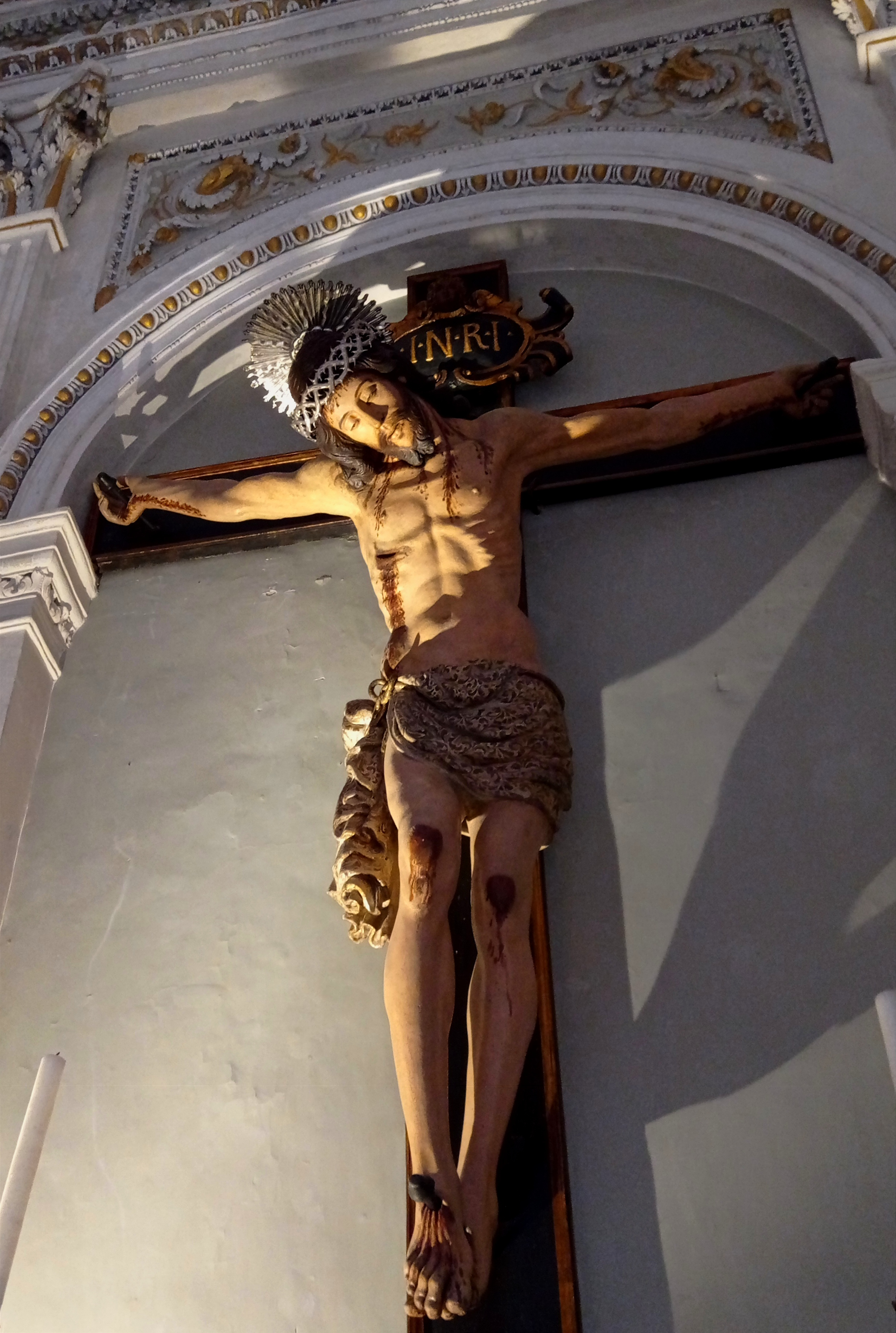
Crucifix
- Our Lady of the Rosary Chapel:

This chapel contains three statues in separate niches: at the center, Our Lady of the Rosary, on the left wall a saint, and on the right wall Saint Isidore the Laborer.

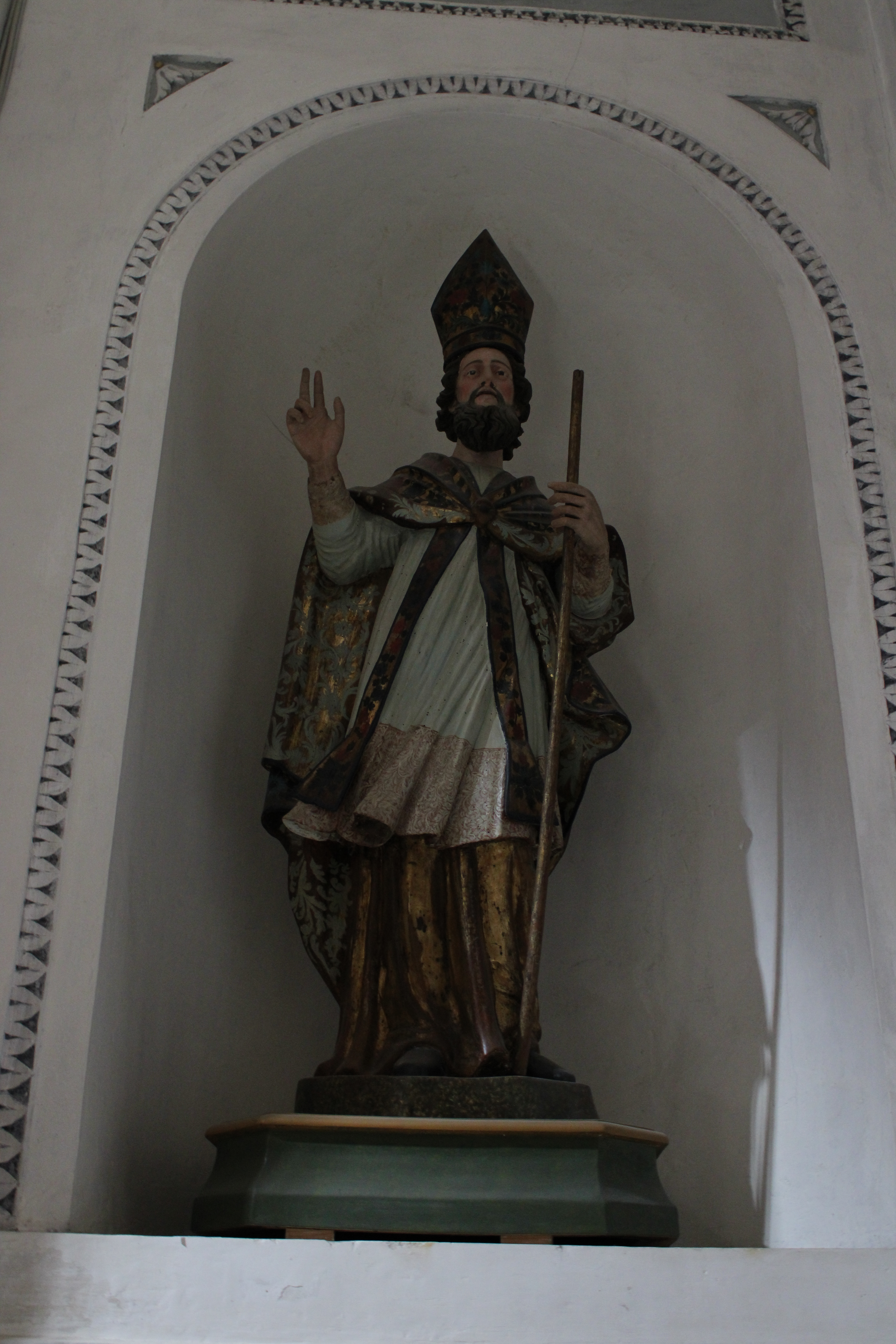
Saint

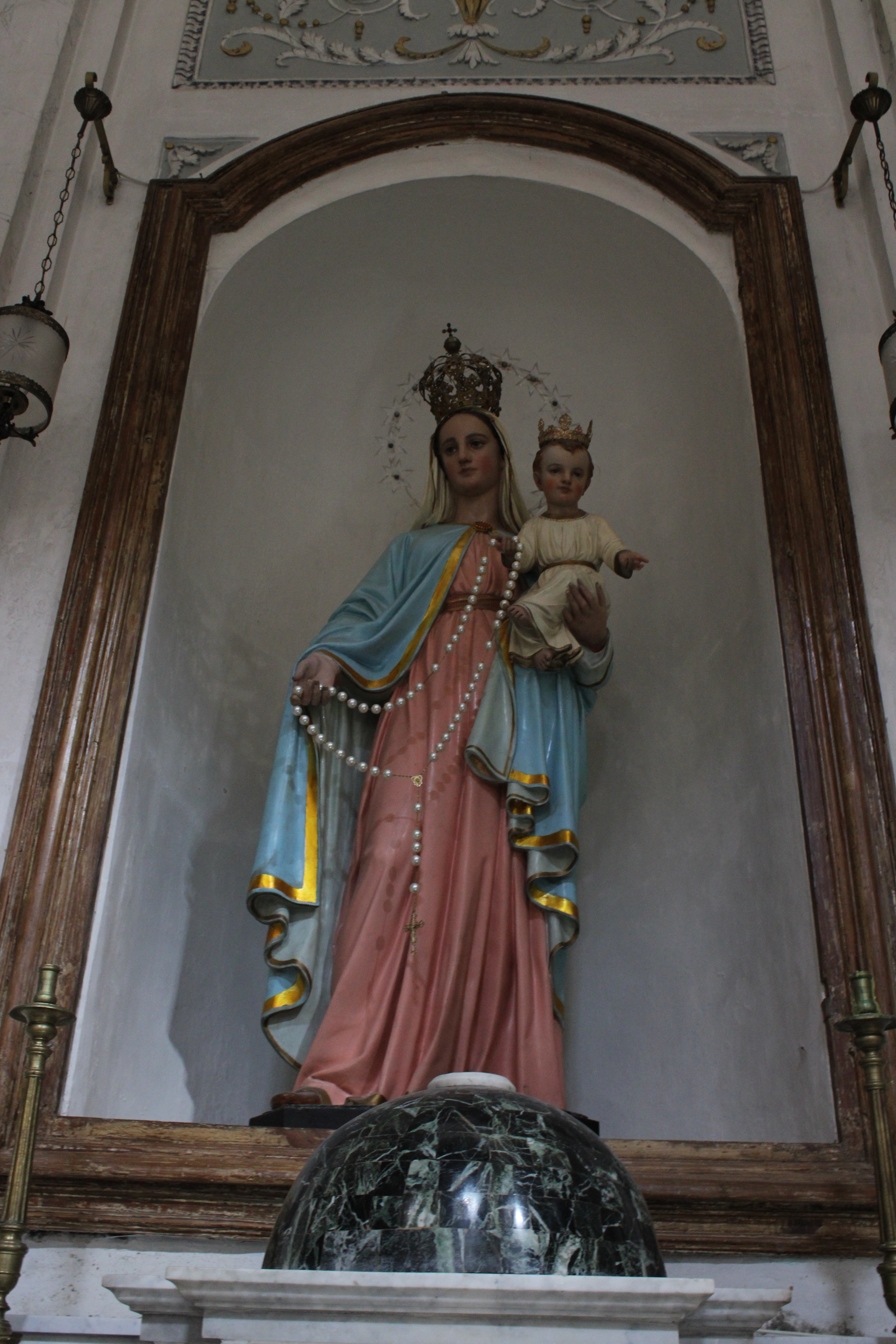
Our Lady of the Rosary

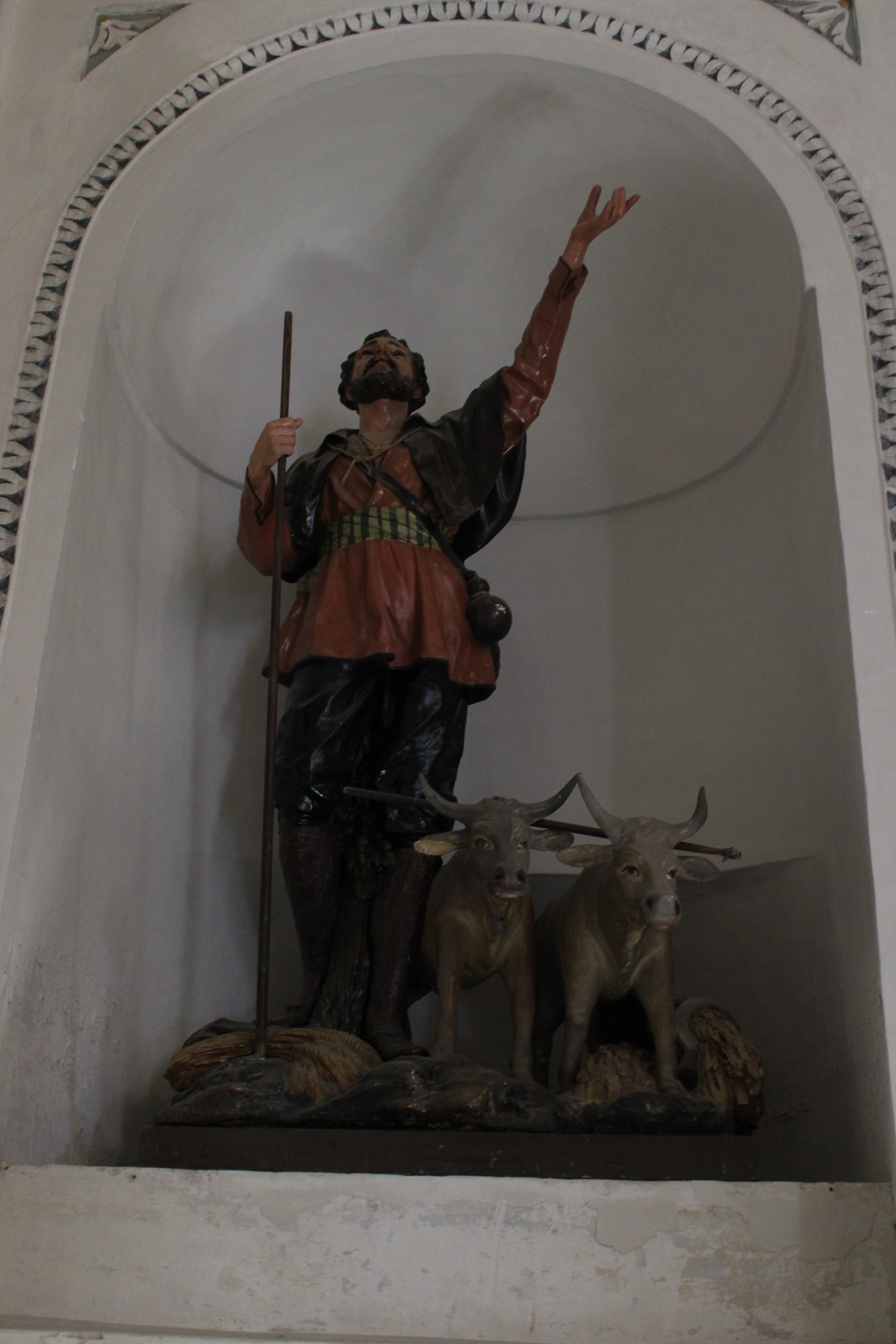
Saint Isidore

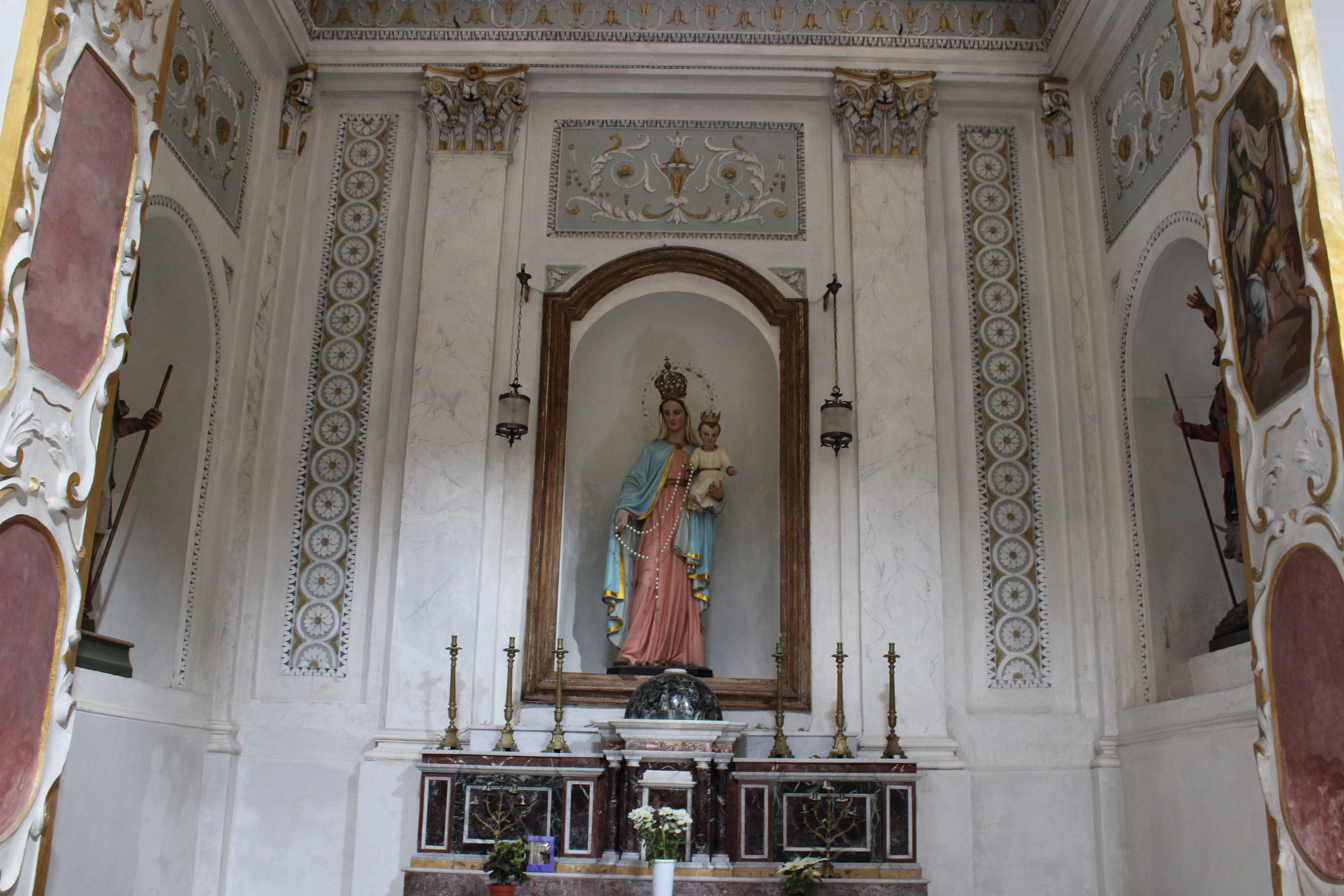
Our Lady of the Rosary Chapel
- Commemorative Inscription of Arcangelo Vignuzzi:

On the pillar separating the Rosary Chapel from the Redeemer Chapel is a plaque in memory of citizen Arcangelo Vignuzzi, which reads:

Fortunae vices bono tuo disce.

Illvstris et spectabilis dominus Archangelvs Vignvzzi Regis e consilio hic jacet. Qvid in eo fvit potivs bonae artes, amoeniora stvdia, svblimiora jvra omnia sic, vt nil, praeter jvstitia, magis qvadraginta annos Panormi jvridicvndo exegit praetvrae et consilii bonorvm plavsv jvdex fvit dvm maiora virvm optimvm manebant, caecitate pressvs, Calatanixectae vbi natvs est, obiit, eximie spei vir clarissimus kalendae jvnii mdcclxxvi: moestissima mater, fratres, et sores, vt svo, vt civivm moerori parcant optime de familia patriaqve merito hoc amoris perenne monimentvm

datvm decreto decvriorvm
Learn the vicissitudes of fortune for your own good.

The illustrious and honorable Don Arcangelo Vignuzzi lies here by royal decree. What was most admirable in him were his noble arts, his more pleasing studies, and his exalted legal knowledge, all pursued with justice above all else. For over forty years, he practiced law in Palermo, serving as a judge of the Praetorian Court and the Consistory with the approval of the virtuous. While greater things awaited this excellent man, oppressed by blindness, he returned to Caltanissetta, where he was born, and died, a man of great promise, on June 1, 1776. His grieving mother, brothers, and sisters, mindful of both their own sorrow and that of the citizens, in recognition of his merits to family and homeland, erected this enduring monument of love.

Granted by decree of the Decurions.

— Unknown Sicilian

The original inscription is rich in abbreviations, here presented in full. This inscription, dating to 1776, was originally placed in the floor but was relocated to its current position after the floor was redone. The plaque is framed by a marble border and divided into two parts: at the top is the coat of arms, presumably of the family, surmounted by a crown frieze; below is the commemorative inscription in honor of Vignuzzi. Mulè Bertòlo's work, which cites information from Luciano Aurelio Barrile, Don Camillo Genovese, and Biagio Punturo, provides insights into Arcangelo Vignuzzi's life: he was born on February 28, 1715, in Caltanissetta. He studied literature and philosophy with the Jesuits, then excelled in jurisprudence in Palermo, where he settled. He held important positions, including praetorian judge in 1760 and 1761; in 1763, during a severe famine, he visited Sicilian universities as a delegate minister to assess available resources; in 1769 and 1770, he was elevated to the office of judge of the Consistory. After becoming blind, he returned to Caltanissetta, where he died on June 1, 1776, at the age of sixty-one, and this monument was dedicated to him.

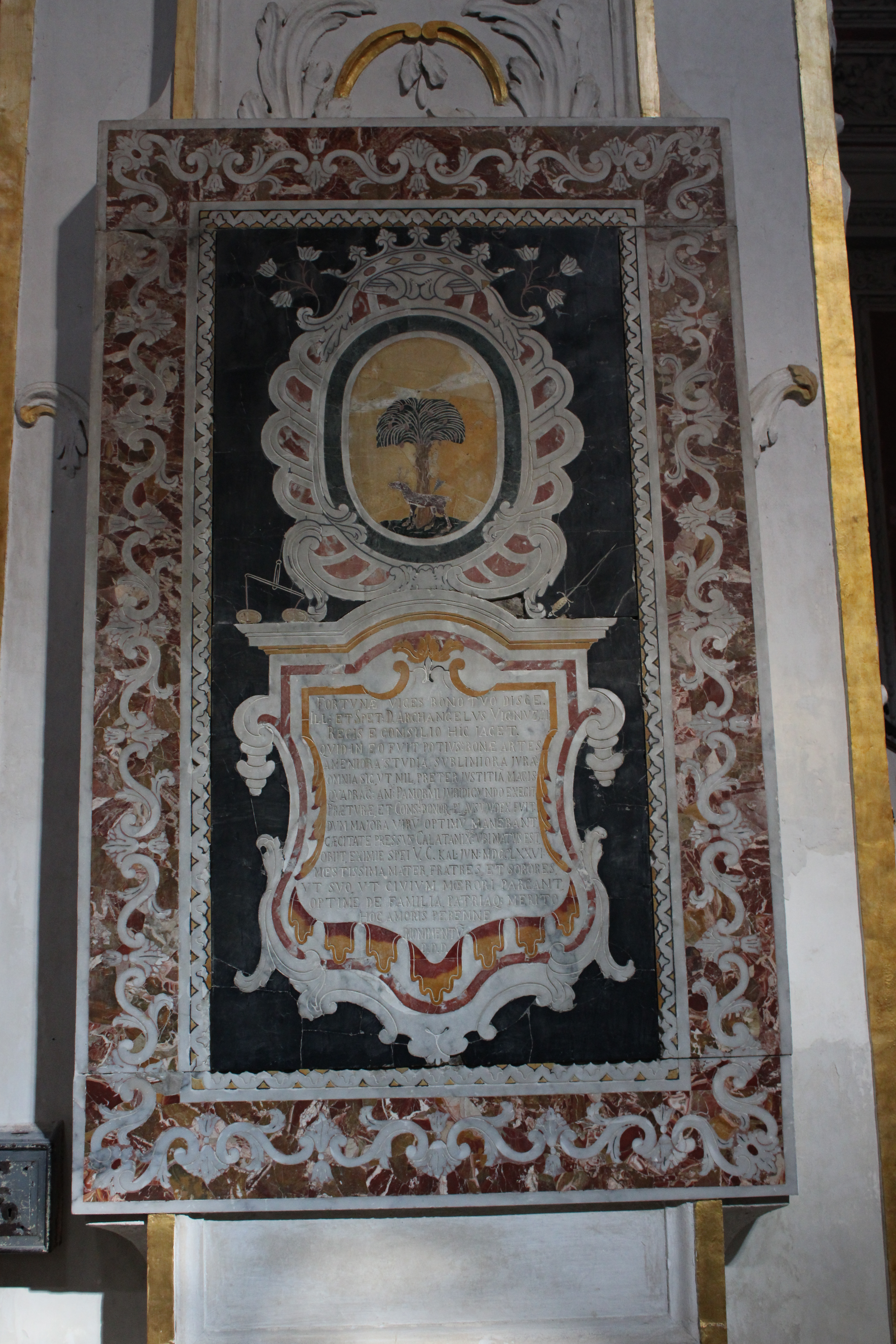
Commemorative inscription to Arcangelo Vignuzzi

- Jesus the Redeemer Chapel:

The statue of the Redeemer is placed on a marble altar in the center of this chapel, a work dated 1914 by the Lecce artist Giuseppe Malecore. This statue is still carried in procession today. On the left wall is a painting depicting the fourth bishop of the Diocese of Caltanissetta, Monsignor Antonio Augusto Intreccialagli, by the Sancataldese painter Carmelo Giunta, created in 1927. On the right wall is the sepulchral monument of Bishop Monsignor Giovanni Iacono. Since September 28, 2019, his mortal remains, transferred from the Cathedral of Ragusa at the request of Bishop Monsignor Mario Russotto, are also housed in a sarcophagus. The balustrade was a gift from an archdeacon in 1931.

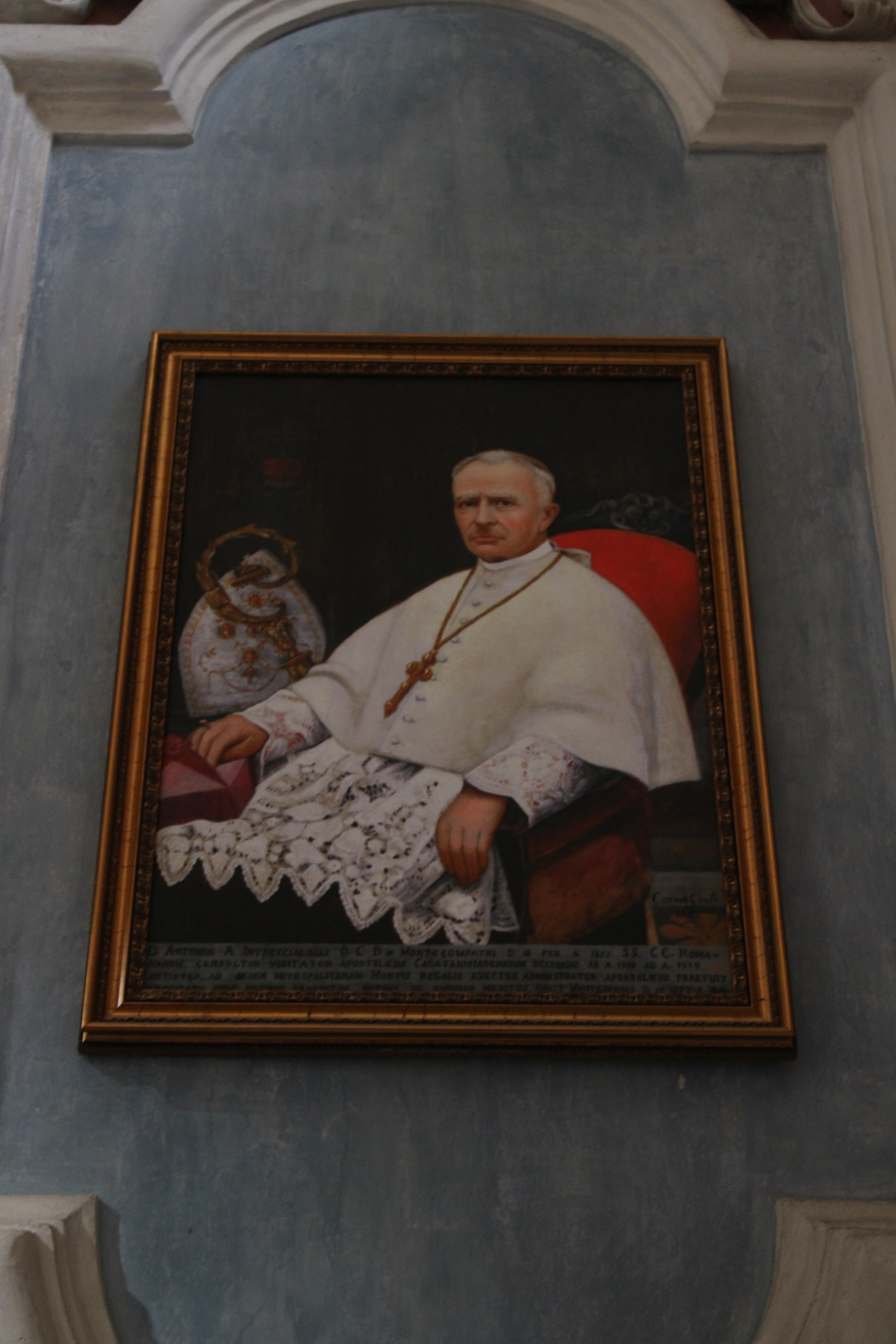
Portrait of Mons. Antonio Augusto Intreccialagli

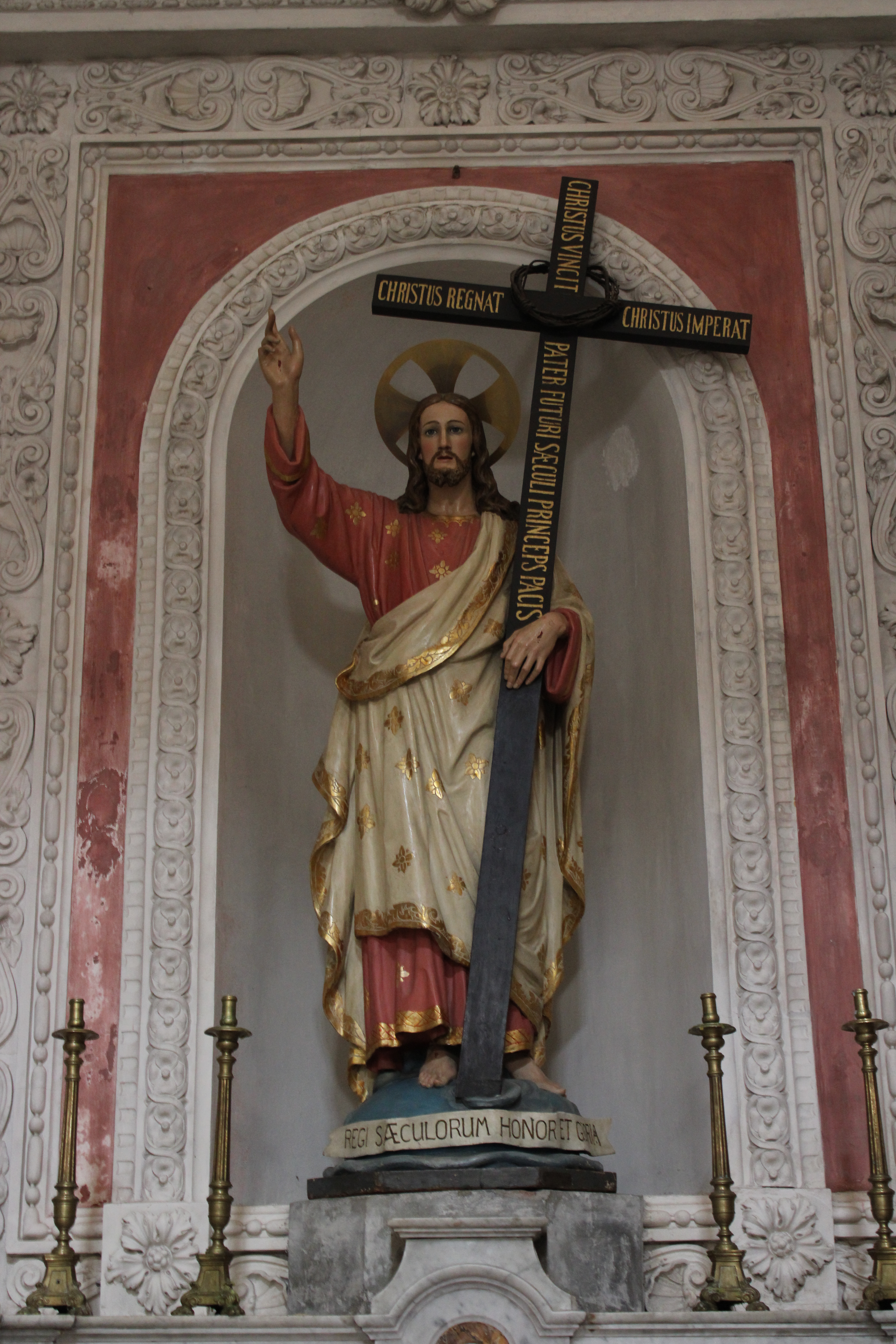
Jesus the Redeemer

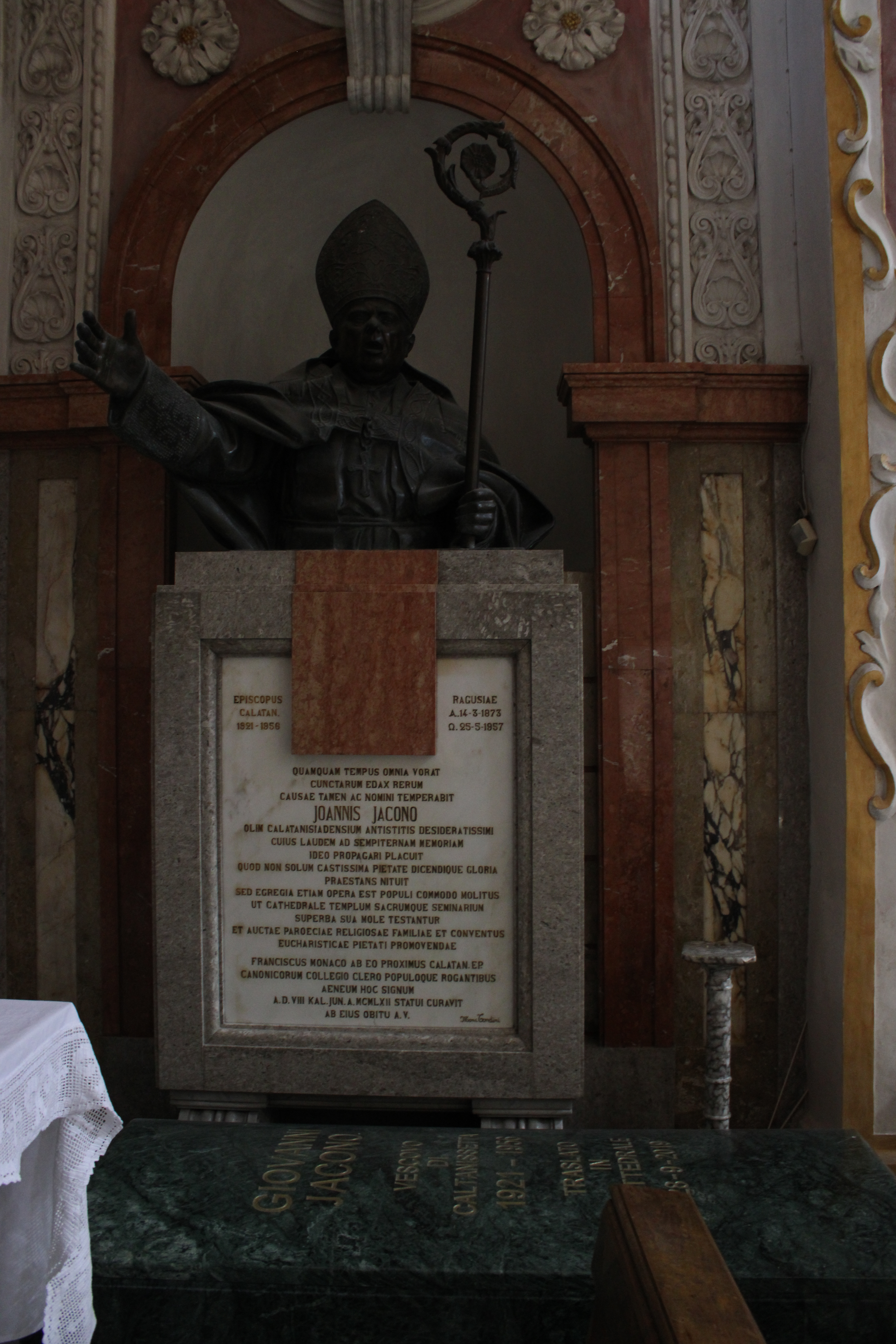
Sepulchre of Mons. Giovanni Iacono
- Saint Stephen Chapel:

In the chapel dedicated to Saint Stephen, a large painting by Vincenzo Roggeri is placed at the center, depicting the moment of the saint's stoning, where he sees the heavens open and the Trinity preparing to crown him. Around him are various figures collecting and throwing stones. On the right is the sepulchral monument of Monsignor Giovanni Rizzo, Bishop of Rossano.

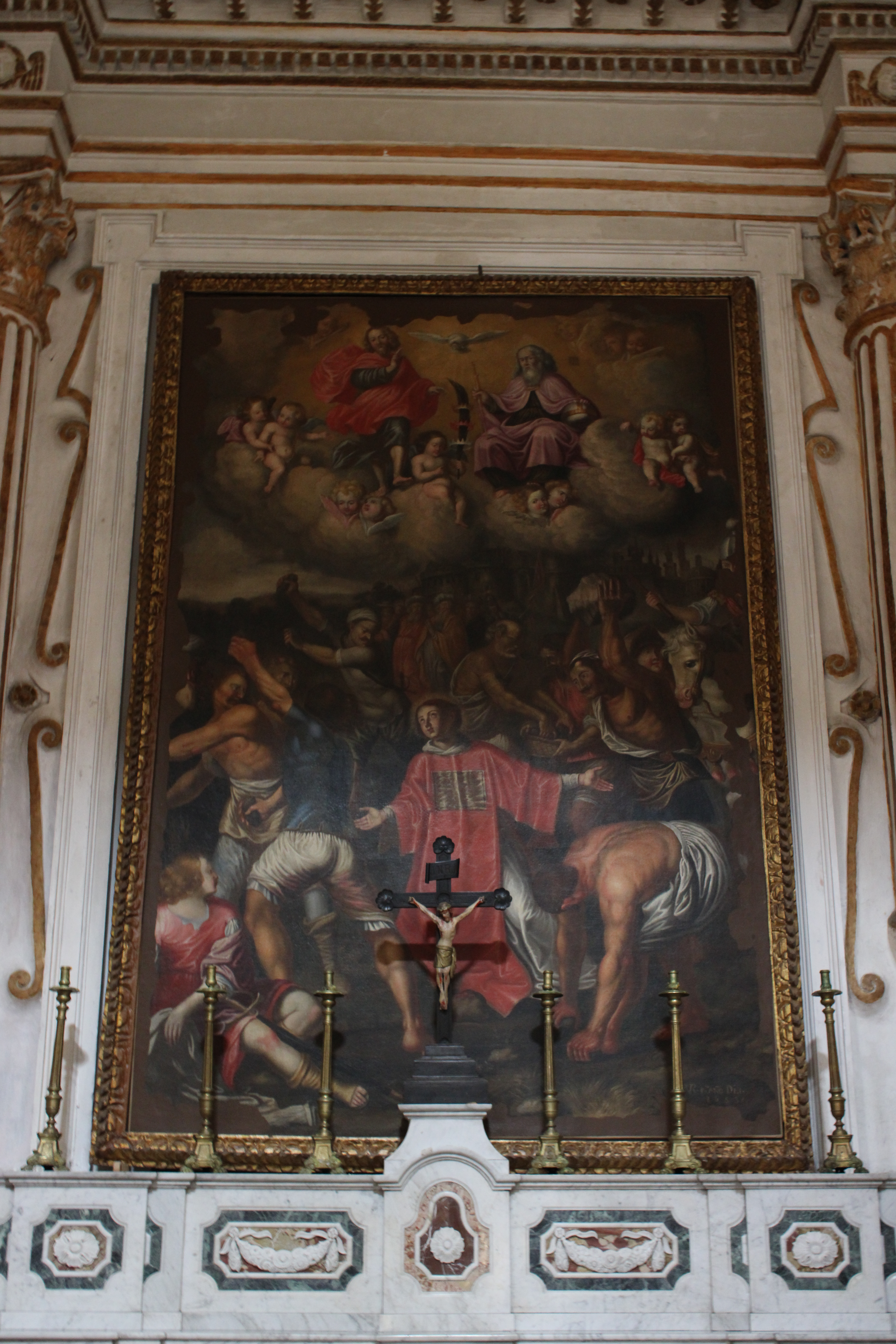
Saint Stephen by Roggeri

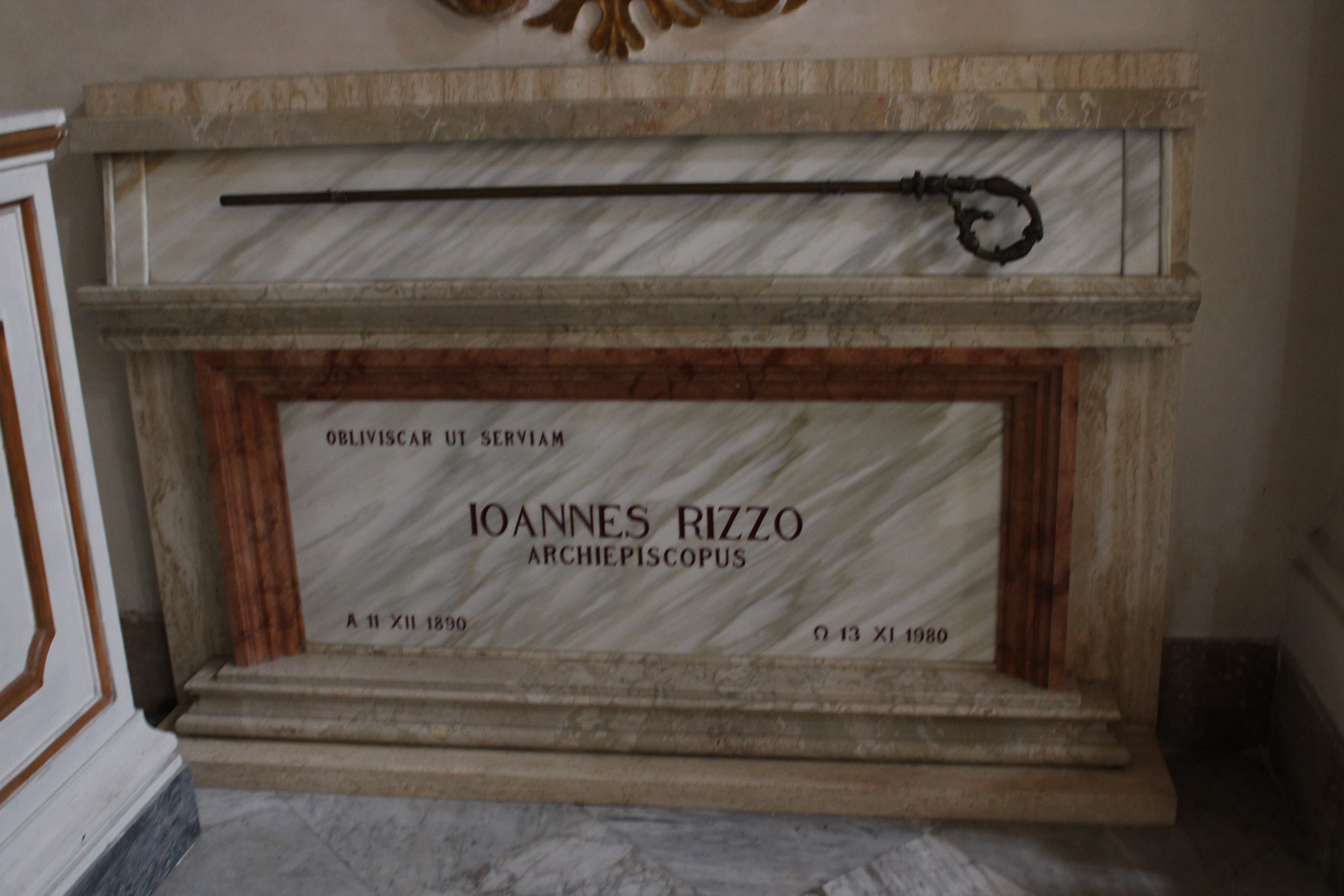
Sepulchre of Giovanni Rizzo
- Saint Anne Chapel:

The last chapel in the left nave, before the transept, is dedicated to Saint Anne. It features a painting by Vincenzo Roggeri, in which the Virgin holds the Child Jesus on her lap, to whom Saint Anne offers a cherry from a basket carried by a putto. On either side are depictions of Saint Joseph and Saint Joachim. On the right wall is the sepulchral monument of Bishop Monsignor Francesco Monaco, and above it is a painting of a friar. On the right wall is a painting by an unknown 18th-century artist depicting Father Antonio Bellavia at the moment of his martyrdom.

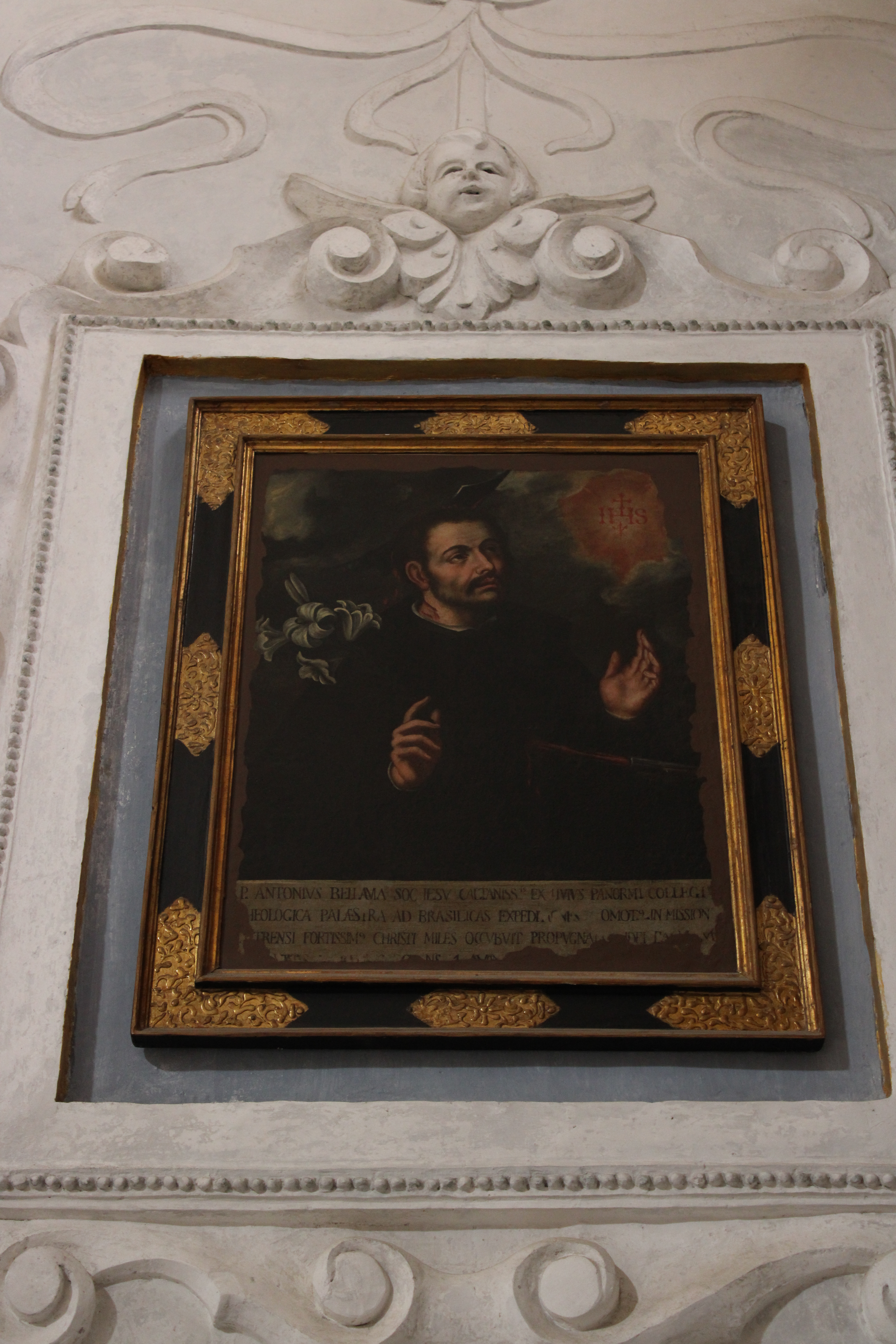
Portrait of Father Antonio Bellavia

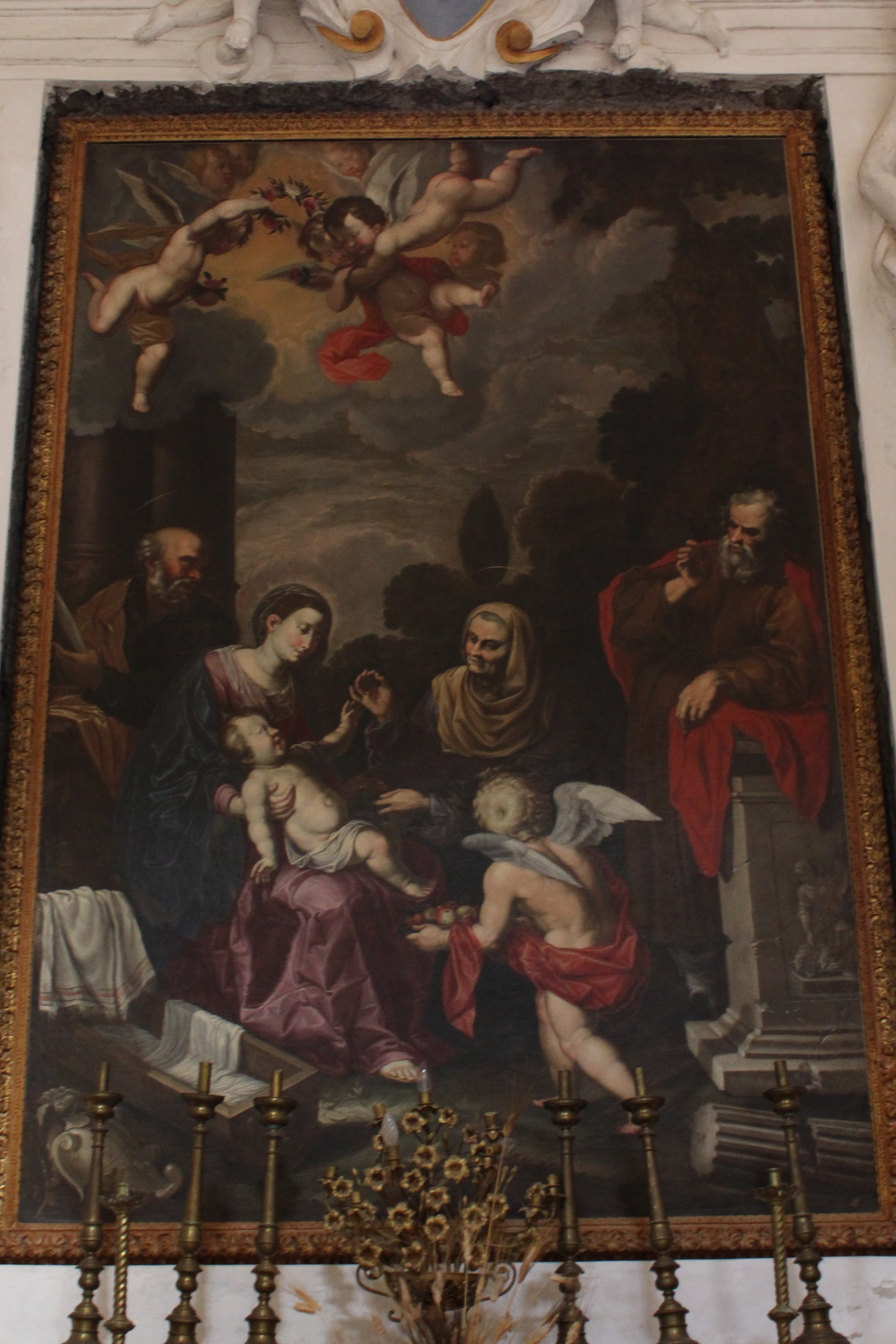
Holy Family by Roggeri

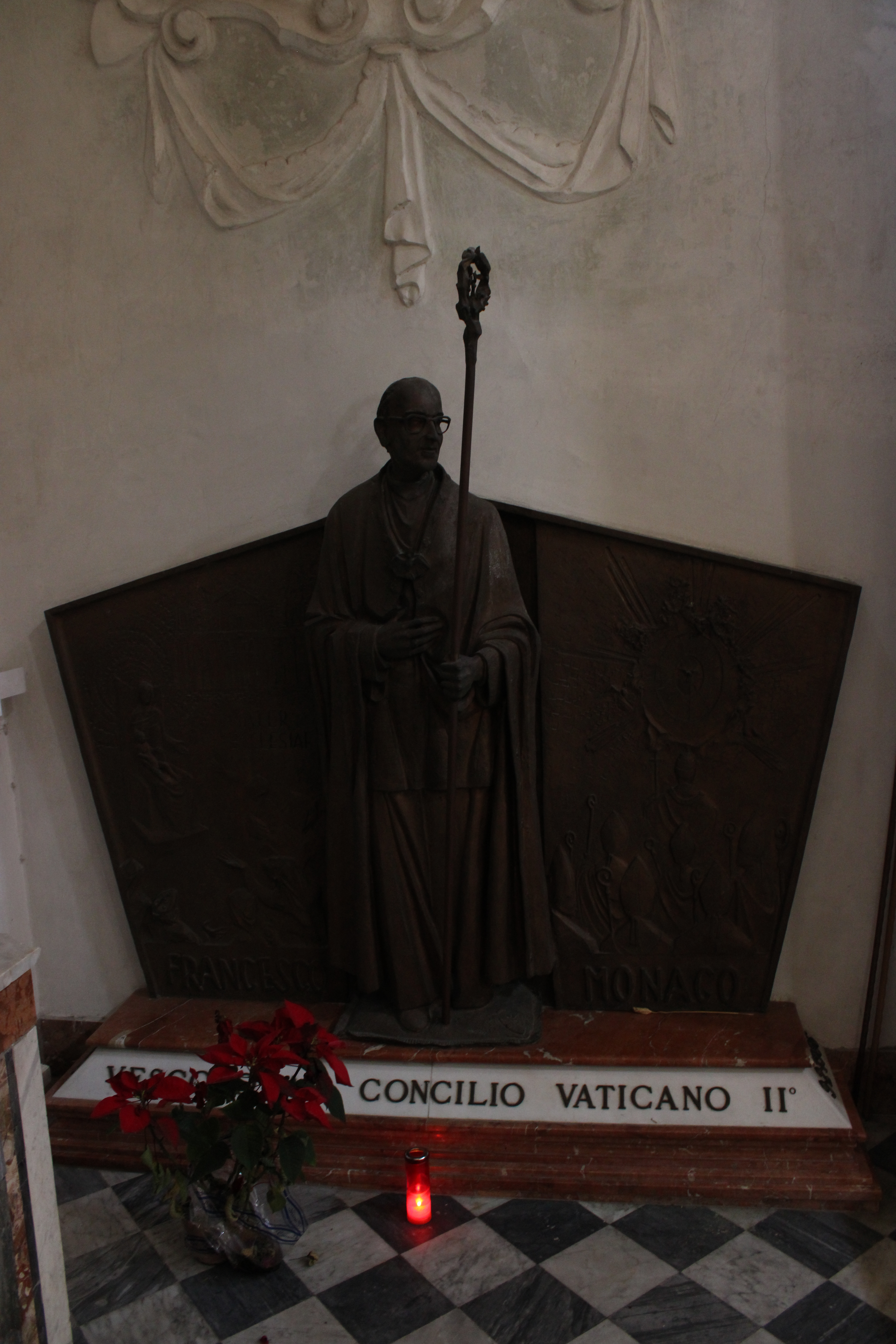
Sepulchre of Mons. Francesco Monaco

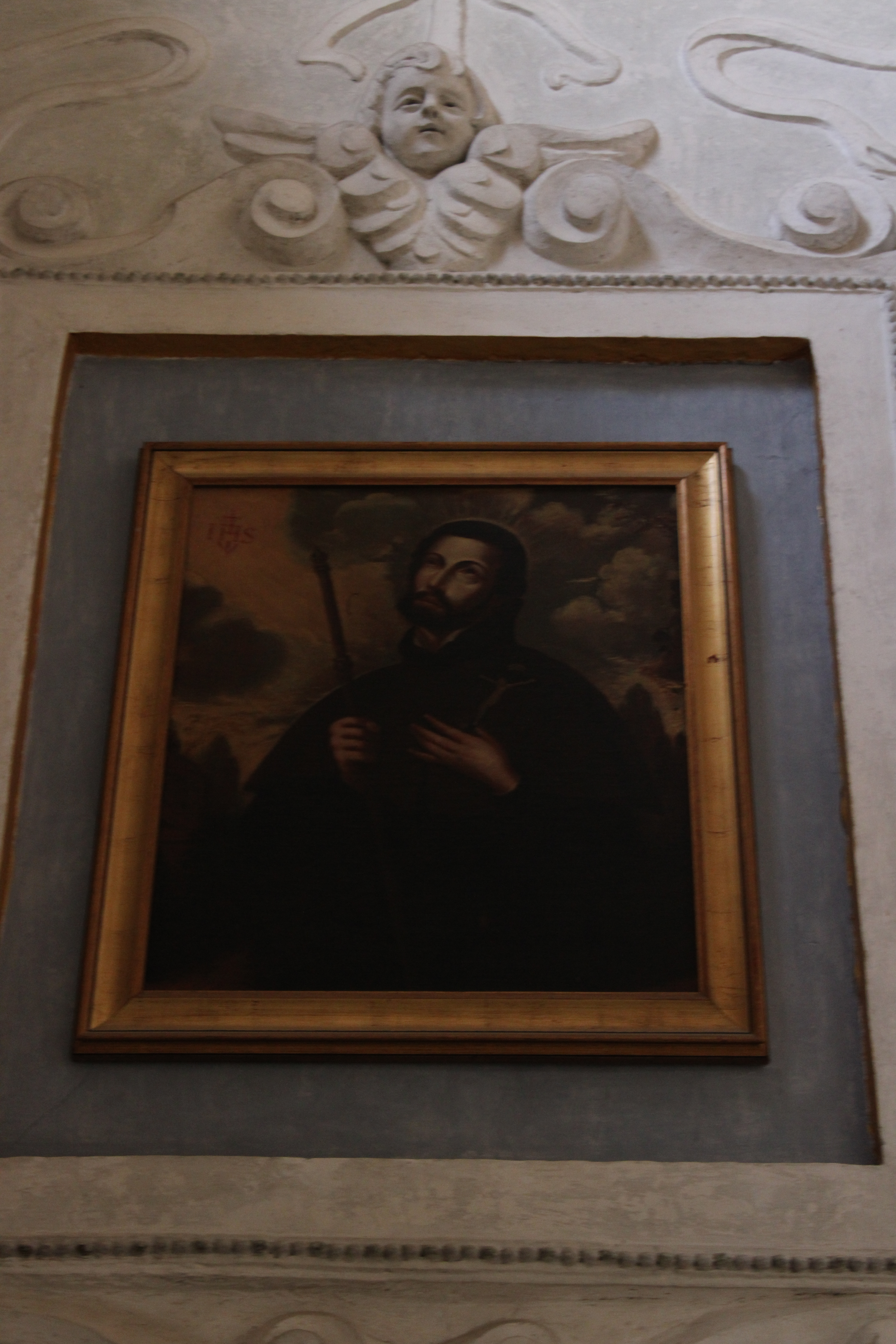
Portrait of a friar
- Sacred Heart of Jesus Chapel:

After the transept, the last chapel in the left nave is dedicated to the Sacred Heart of Jesus, which housed the Blessed Sacrament until 2002. On May 10, 1993, during a pastoral visit by Pope John Paul II to the Diocese of Caltanissetta, the pontiff prayed in this chapel. To commemorate the event, a statue of the saint, donated by artist Martin Emschermann, was placed here in 2019. On the right wall is a commemorative plaque. The chapel's decorations date to the 1960s, during the tenure of Monsignor Giovanni Magrì. This chapel is also called the "Divine Mercy Chapel" in honor of the feast established by the same pontiff who visited the city years earlier.

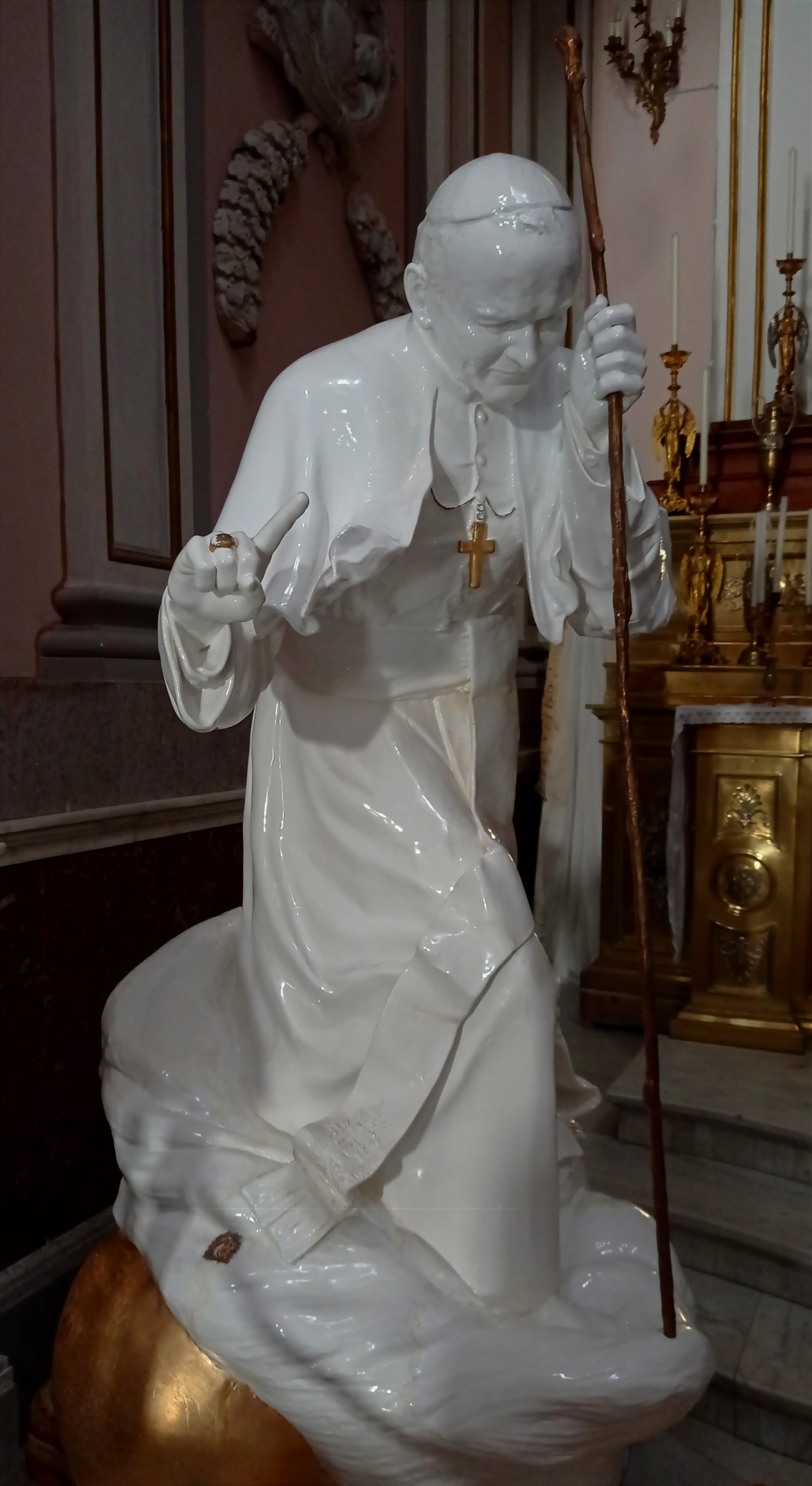
Statue of Pope John Paul II

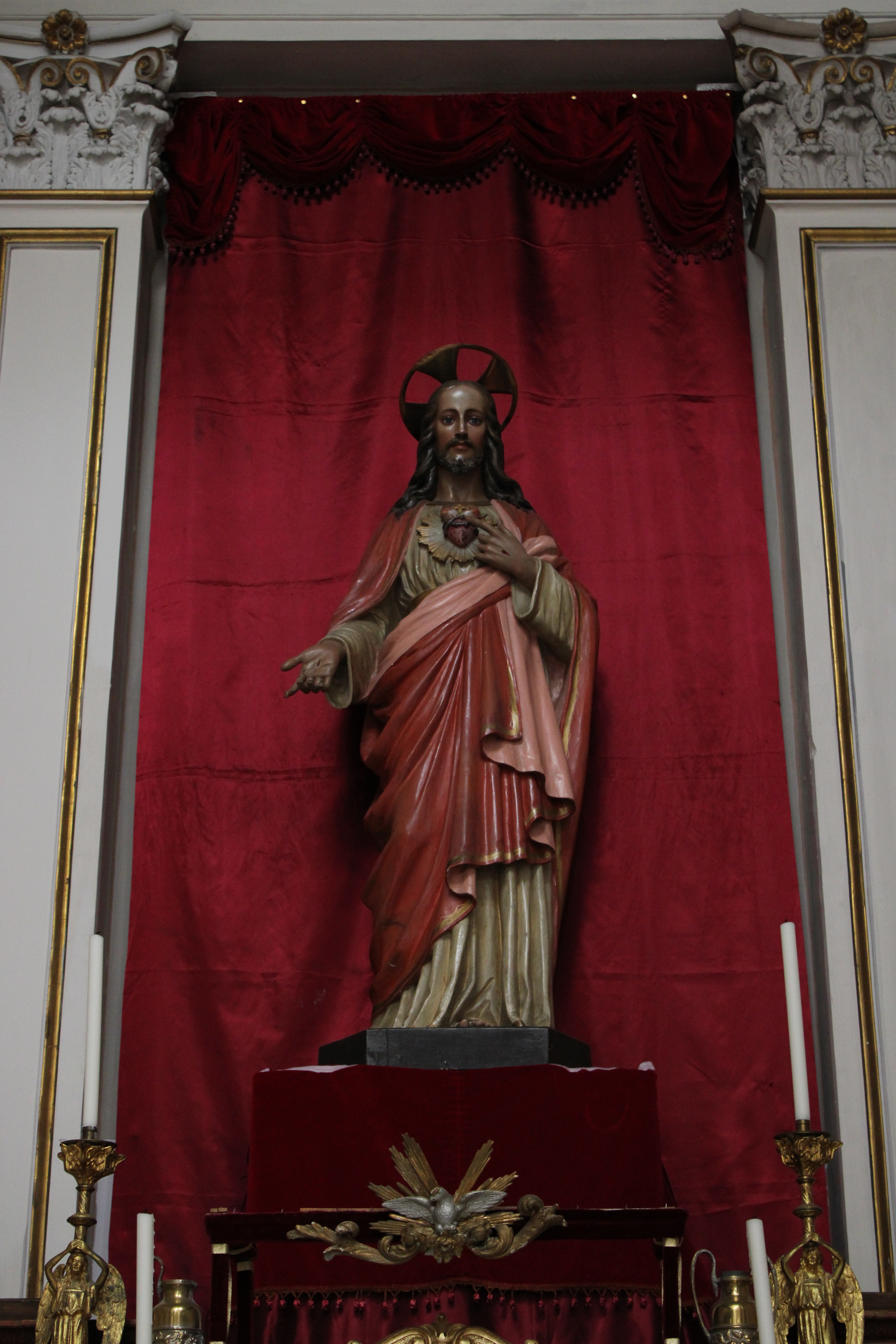
Sacred Heart of Jesus

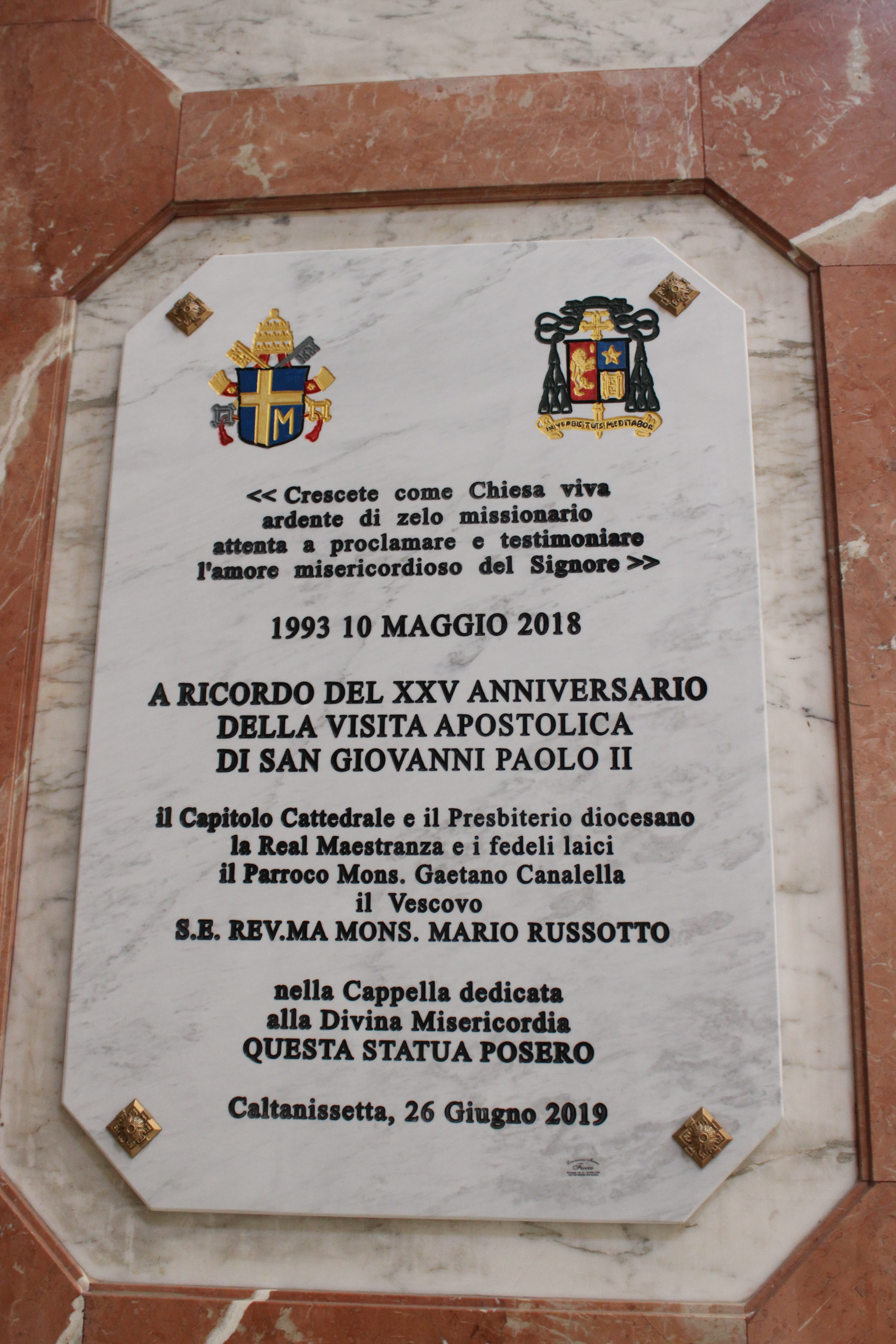
Commemorative plaque

=== Right nave ===
- Baptistery Chapel:

The right nave begins with the chapel housing the baptismal font. Above, on the central wall, is a work by Jusepe de Ribera. The baptismal font was created in 1740 at the expense of parish priest Agostino Riva.

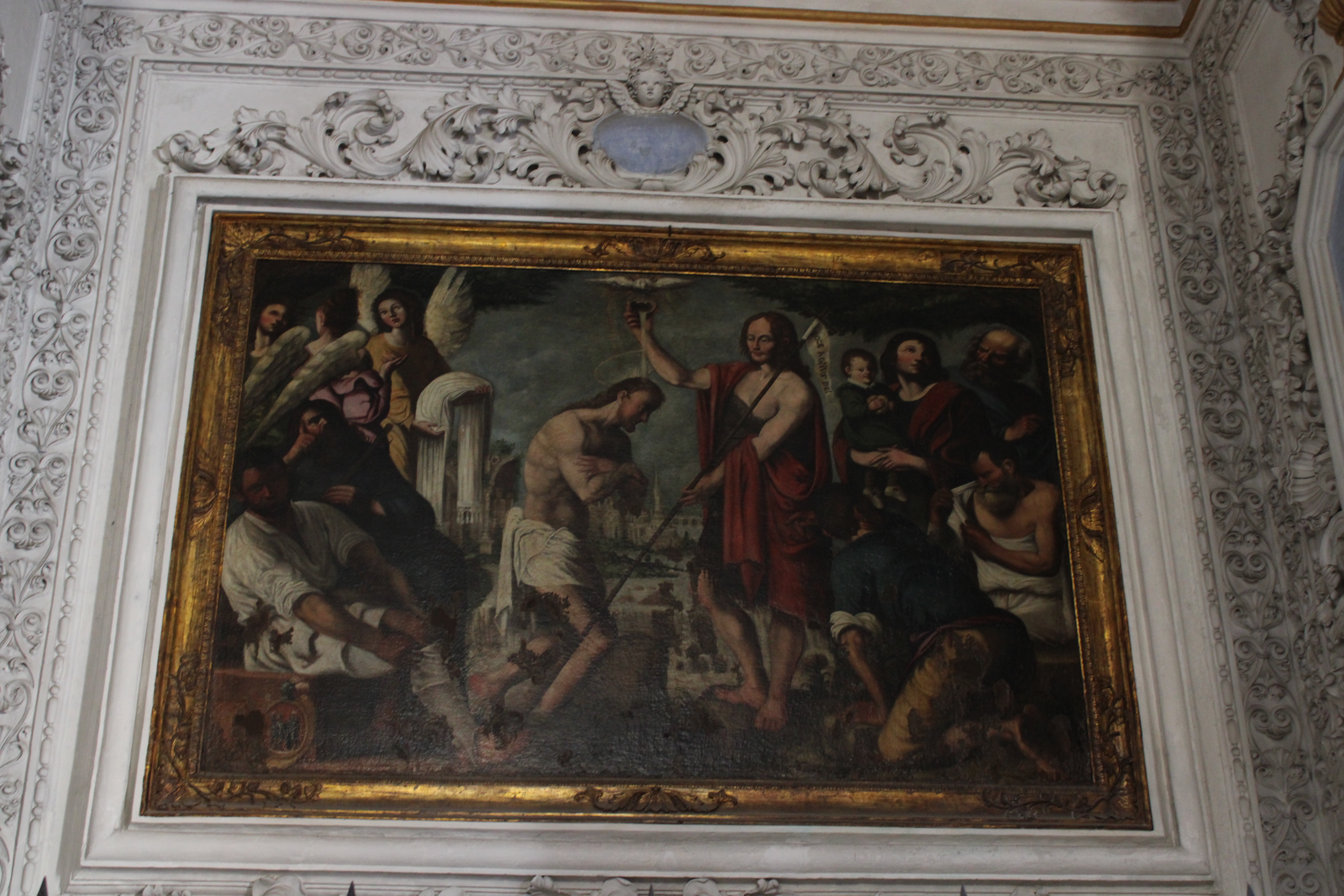
Baptism of Jesus

- Immaculate Conception Chapel:

This chapel houses the statue of the Immaculate Conception, by Antonio Lacerda, dated 1760, placed on a marble altar at the center. On the right wall is the sepulchral monument of the first bishop of the Diocese of Caltanissetta, Monsignor Antonino Maria Stromillo, a work by the Palermitan Biagio Marino. On the left are the remains of Bishop Monsignor Baldassare Leone, who died in Caltanissetta during a pastoral visit.

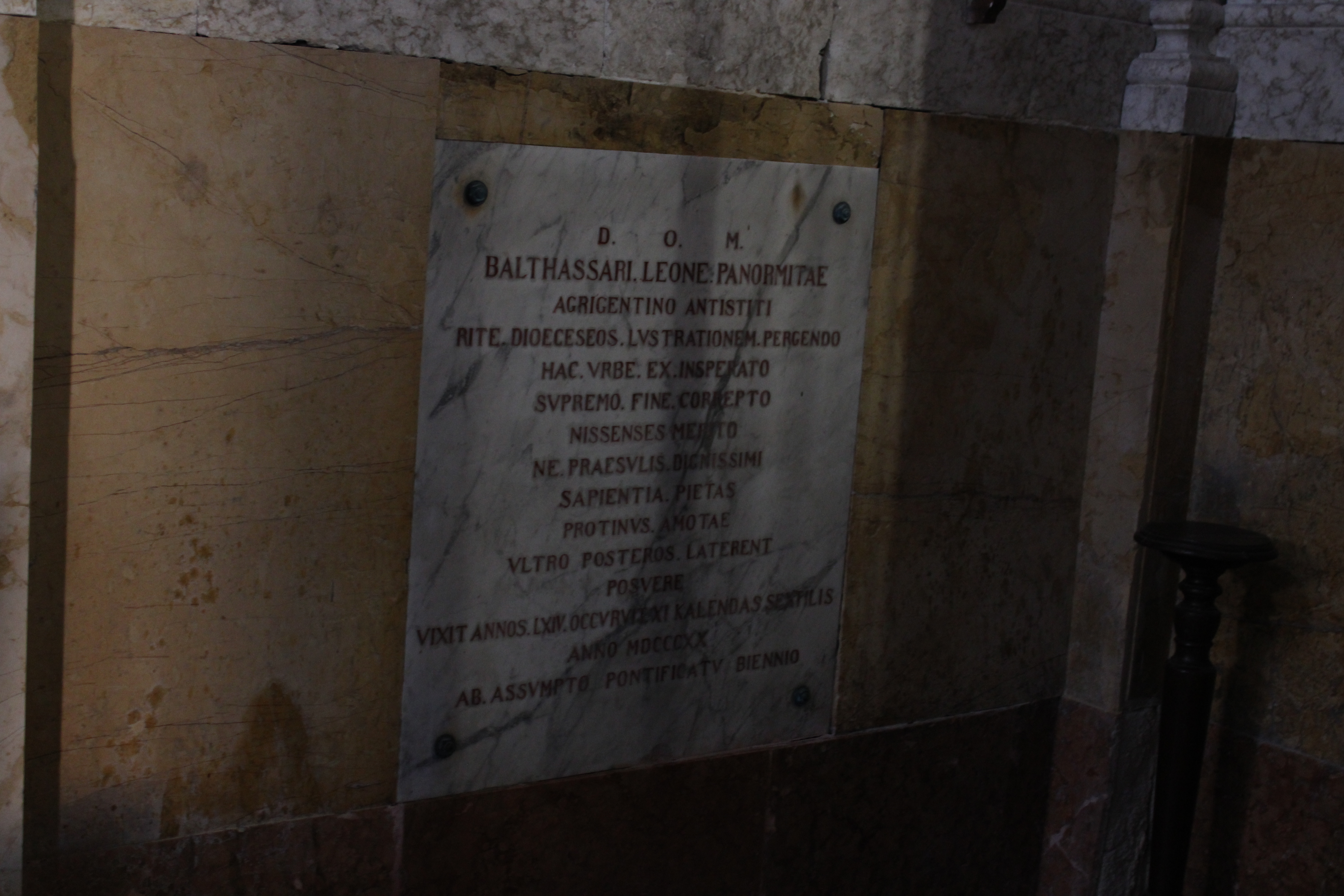
Sepulchre of Baldassare Leone

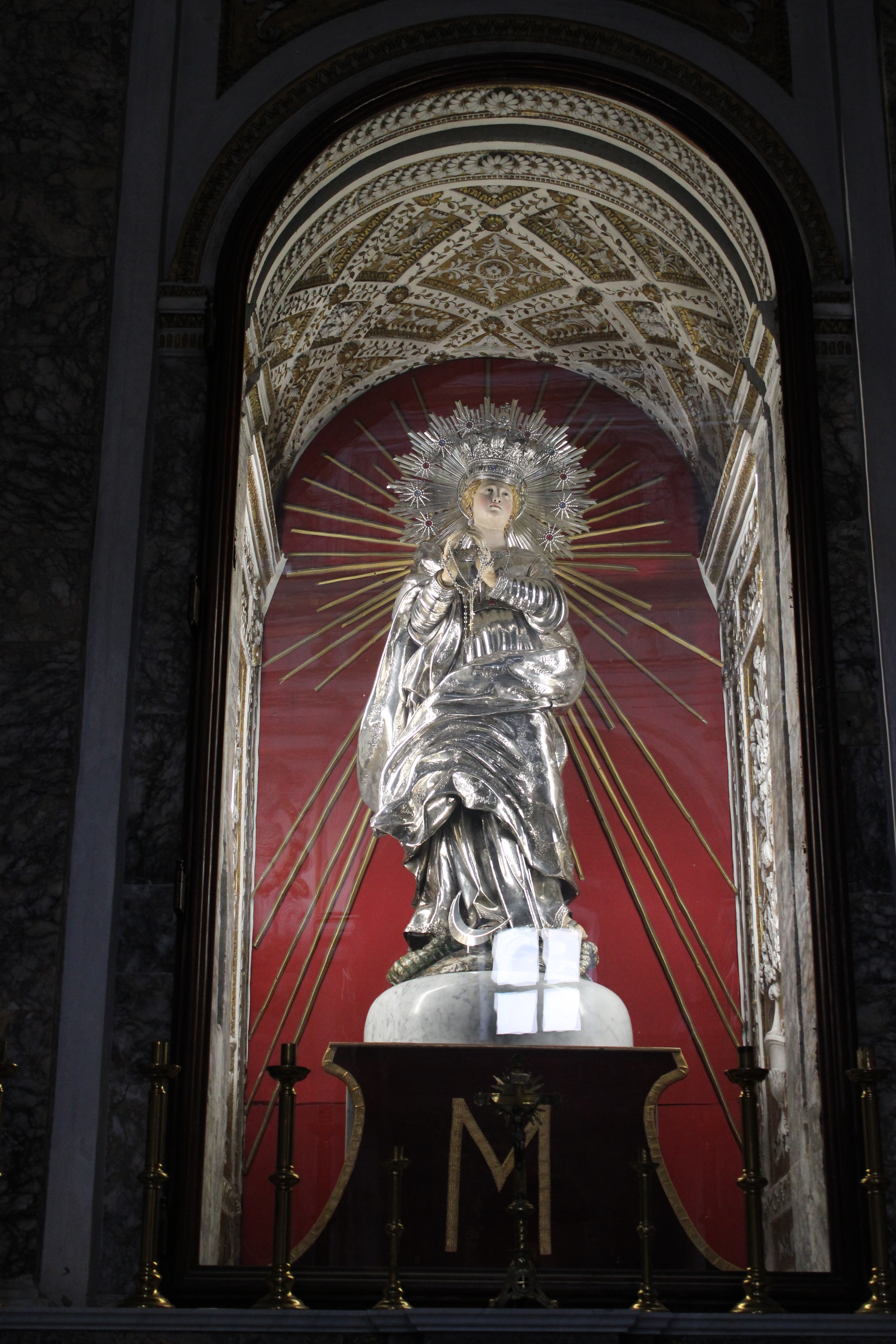
Immaculate Conception

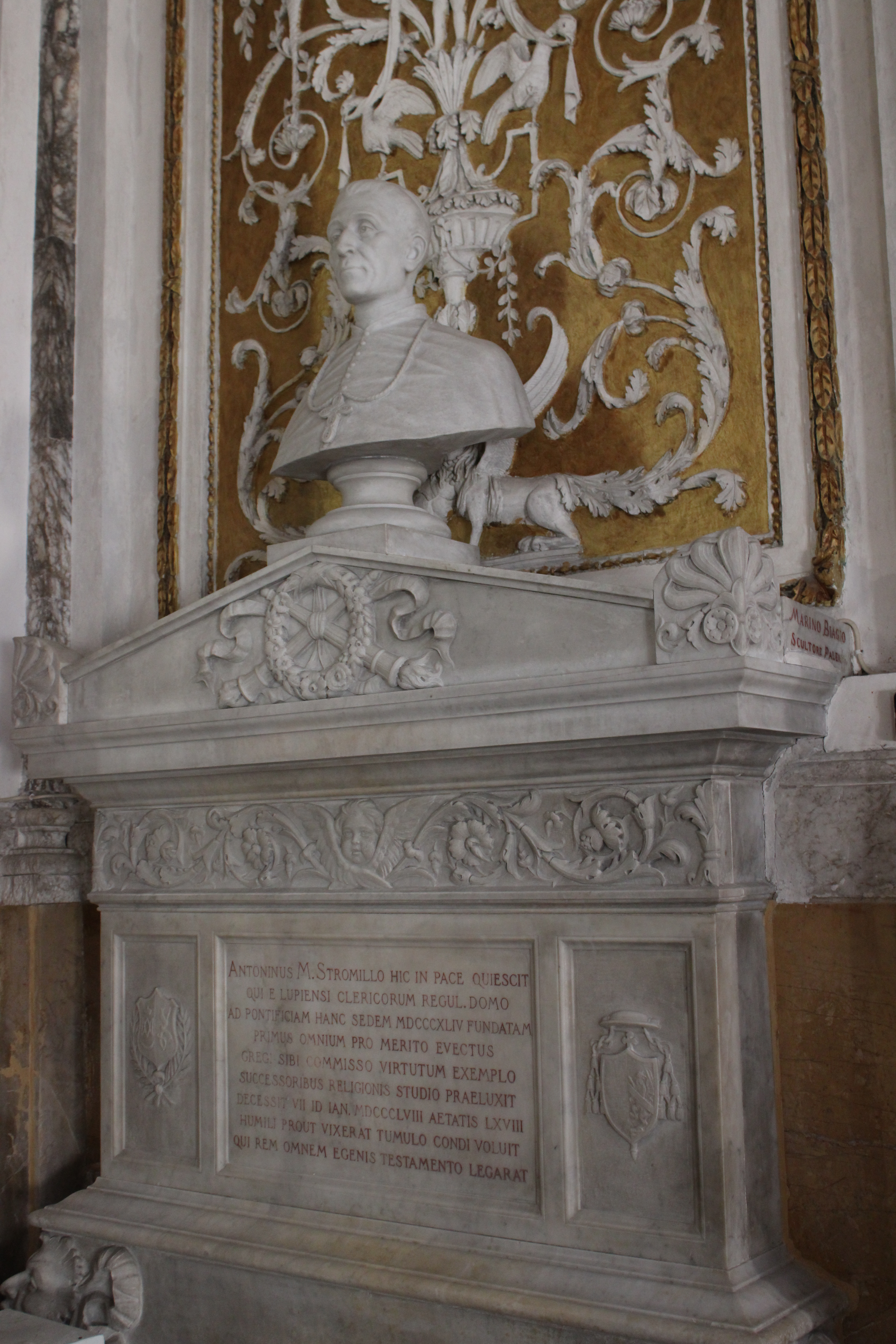
Sepulchre of Mons. Antonino Maria Stromillo
- Holy Urn Chapel:

This chapel contains one of the sixteen "vare" that process through the streets of Caltanissetta on Holy Thursday night. A work from 1892 by the Neapolitan sculptor Francesco Biangardi, many consider the angel surmounting the statue to be among the most beautiful in Sicily.

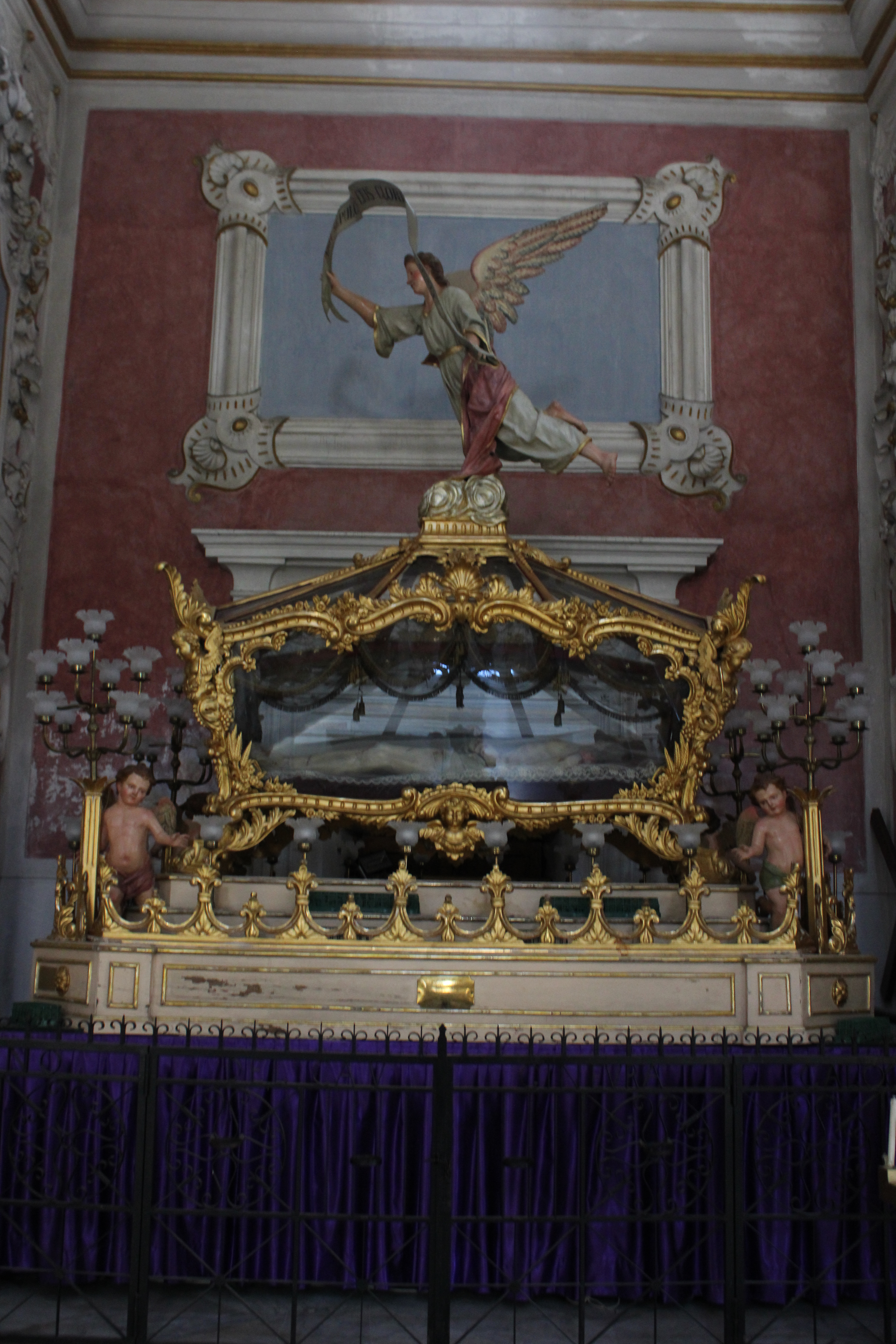
Holy Urn

- Saint Lawrence Chapel:

The chapel features a central painting dedicated to Saint Lawrence: the saint is lying on the gridiron, while one of the executioners on the right is bending to light the fire. In the upper right, a seated figure is about to give the execution order. On the left is a pagan statue on a pedestal. Between them, an angel carries the palm of martyrdom. The work is by Vincenzo Roggeri. On the right wall is the sepulchral monument of Bishop Monsignor Giovanni Guttadauro, a work by Giacomo Scarantino. On the other hand, the left wall houses the flat tombstone of Bishop Ignazio Zuccaro.

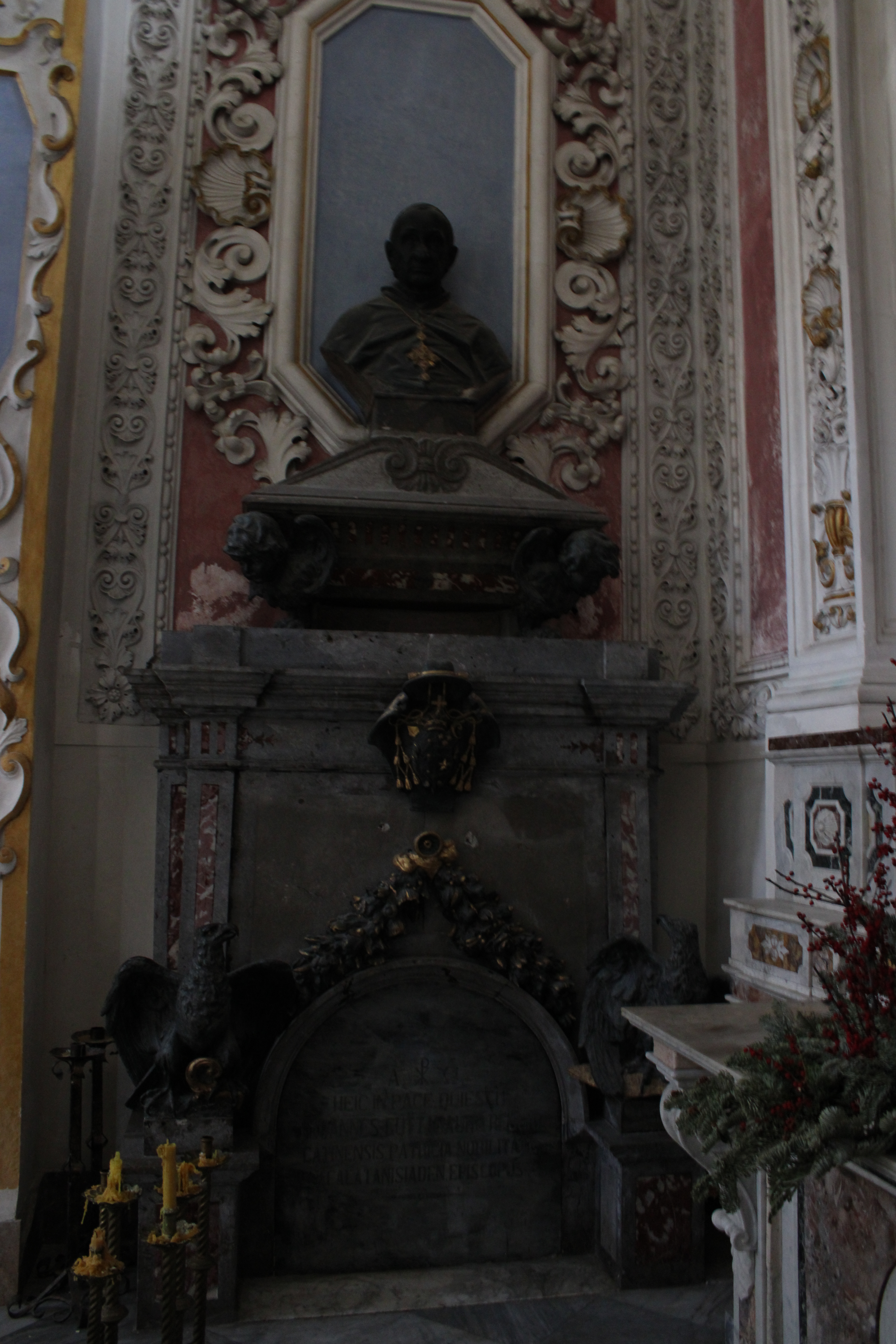
Sepulchral monument of Mons. Giovanni Guttadauro

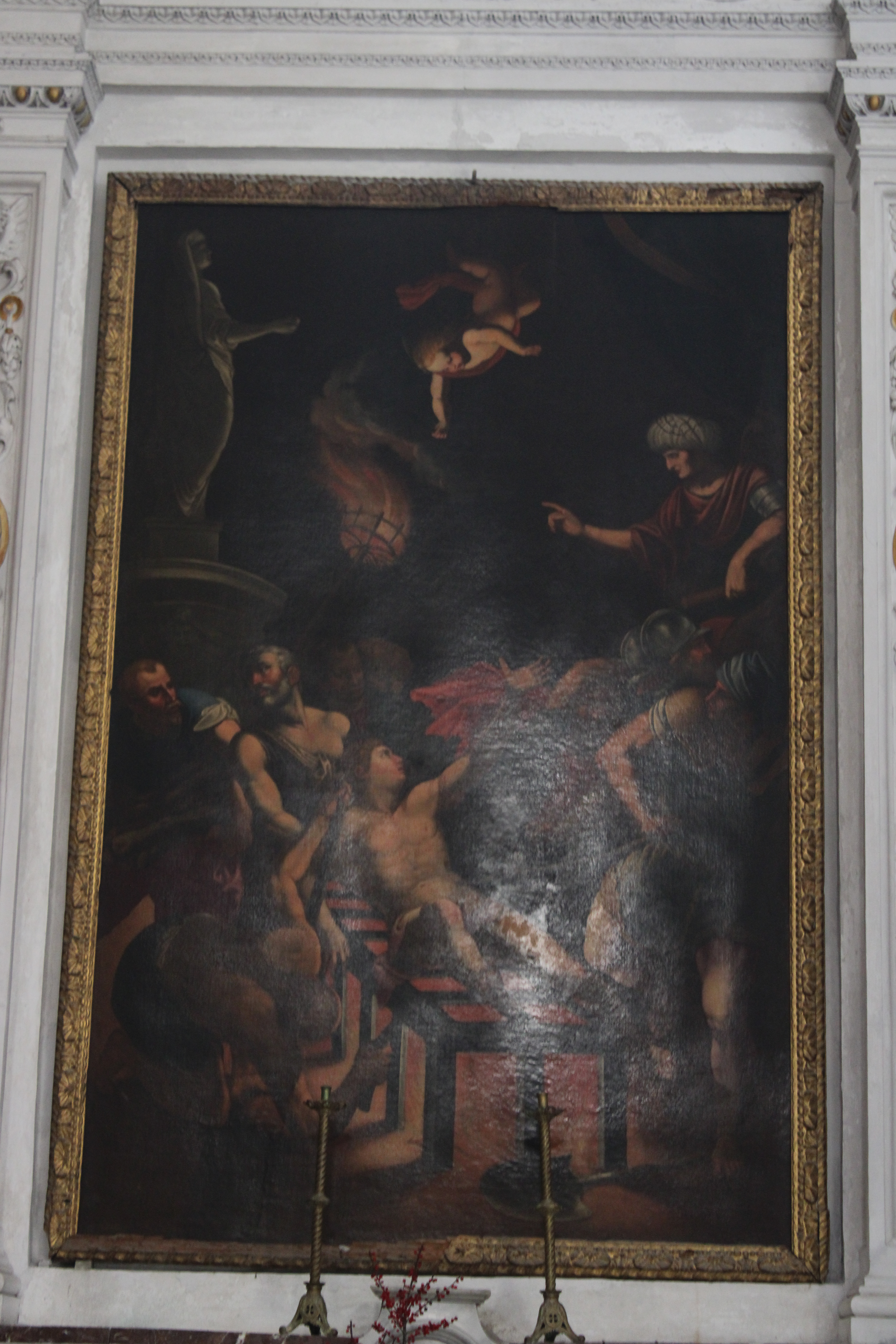
Saint Lawrence by Roggeri

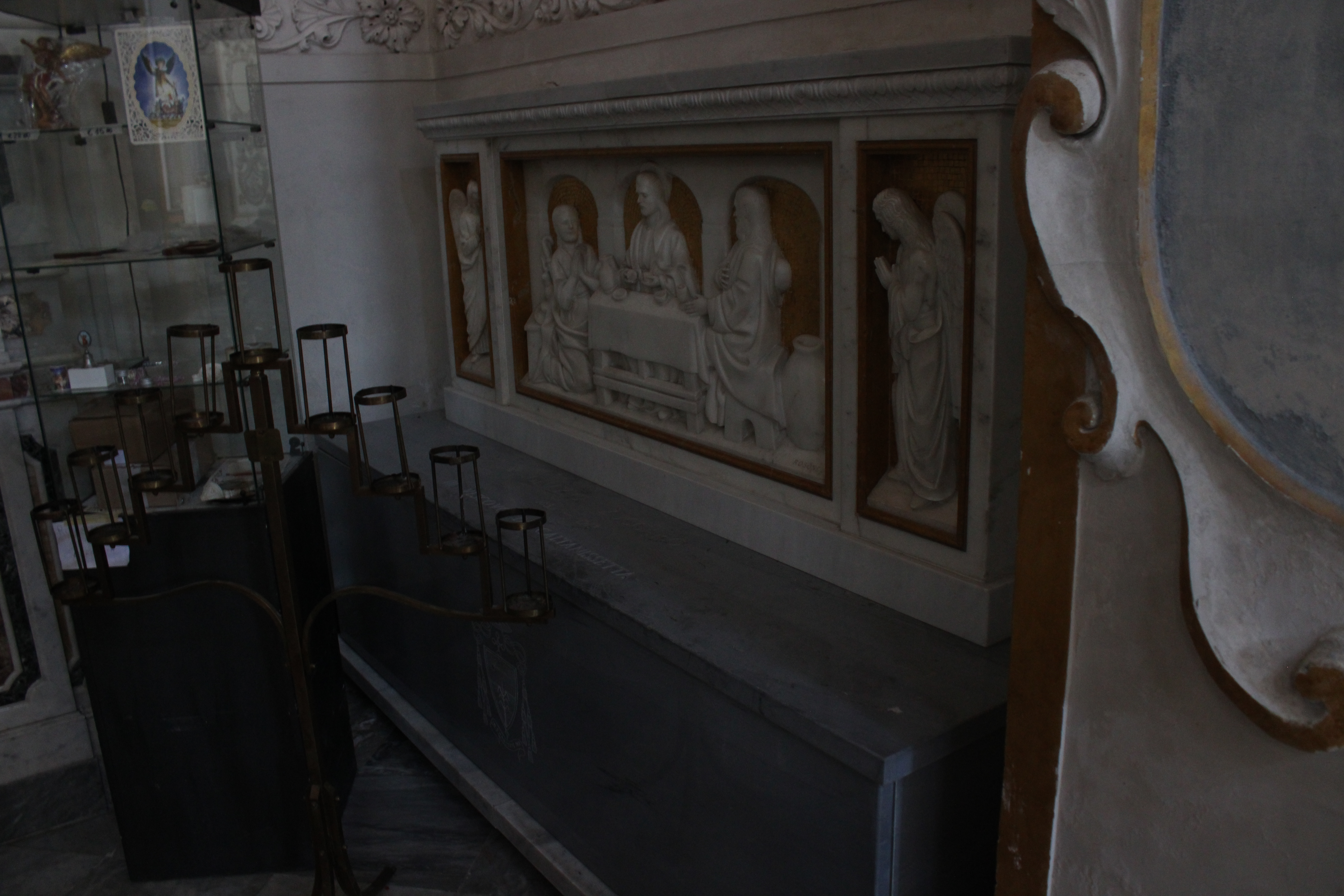
Sepulchre of Ignazio Zuccaro
- Saint Roch Chapel:

Although dedicated to Saint Roch, it contains a statue of Saint Francis of Assisi, a work from 1926 by Michele Caltagirone. The cult of Saint Roch was more prominent in the 17th century; this chapel once housed a statue of the French saint, of which only the head remains, now preserved in the Church of Santo Spirito. On the right wall is a painting depicting the Venerable Angelico Lipani, while on the left wall is a plaque commemorating the seventh centenary of Saint Francis of Assisi's birth.

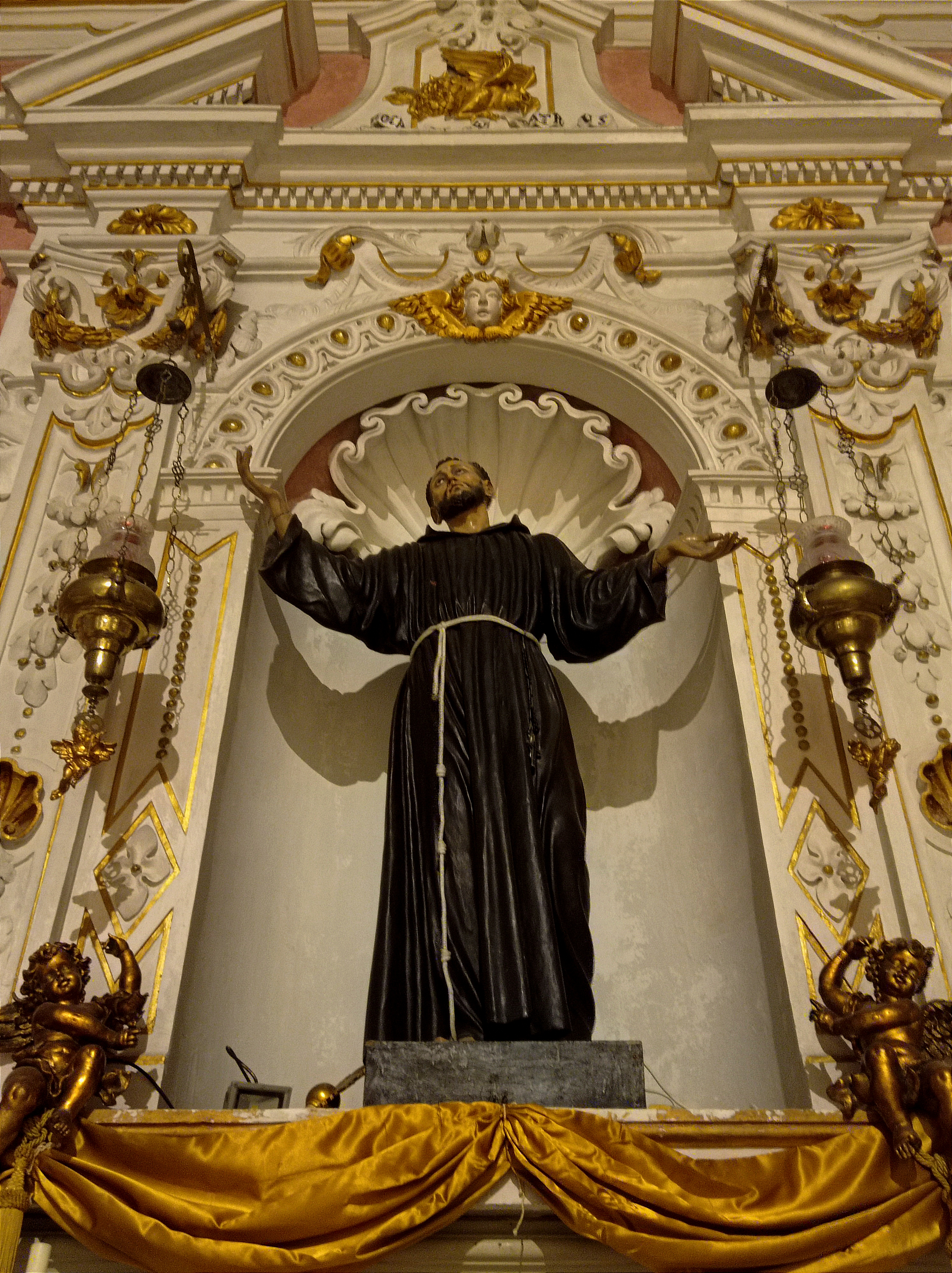
Statue of Saint Francis

- Blessed Sacrament Chapel:

The most recent chapel in the cathedral, inaugurated on June 29, 2006, contains a tabernacle donated by Pope Leo XIII, a work from 1887 by Rosario Pennisi, an artist from Acireale. An identical copy of this tabernacle is located in the Church of San Pietro in Acireale. On the left wall is a plaque commemorating this event. The then-Bishop Monsignor Giovanni Guttadauro, in gratitude to the pontiff, organized a pilgrimage and offered gifts to His Holiness. This pilgrimage was led by the bishop's nephew, Monsignor Giuseppe Francica-Nava. The chapel also contains five paintings by unknown artists. It was once dedicated to the Madonna of the Mountains.

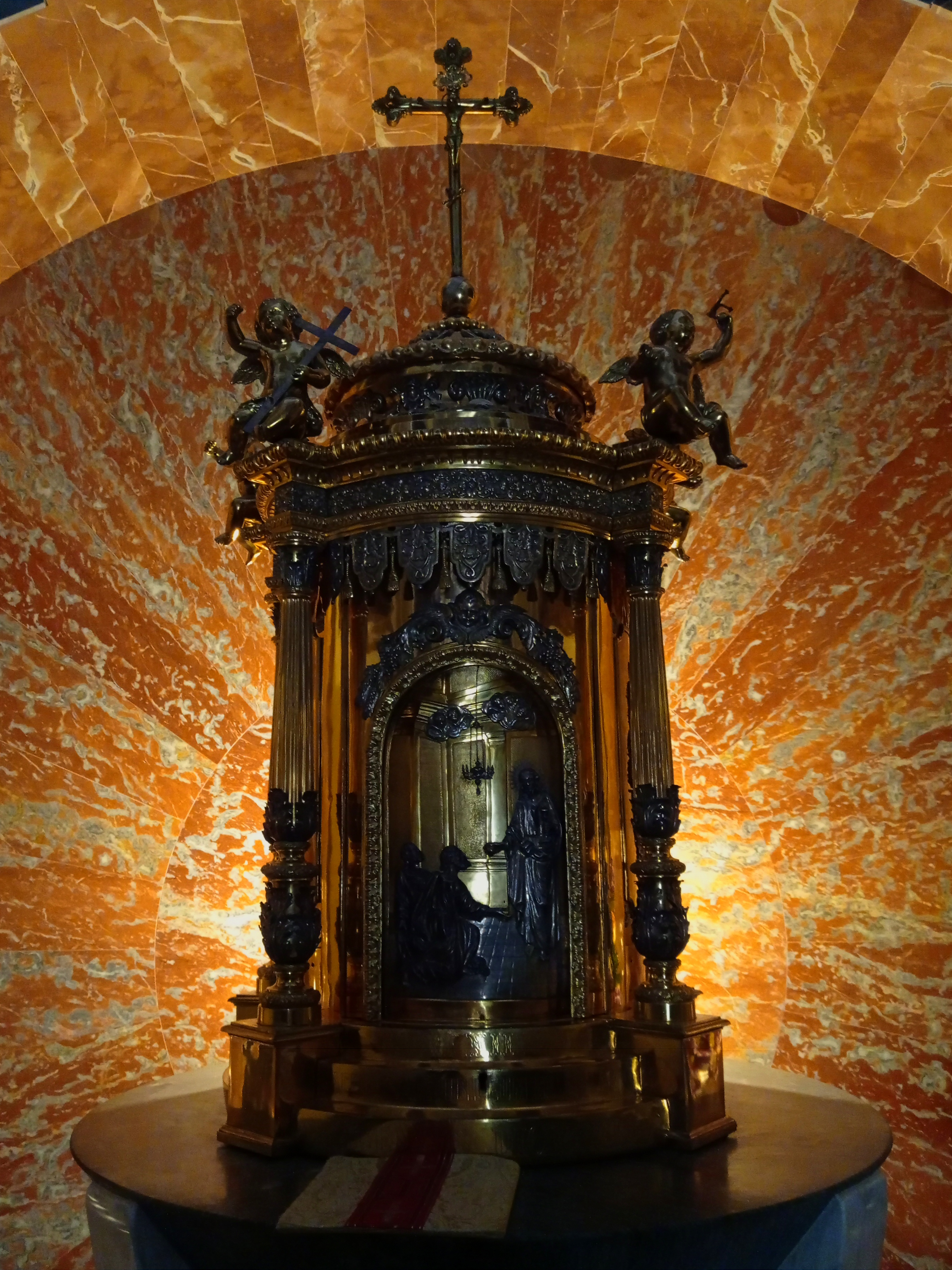
The tabernacle

- Saint Michael Chapel:

Beyond the transept is the last chapel in the right nave, dedicated to the city's patron, Saint Michael. It houses a wooden statue from 1625, a work by the sculptor Stefano Li Volsi from Nicosia. Flanking the niche are the other two archangels, Gabriel and Raphael, crafted by the Palermitan Vincenzo Vitagliano. Below the statue is a marble altar used occasionally for services. Near the Blessed Sacrament chapel is an inscription commemorating the indulgence granted by Pope Clement XIII during the feast days of Saint Michael in 1767.

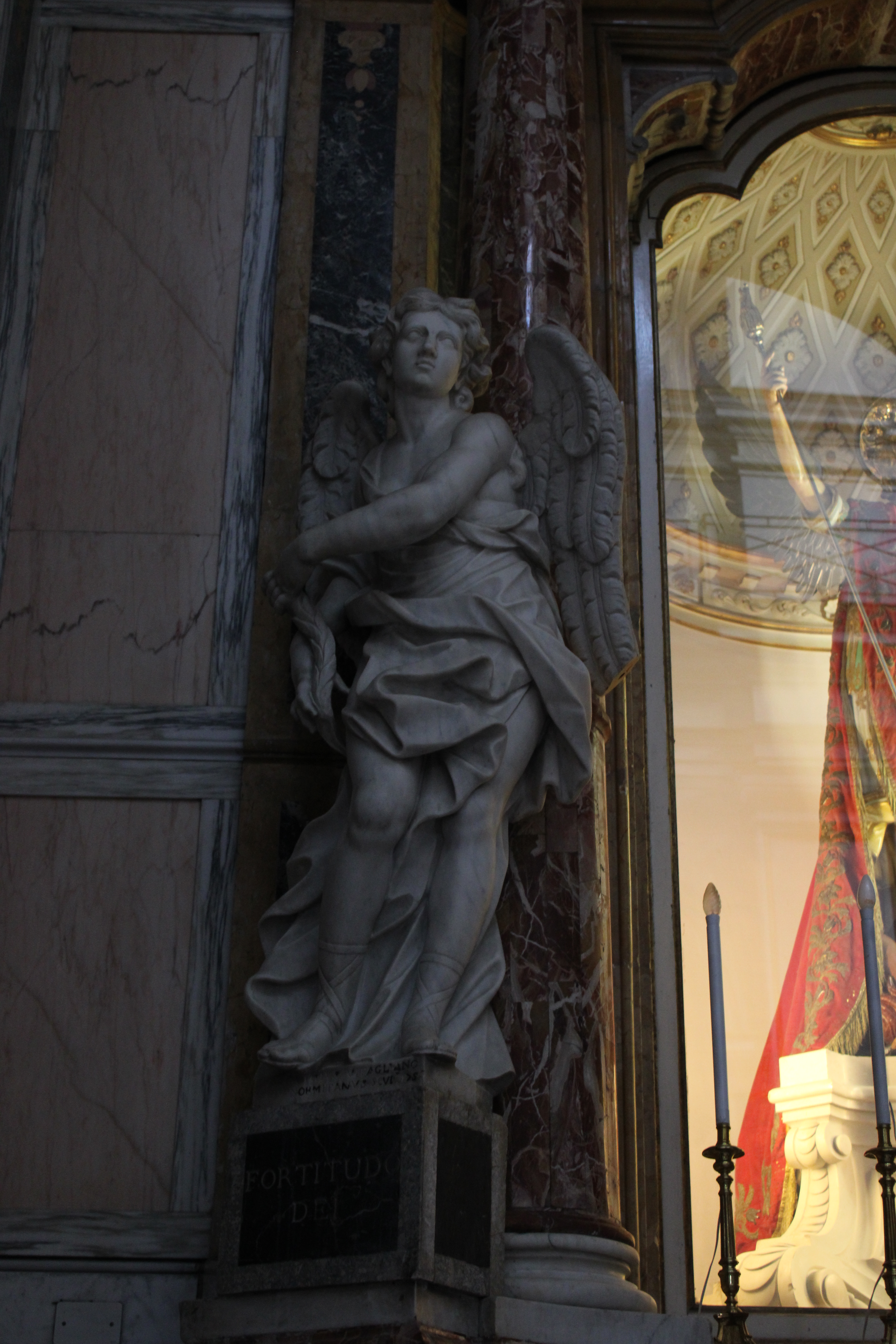
Archangel Raphael

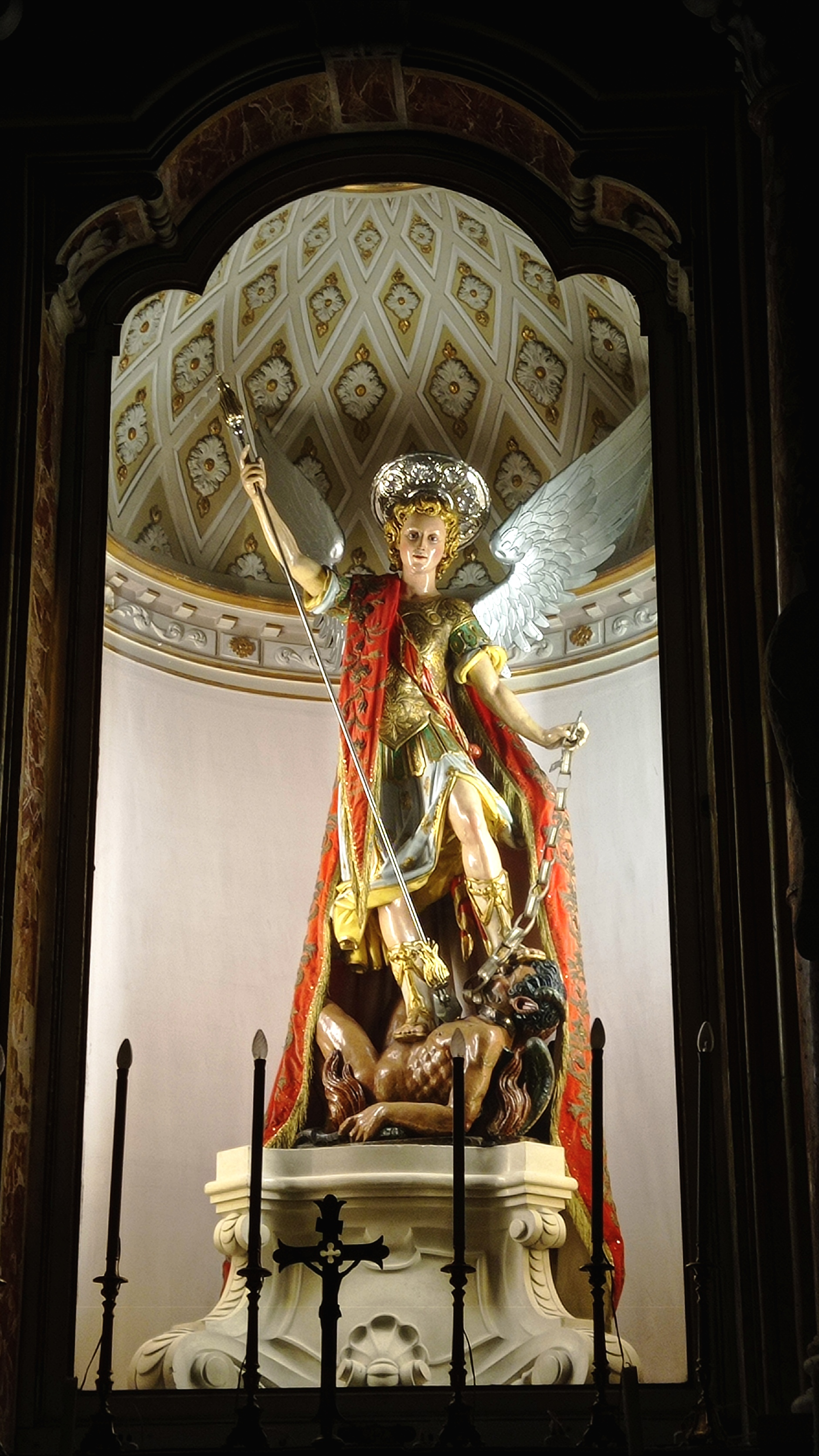
Archangel Michael

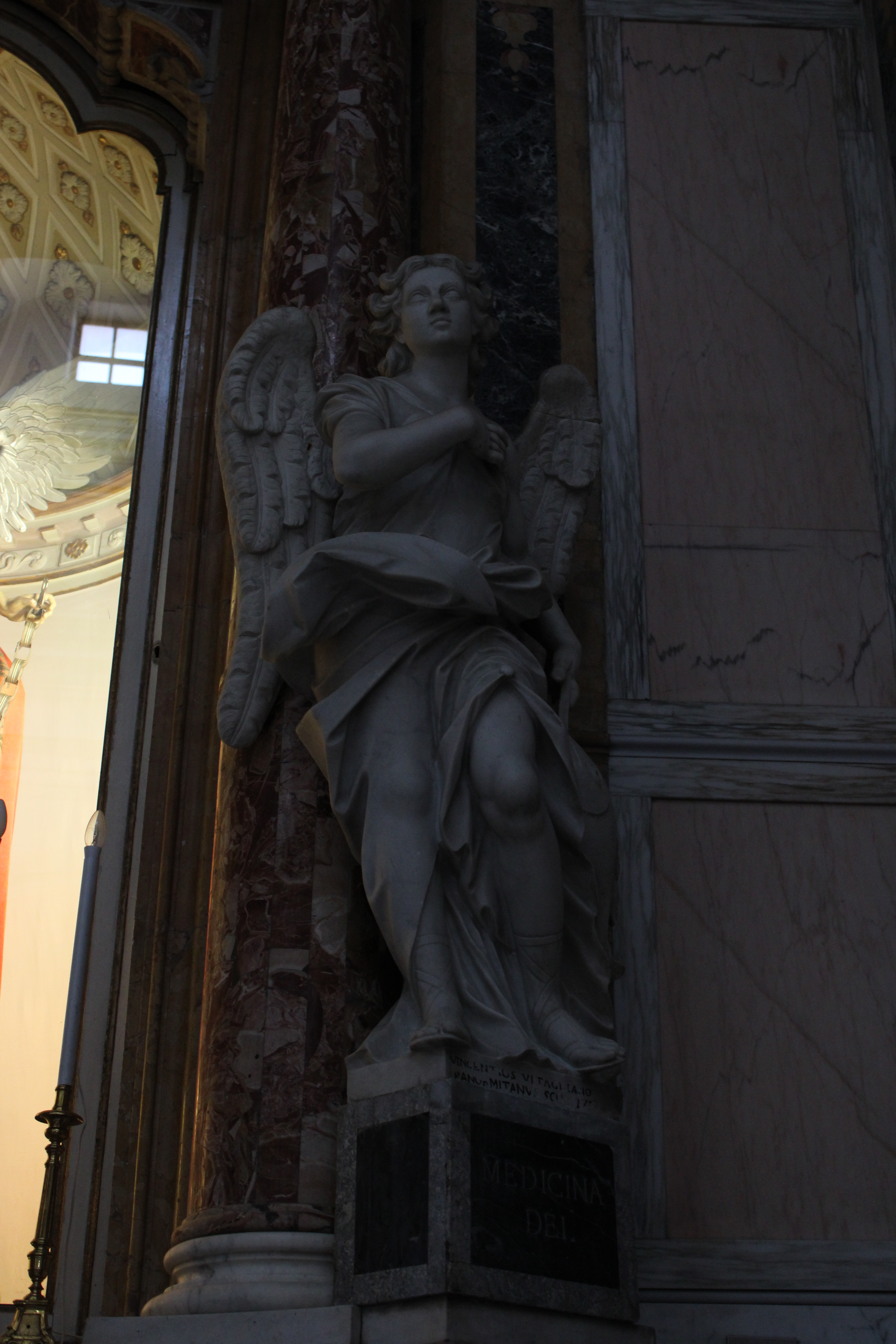
Archangel Gabriel

=== Central nave ===
- Counter-facade:

The counter-facade features three stucco reliefs depicting Mary, the Redeemer, and Saint Michael.

1. On the left, below the Virgin, is a portrait of the parish priest Raffaele Riccobene, a work by the Flemish painter Guglielmo Borremans. Further below is the sepulchral monument of the parish priest Antonio Morillo Galletti.
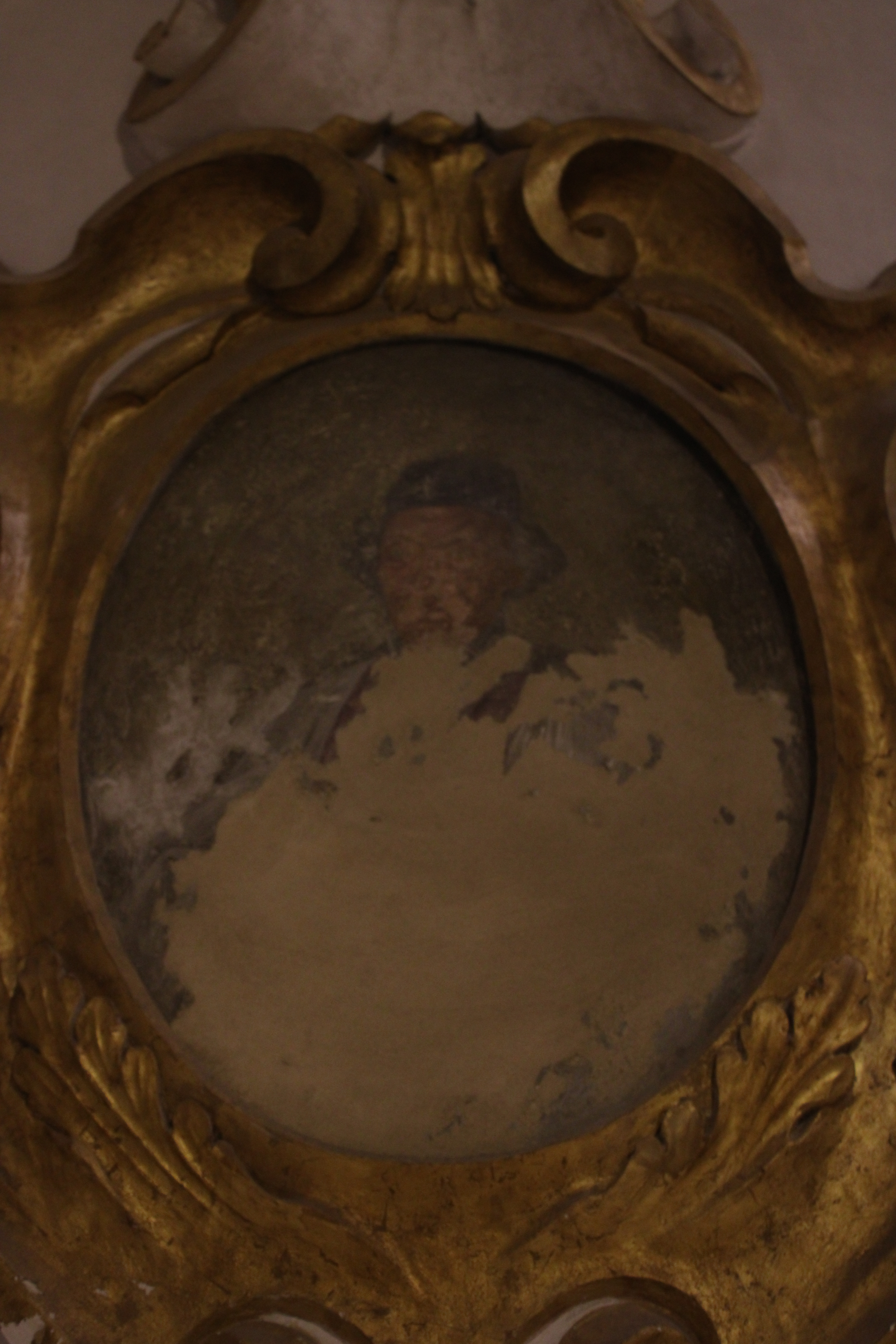
Raffaele Riccobene

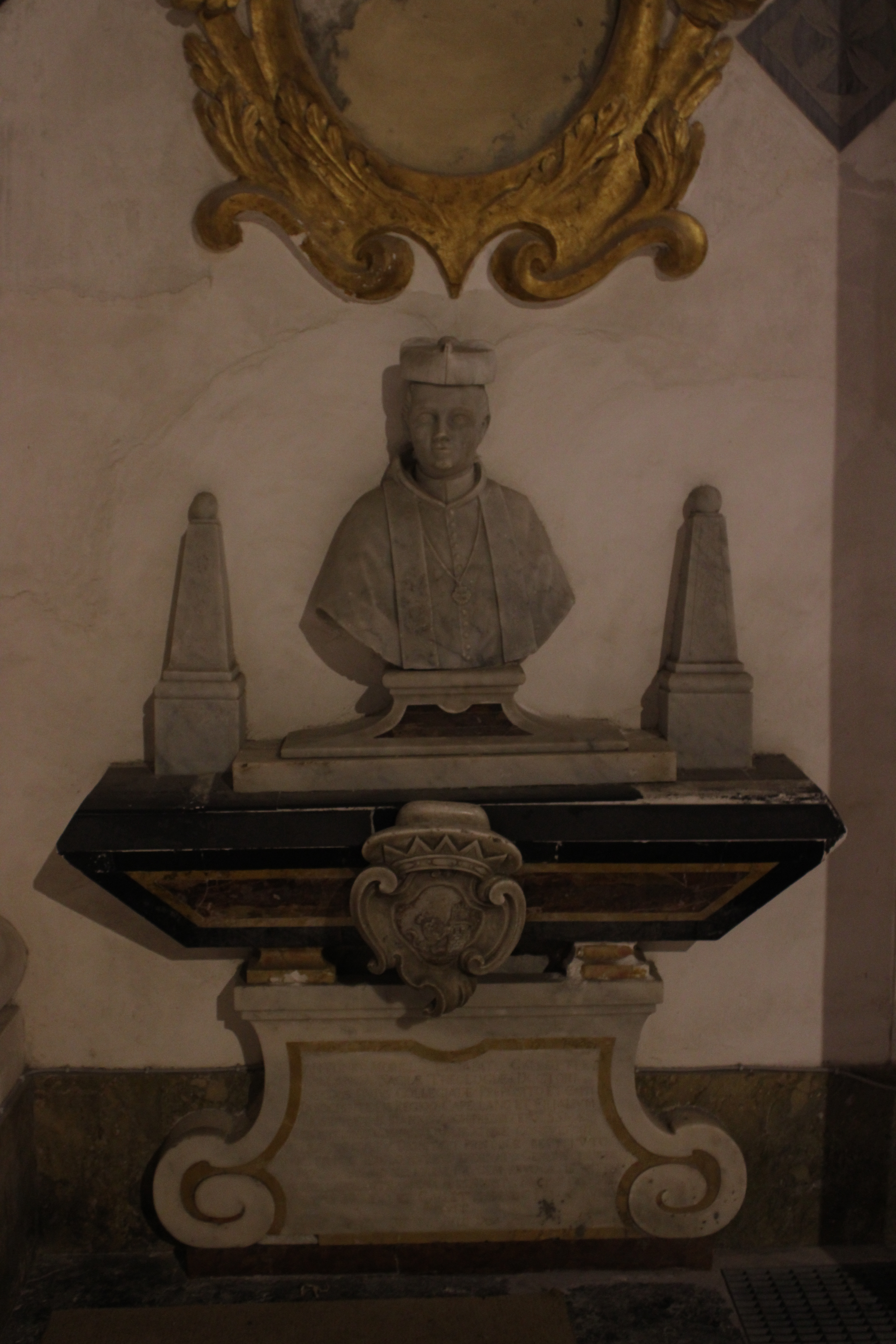
Sepulchral monument of Antonio Morillo Galletti
1. On the right, below the archangel, is a commemorative inscription dedicated to the parish priest Raffaele Riccobene. Below it is the sepulchral monument of Canon Giuseppe Sillitti.
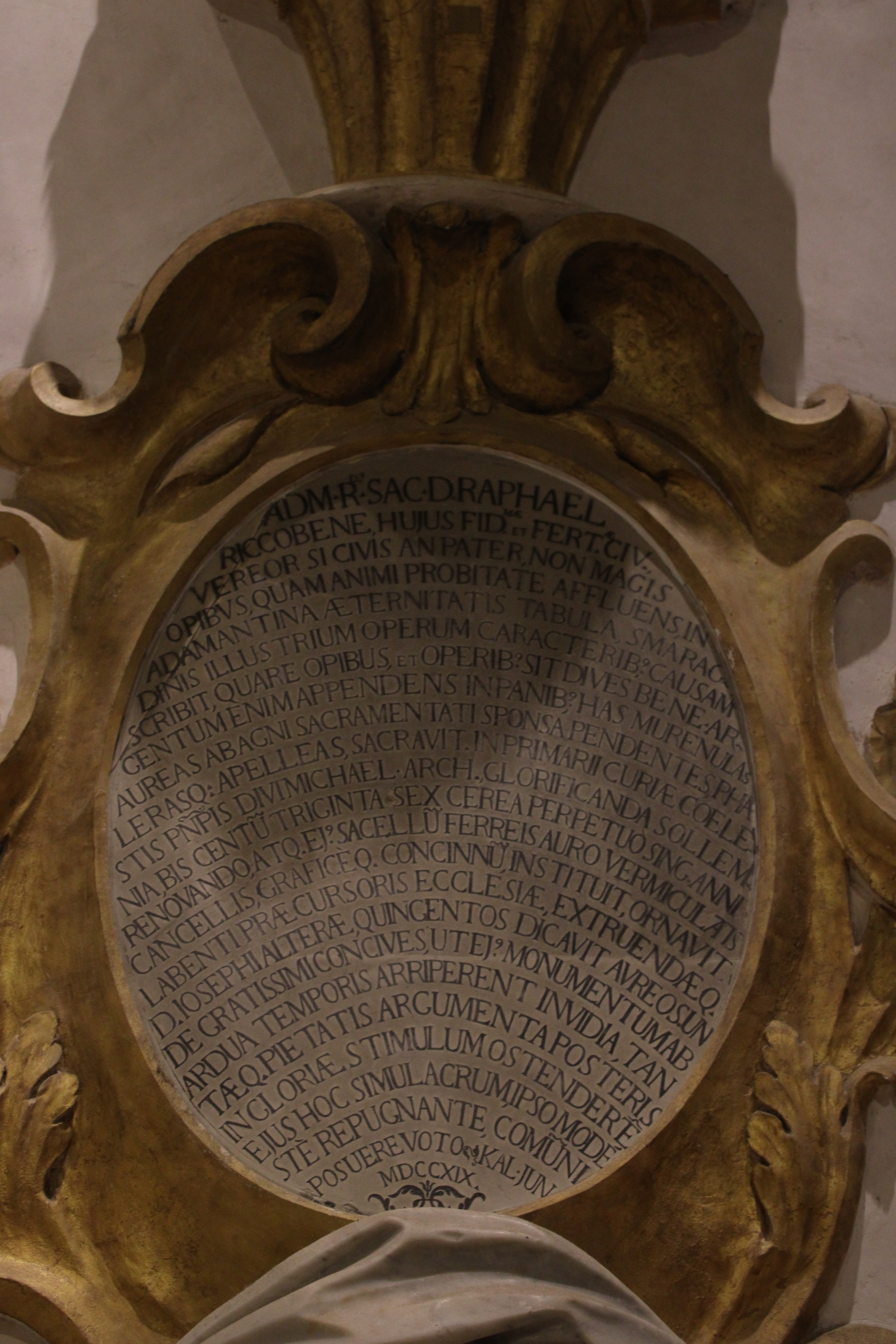
Commemorative inscription to Raffaele Riccobene

Above the main portal are two frescoes depicting events from the life of Moses and the Jewish people during their journey through the desert. The right fresco shows the elevation of the serpent as a means of salvation for the Jews bitten by venomous snakes, inspired by the twentieth chapter of the Book of Numbers. The left fresco depicts another event from the journey through the desert, drawn from the seventeenth chapter of the Exodus. In this scene, Moses strikes the rock from which potable water flows, greatly desired by the people.

- Colonnade:

The columns separating the naves number twelve, six on each side. Before the 1943 bombing, each column housed a statue of one of the apostles. They were entirely frescoed by Guglielmo Borremans and stuccoed by Francesco Ferrigno. The columns form fourteen arches, each dedicated to a figure from the Old Testament, with a total of 113 frescoes:

Right arches:

- Abraham
- Jacob
- Joseph
- Moses
- Jael and Ahimelech
- Esther
- David triumphing over Goliath

Left arches:

- Samson
- Saul
- King David
- Solomon
- Tobias
- Job
- Judith

The columns feature two significant inscriptions: the first, on the second right pillar, dated 1733, commemorates the solemn dedication of the Caltanissetta mother church on July 26, 1733, by Monsignor Lorenzo Gioeni, Bishop of Agrigento. The author of the plaque is uncertain, with Canon Francesco Pulci attributing it to Mariano Aristuto, while Mulè Bertòlo credits Luciano Aurelio Barrile. It is more likely that Pulci's hypothesis is correct, as Barrile was only sixteen years old at the time. The inscription reads:

Deo Optimo Maximo

Carolo VI. Imperiali Sua Altitudine in Sicilia regnante

quod vides augustum templum, viator, a

Laurentio Agrigentino Episcopo anno 1733 sacro chrisma

initiatur. Fuerat ab anno 1570 ad annum

1622 pietate Calatanixectentium exstructum,

inde anno 1720 sac. Raphaelis Riccobene sumptibus

auro, picturis caelato opere exornatum. Parochia

lia hic exercet archipresbyter Rogerii et Adelasiae

magnorum Siciliae comitum munificentia pontificali

olim dignitate praeditus, et Sancti Spiritus abbas. At

eo sacerdotio a Friderico II. Imperatore diviso, pontificalia

cum abbatia sedi pristinae addixit Caesar, parocha

tû verǒ archipresbiteri, regiique. capellani titulo

atque decimarum dote in regio

Sanctae Mariae Angelorum templo

statuit. Sed labentibus seculis alibi, demum

huc transfertur

anno Domini MDCXXII
To God, the Greatest and Best.

Under the reign of His Imperial Highness Charles VI in Sicily,

this august temple, which you, traveler, see,

was consecrated with holy chrism in 1733

by Lorenzo, Bishop of Agrigento.

From 1570 to 1622,

it was built through the piety of the people of Caltanissetta,

and in 1720, adorned with paintings and

gilded reliefs at the expense of Rev. Raffaele Riccobene.

Here, the archpriest, once endowed with pontifical dignity

and abbot of Santo Spirito, by the munificence

of the great counts of Sicily, Roger and Adelasia, administers the parish.

But when that dignity was separated by Emperor Frederick II,

the emperor assigned the pontifical rights with the abbey to the original seat

and established the true parish with the title of archpriest and royal chaplain

with a tithe endowment in the royal temple

of Santa Maria degli Angeli.

But as centuries passed, in another place,

it was finally transferred here

in the year of the Lord 1622.

— Mariano Aristuto

The original inscription contains many abbreviations, here presented in full. The plaque mentions several historical figures and key dates. The consecration and dedication of the parish church took place under Emperor Charles VI, with decorations funded by the faithful and the priest Raffaele Riccobene. It notes that Riccobene once held the title of "Abbot of Santo Spirito," where the abbey, founded by Counts Roger and Adelasia, was the city's first parish. It also mentions Emperor Frederick II, who separated the dignities, retaining pontifical rights for the original seat, the Santo Spirito Abbey, and establishing the true parish office with the title of archpriest and Royal Chaplain in the Royal Temple of Santa Maria degli Angeli. As the city moved upward, the mother church became the current cathedral.

The second inscription, on the second left pillar, reads:

Deo Omnium Maximo

Carolo III utriusque Siciliae rege.

Canonicorum insigne collegium Benedicti XIV

Pontificis Maximi auctoritate Petro Assuriensi Episcopo

delegata Laurentio Agrigentino et Matteo

Siracvsano Episcopis adstantibus magna nobilium

civitatum frequentia in hac Basilica instituitur.

Joannes Augustinus Riva primus fit prepositus hic

effusis opibus Abbas Didacus Lapedora et Ioannes Maria

Genovese inter canonicos adscripti consilio

et rebus gestis summam tanto operi posvere

anno MDCCXLVI
To God, the Greatest and Best

Under Charles III, King of the Two Sicilies,

the distinguished College of Canons was established

by the authority of Pope Benedict XIV,

delegated to Bishop Pietro of Assura,

in the presence of Bishops Lorenzo of Agrigento and Matteo of Syracuse,

with a great gathering of noble citizens

in this Basilica.

Giovanni Agostino Riva became the first provost here,

with the works completed by Abbot Diego Lapedora

and Giovanni Maria Genovese, among the canons enrolled in the Council,

who brought this great work to completion

in the year 1746.

— Unknown author

This second inscription commemorates the establishment of the Collegiate of Canons in the mother church on September 28, 1746, during the reign of Charles III, King of the Two Sicilies, by the authority of Pope Benedict XIV, delegated to Pietro Gioeni, the first titular bishop of Assura, in the presence of his brother Lorenzo Gioeni, Bishop of Agrigento, and Matteo Trigona, Bishop of Syracuse. As with the previous inscription, there is disagreement about the author; Pulci attributes it to Mariano Aristuto, while Mulè Bertòlo credits Luciano Aurelio Barrile. Anagraphically, this inscription could be by Barrile, who was twenty-nine, rather than Barresi, who was fifty-eight. However, the authorship remains uncertain.

Before the cathedral's reconstruction following the World War II bombings, the columns housed statues of the twelve Apostles, two of which were destroyed by the bombs. The remaining statues were removed "with extreme carelessness" along with the gilded wooden pulpit and the rear wall with the faux dome, frescoed by Borremans, which closed the apse and created a "depth of view that went beyond reality."

- Choir

Ascending to the presbytery, one finds the choir, at the center of which is the following inscription within a rich decoration of polychrome marbles, surrounded by a floral motif band:

Nec vacat exitio

indeclinabile naturae vectigal

hac solvunt in urna

fertilissimae urbis clerici.

Quippe mortis tributo

nullum eos arae privilegium,

nulla dignitas reddit immunes.

Dum Petri mystica velificabant in navi

ad sepulchralem scopulum allisi,

lethi subiere navfragium.

E navfragio tamen

ad immortalitatis

portum

emergunt

1712
There is no escape from death.

The clerics of this most fruitful city

pay in this urn

the inexorable tribute of nature.

Indeed, no privilege of the altar,

no dignity renders them immune to the tribute of death.

While they sailed in the mystical ship of Peter,

crashing against the sepulchral rock,

they suffered the shipwreck of death.

Yet from the shipwreck,

they emerge into the port of immortality

1712.

— Unknown author

Originally, this plaque was placed in the choir's floor, when the dome and transept were still absent, among the canons' stalls, beyond the iron gate, with several burials beneath it. Following the cathedral's expansion and the subsequent repaving of the central nave, the inscription was preserved and relocated to the choir's floor among the canons' stalls in the new presbytery, beyond the dome, creating a historical inaccuracy since there are no burials beneath it. The author is unknown, likely a cleric or scholar proficient in Latin and well-versed in classical culture, given the refined style. The plaque is dedicated to deceased clerics, who, despite the altar's privilege, are not immune to death but will emerge into the port of immortality. Thus, from every tomb, they will rise for the final resurrection.

On the right wall of the choir, high up, is an organ from the 17th century. The organ features numerous carvings and gilding in gold leaf. Its original location was between the fourth and fifth columns of the central nave, which once housed the choir. The organ is still as described by Canon Pulci: "A frame with a frieze of flowers and fruits and seraphim heads crowns the facade. At its center is an eagle with spread wings, flanked by vases of flowers, between which are two shields with vertically arranged initials D.O.M. (Deo Optimo Maximo) and I.C.V.M. (Immaculatae Conceptioni Virginis Mariae)." The organ's parapet is divided into seven panels, each depicting one of the seven archangels, identified from left to right by their halo inscriptions: Salitiel (Sealtiel), Raphael (Raphael), Gabriel (Gabriel), Michael (Michael), Barachiel (Barachiel), Uriel (Uriel), Ieuridel (Phanuel). The paintings are attributed to Vincenzo Roggeri or a 17th-century painter of similar style.

Opposite the organ is a large oil painting by a Sicilian 17th-century artist, depicting the Madonna of Monte Maggiore, seated on a cloud with the Child Jesus on her lap, surrounded by putti and kneeling Jesuits holding flaming hearts. The painting was originally in the cathedral's sacristy. Until 1767, the year of the first suppression of the Society of Jesus, it was in the Jesuit college, annexed to the Church of Sant'Agata, in the rooms where the Congregation of Gentlemen (or the People) met, along with other paintings depicting key moments of the Passion of Jesus, namely the prayer in Gethsemane, the flagellation, the crowning with thorns, and the meeting with the mother (or Swoon). All these paintings were placed in the former Madonna of the Mountains chapel and canonical chapel, now the Blessed Sacrament chapel. The crucifixion painting from the same series is now in the crypt. At the Madonna's feet, on the left, is Saint Ignatius of Loyola with the book of the Jesuit order's rule, which he founded, reading on the left page: "AD MAIO/RĒ DEI AC DEI/PARÆ GLORIĀ" (To the greater glory of God and the Mother of God) and on the right page: "REGULA SODALI/TII SĀ/CTÆ MAR. A CORDE" (Rule of the sodality of the Heart of Saint Mary). On the right is an angel holding a shield with the inscription: "SODALITII IHS" (of the IHS sodality), and with the left hand a banner with Simeon's words to Mary during the presentation of the infant Jesus at the temple, from Luke 2:35, "UT REVELENTUR EX MULTIS CORDIBUS COGITATIONES" (that the thoughts of many hearts may be revealed).

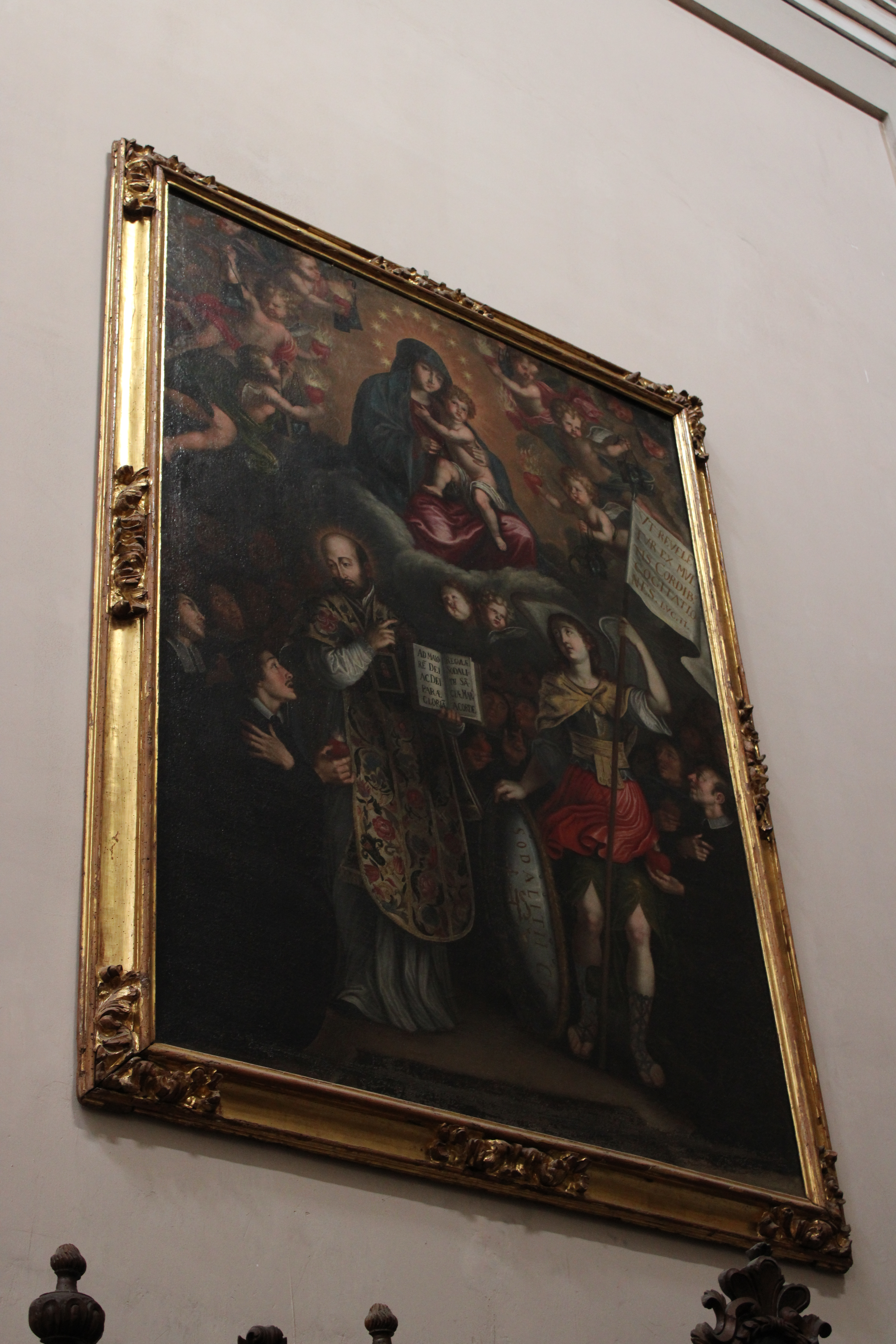
Madonna of Monte Maggiore

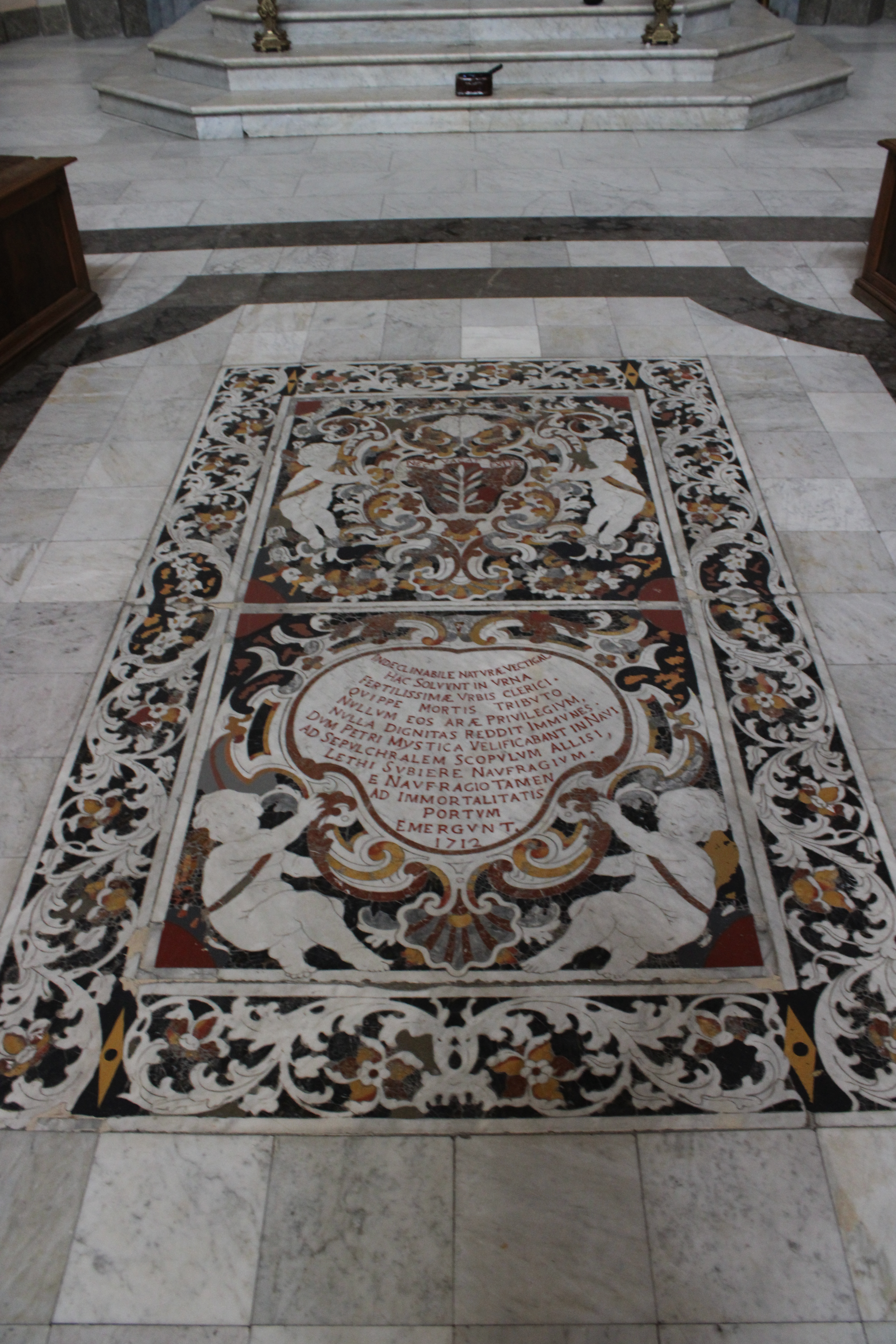
Choir plaque

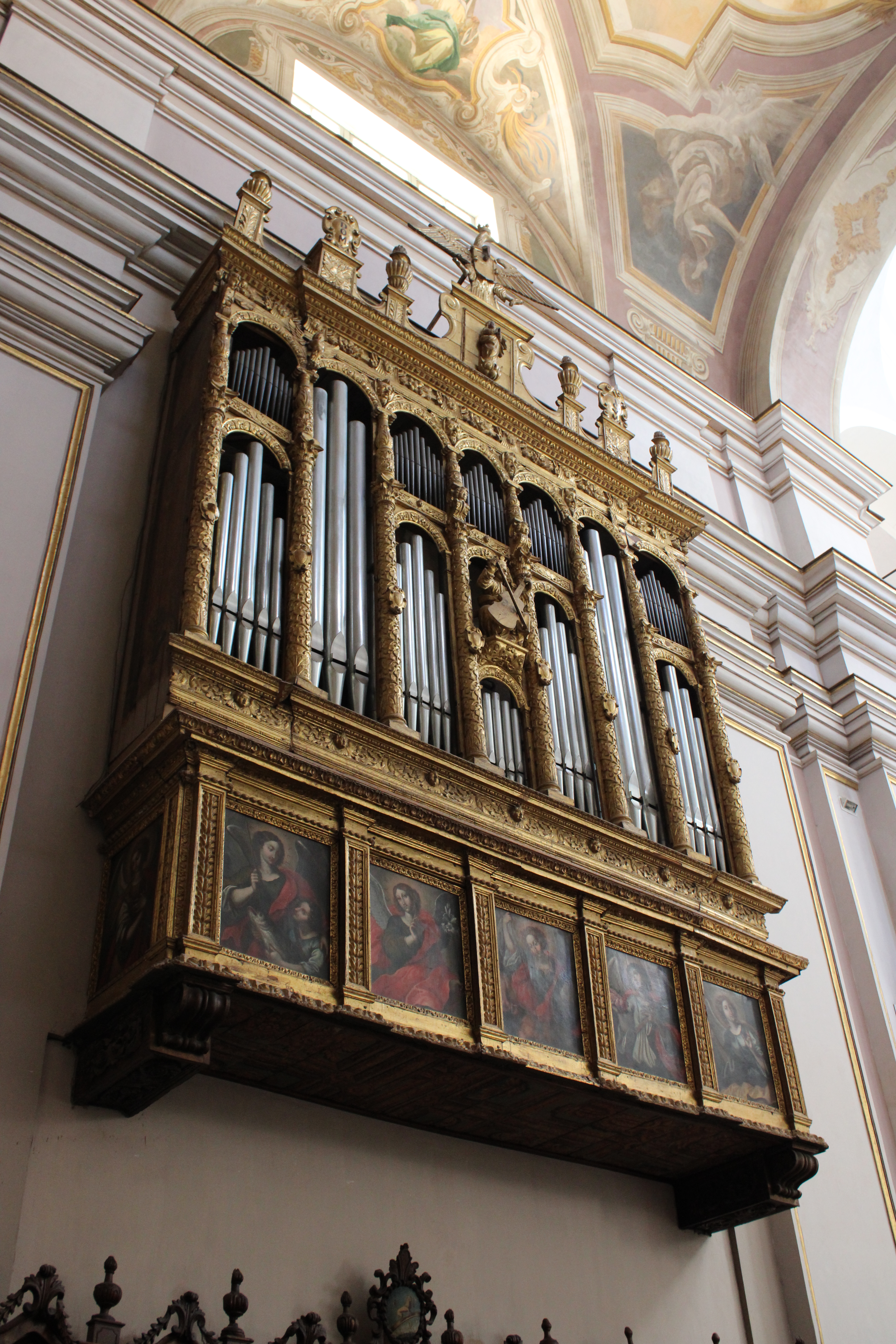
The organ
- Apse

At the back of the choir, above the painting of the Immaculate Conception, a work by Guglielmo Borremans, is the inscription: "Amicta Sole". The phrase is taken from the opening passage of chapter 12 of the Revelation and refers to the Woman Clothed with the Sun, described by the apostle John in his vision. In symbolic language, the author of Revelation seeks to inspire courage in persecuted Christians. It shows how God's plan unfolds in history despite evil. For the solemnity of the Assumption, the Church has chosen the Revelation passage describing the vision of the Woman Clothed with the Sun as the first reading of the mass of the day, to celebrate Mary with this grand biblical symbol, the Woman who triumphs over the dragon, the infernal serpent, which in Jewish tradition symbolizes the power of evil. The "great sign" that appeared "in heaven," in the spiritual realm, indicates a supernatural reality. The "sun" clothing the woman is God, the Word, the Light. The Church has adopted this image of the woman "clothed with the sun" to describe Mary. The "Woman," in addition to representing Mary, is a corporate personality: the people of God who give birth to the Messiah, definitively ascended to God through the resurrection, and is, at the same time, the people of God of the old and new covenants.

The apse is adorned with frescoes by the Turinese painter Nicola Arduino, created during the restoration of Borremans' frescoes. Initially, the plan was to fresco the transept, the dome, and the choir, but due to insufficient funds, only the semi-dome and the presbytery vault were frescoed. The semi-dome depicts "The Pentecost," the classic scene of Mary and the Apostles gathered in the upper room, receiving the power of the Holy Spirit, manifested as tongues of fire. The presbytery vault depicts the evangelical scene of the Ascension of Christ into heaven, in the presence of the astonished Apostles.

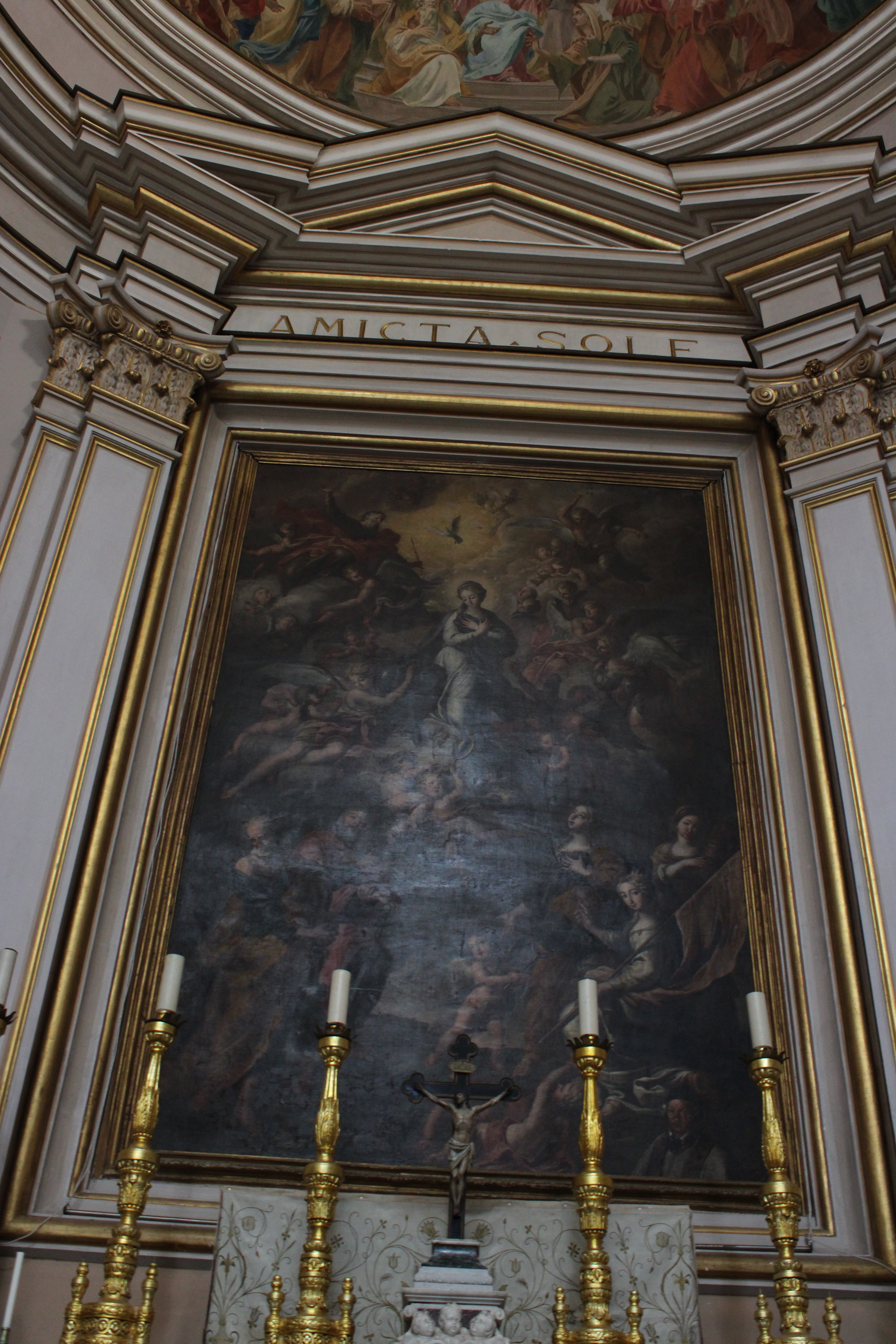
Immaculate Conception

- Flooring

Until 1731, the church's flooring was made of terracotta and contained thirteen scattered burials. Specifically, in the choir were the burials of priests, nearby those for deacons, subdeacons, and clerics; close by were the male and female burials of the Company of the Most Holy Conception and those of the "community." Near the Blessed Sacrament chapel (now the Sacred Heart of Jesus chapel) were the male and female burials of the Company; in the Saint Anne chapel, the burial of Giuseppe Aronica, who held the chapel's patronage; in the Most Holy Crucifix chapel, that of Simone Licari; in the Most Holy Rosary chapel, that of Giuseppe Di Forti; and finally, in the Mountains chapel (now the Blessed Sacrament chapel), that of the barons of Canicassè. By the mid-18th century, the flooring, already damaged in the side naves due to various burial works, was replaced. Work began on January 4, 1760, entrusted to the Caltanissetta master Sebastiano La Cagnina and master builder Geronimo Scarpulla. A flooring of 37x37 cm white and black stone slabs in a checkerboard pattern was chosen, like that still present in the Sant'Agata al Collegio Church, rejecting ceramic, then in vogue, not only because it was more expensive but because tile decorations could distract from the Borremans frescoes. Following these renovations, existing plaques were repositioned, discarding those that were broken or chipped; only the choir plaque and that of Arcangelo Vignuzzi in the left nave were preserved. Around 1911, the flooring was renewed with alabaster slabs. The choir area, enclosed by an iron balustrade, was raised by 50 cm. In 1948, the Civil Engineering Corps installed a new marble floor, and in 1958, a tiled floor. Finally, from 1960 to 1962, based on a design by architect Gaetano Averna, the current rich floor of polychrome marbles with geometric and symbolic patterns was installed in the central nave: castles, symbolizing the city; the scales and sword, symbols of Saint Michael; the star, symbol of Mary; and the episcopal and capitular coat of arms with the three-cornered hat, indicating the church's status as a cathedral and seat of the Canonical Chapter. The side naves' flooring dates to 1965, and the new presbytery flooring to 2002.

- Vault:

The vault features three series of frescoes related to the New Testament, the history of the Church, and its theology. The three series consist of five large central ovals, the story of the lives of Saints Peter and Paul, and the depiction of various saints. These frescoes reference the Acts of the Apostles, with the first twelve chapters focusing on Saint Peter and his activities, and the subsequent chapters on Saint Paul and his missionary journeys. Looking toward the altar, Saint Peter's story is on the left side of the vault, while Saint Paul's is on the right. These frescoes occupy the spaces between the windows, where various saints are depicted.

Starting with the frescoes narrating the life of Saint Peter, one finds:

1. "The Vocation of Saint Peter"
2. "The Delivery of the Keys"
3. "Jesus Entrusts His Sheep to Peter"
4. "Vision at Joppa"
5. "Peter Freed from Prison"
6. "The Baptism of Cornelius"
7. "Martyrdom of Saint Peter"

Regarding the series of Saint Paul, one finds:

1. "Vocation of Paul"
2. "Paul Persecuted, Saved Through the Outer Wall"
3. "Paul Speaks to the Procurator Felix"
4. "Paul at the Areopagus in Athens"
5. "Paul in Malta, Bitten by a Viper"
6. "Paul in Rome Proclaims the Gospel of the Kingdom"
7. "Martyrdom of Saint Paul: The Beheading"

The five ovals on the vault are:

1. "Catholic Faith Triumphing Over Other Religions"
2. "Glorious Christ with a Group of Angels, Saints, and Virgins"
3. "Immaculate Conception of the Virgin Mary"
4. "Coronation and Glorification of the Immaculate Mary"
5. "Triumph of Saint Michael Over the Rebellious Angels"

In the windows, various saints are depicted, on the left side:

1. "Saint Lawrence"
2. "Saint Lucy"
3. "Saint Eligius"
4. "Saint Anastasia"
5. "Saint Francis of Paola"
6. "Saint Agnes"
7. "Saint Gregory the Great"

On the right side:

1. "Saint Stephen"
2. "Saint Rosalia"
3. "Saint Augustine"
4. "Saint Ursula"
5. "Saint Angelo of Licata"
6. "Saint Venera"
7. "Saint Gaetano Thiene"

All these frescoes are the work of Guglielmo Borremans and were restored after the 1943 bombings by Nicola Arduino.

The vault also features several inscriptions. In the first fresco from the entrance, one finds Nicola Arduino's signature:

Has duas tabulas G.mi Borremans bello destructas N.us Arduino Taur.si refecit A. MCMLIV
Nicola Arduino of Turin, in the year 1954, restored these two paintings by Guglielmo Borremans, destroyed by the war.

— Nicola Arduino

Borremans also signed his works, with the central fresco inscribed:

Gvglielmo Borremans Fiamengo P.Ano 1720
Painted by Guglielmo Borremans, Flemish, in the year 1720.

— Guglielmo Borremans

Notably, the adjective "Flemish" referring to Borremans is Latinized as "Fiamengo" instead of the correct "flandrensis" for the Flanders region.

The final inscription on the vault is on the sail of the central window:

Haec est domvs Domini
This is the House of the Lord

— Unknown Sicilian

This is taken from the Responsory of the Liturgy of the Hours' Office In Dedicatione Ecclesiae, in two forms from different sources: Haec est domus Domini et porta caeli, et vocabitur nomen loci huius aula dei (This is the house of the Lord and the gate of heaven, and the name of this place shall be called the palace of God), referring to Jacob's dream of the ladder reaching heaven, narrated in Genesis 28:17,22; or: Haec est domus Domini, firmiter aedificata. Bene fundata est supra firmam petram (This is the house of the Lord, firmly built. It is well-founded on a solid rock), referring to the Gospel of Matthew 7:24–25, where Jesus speaks of the wise man who built his house on the rock.

=== Transept ===
- Left section

At the center of the wall dominates the painting of Our Lady of Mount Carmel by Filippo Paladini. On the left wall is the sepulchre of Bishop Alfredo Maria Garsia, and opposite it are two paintings by Vincenzo Roggeri depicting Saint Rosalia and the Nativity of Mary.

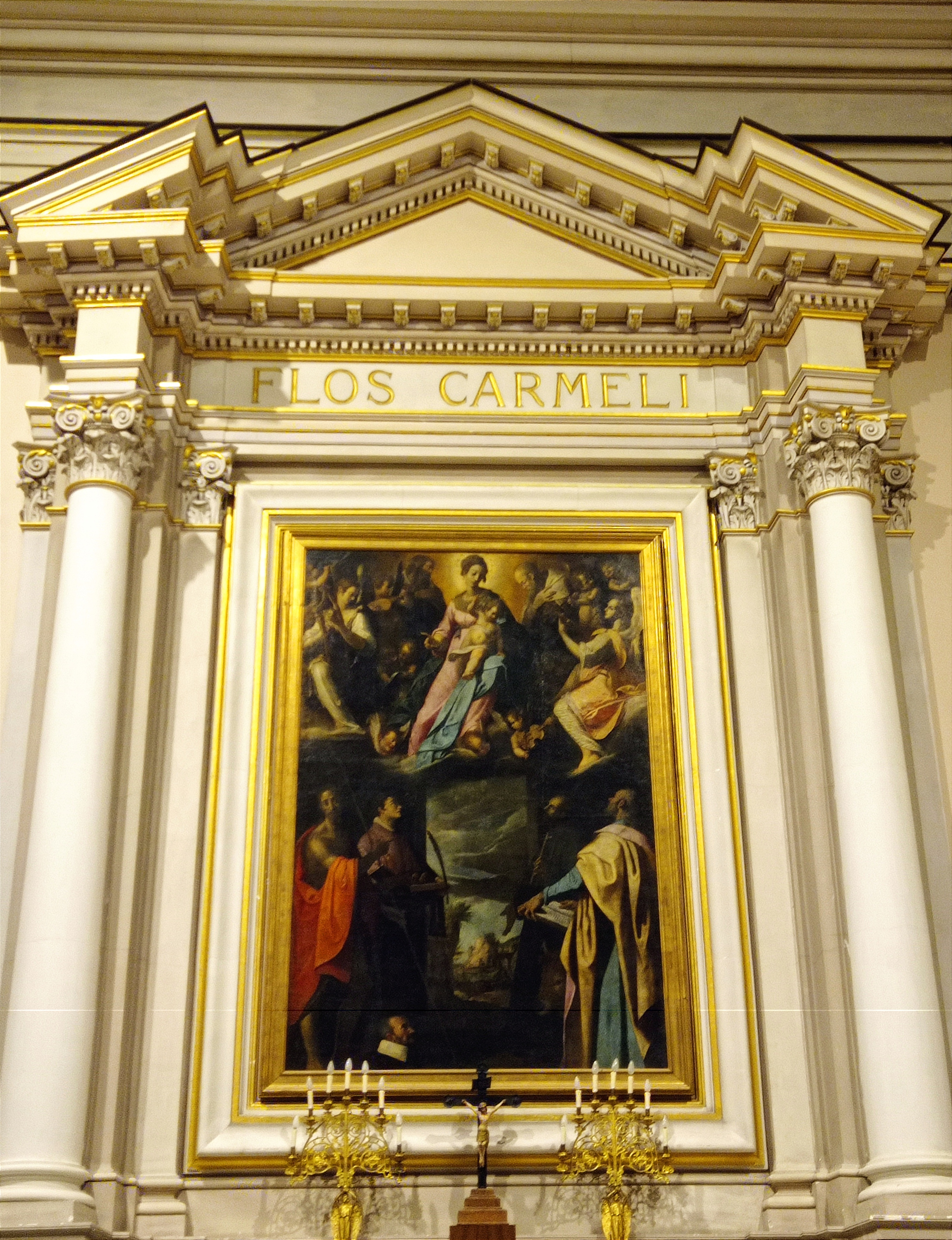
Our Lady of Mount Carmel

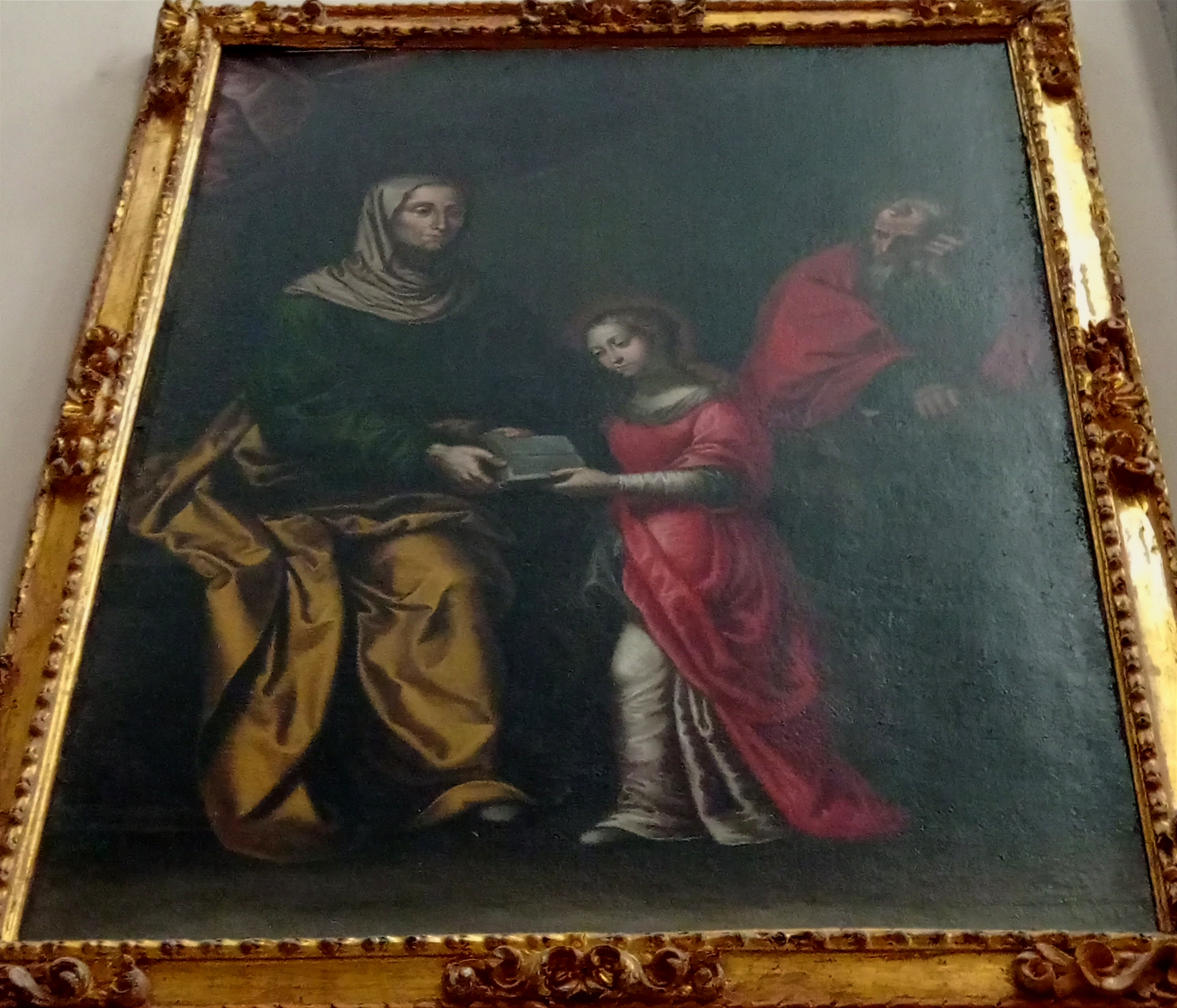
Saint Anne, Saint Joachim, and the Child Mary
- Central section

From 2002 to 2003, the entire liturgical area was adapted to the Second Vatican Council reforms, now extending under the dome, with the altar at its center. The truncated pyramidal marble altar, made of pink marble, is almost embedded in the center of the liturgical area, with a matching marble cathedra behind it, and further forward are the celebrant's wooden seat and the ambon. The adaptation was designed by architect Eugenio Abruzzini.

- Right section

On the central wall is a painting by an unknown Sicilian artist from the second half of the 17th century. The side walls feature two additional paintings from the Sicilian school.

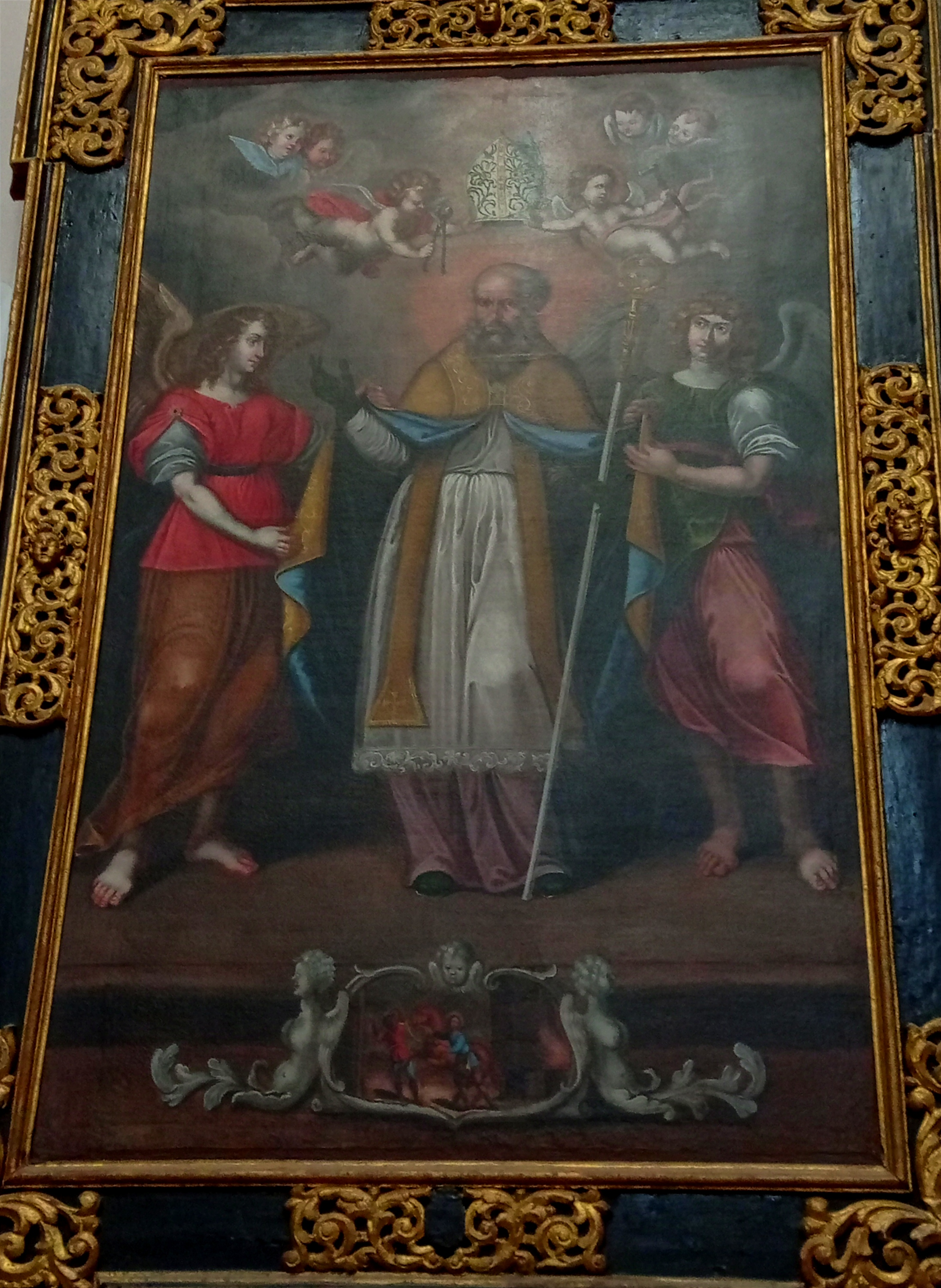
Saint Eligius

In June 2024, work began to adorn the transept vault with frescoes by the Neapolitan artist Salvatore Seme.

== Burials ==
The Caltanissetta Cathedral houses the burials of several bishops:

- Antonino Maria Stromillo, 1st bishop of Caltanissetta and apostolic administrator of Calascibetta, in the Immaculate Conception Chapel;
- Giovanni Battista Guttadauro di Reburdone, 2nd bishop of Caltanissetta and apostolic administrator of Calascibetta, in the Saint Lawrence Chapel;
- Ignazio Zuccaro, 3rd bishop of Caltanissetta and apostolic administrator of Calascibetta, in the Saint Lawrence Chapel;
- Giovanni Jacono, 5th bishop of Caltanissetta and apostolic administrator of Calascibetta, in the Redeemer Chapel;
- Francesco Monaco, 6th bishop of Caltanissetta and apostolic administrator of Calascibetta, in the Saint Anne Chapel;
- Alfredo Maria Garsia, 7th bishop of Caltanissetta and apostolic administrator of Calascibetta, in the transept to the right of the altar;
- Giovanni Rizzo, archbishop of Rossano, in the Saint Stephen Chapel;
- Baldassare Leone, bishop of Agrigento, who died in Caltanissetta during a pastoral visit, in the Immaculate Conception Chapel.

Also present are the burials of two Caltanissetta nobles:

- Giovanni Barile, Baron of Turolifi, in the Saint Felix Chapel;
- Giuseppe Barile, priest and noble, in the Saint Felix Chapel.

== Religious feasts ==
- May 8, San Michele u virdi, commemorating the miracle that freed Caltanissetta from the plague in 1625, with a procession from the cathedral to the San Michele alle Calcare Church. The statue is returned to the cathedral two weeks later.
- August 6, Feast of the Redeemer, co-patron of the city, with a procession through the old city and return to the cathedral.
- September 29, Patronal Feast of Saint Michael the Archangel, established following the 1625 apparition, with a procession through the city and the statue's return to the cathedral; a fair, dating back to 1550, is held during these days.
- December 8, Feast of the Immaculate Conception, co-patroness of Caltanissetta, with a procession from the cathedral to the San Francesco Church. The statue is returned to the cathedral two weeks later.
- December 28, Feast of the Three Saints and Te Deum in thanksgiving for surviving the 1908 Messina earthquake, with a procession of the statues of Saint Michael the Archangel, Immaculate Conception, and Redeemer.

== See also ==
- Caltanissetta
- Guglielmo Borremans
- Filippo Paladino

== Bibliography ==
- Mulè Bertòlo, Giovanni (1906). Caltanissetta nei tempi che furono e nei tempi che sono [Caltanissetta in Times Past and Present]. Caltanissetta: Lussografica.
- Scarlata, Calogero (1997). Santa Maria la Nova. La Cattedrale di Caltanissetta [Santa Maria la Nova: The Cathedral of Caltanissetta]. Caltanissetta: Lussografica.
- Muscarella, Andrea Gaetano (2023). Le iscrizioni latine nella chiesa cattedrale Santa Maria La Nova in Caltanissetta [Latin Inscriptions in the Cathedral Church of Santa Maria La Nova in Caltanissetta]. Caltanissetta: Lussografica. ISBN 978-88-8243-581-3.
- Riva, Giovanni Agostino (1731). Stato della Città di Caltanissetta sotto l'arciprete D. Giovanni Agostino Riva [State of the City of Caltanissetta under Archpriest D. Giovanni Agostino Riva]. Edizioni Lussografica.
- Salvaggio, Rosario (2008). La volta della Cattedrale narra il Nuovo Tesatmento [The Cathedral Vault Narrates the New Testament]. Caltanissetta: Paruzzo.
- Salvaggio, Rosario (2007). Gli archi della cattedrale narrano l'Antico Testamento [The Cathedral Arches Narrate the Old Testament]. Caltanissetta: Paruzzo. ISBN 978-8-861-49009-3.
- Pulci, Francesco. Lavori sulla storia ecclesiastica di Caltanissetta [Works on the Ecclesiastical History of Caltanissetta].
- Pulci, Francesco. Caltanissetta e la Vergine [Caltanissetta and the Virgin].
- Di Marzo, Gioacchino (1912). Guglielmo Borremans di Anversa, Pittore Fiammingo in Sicilia [Guglielmo Borremans of Antwerp, Flemish Painter in Sicily]. Palermo: Stabilimento Tipografico Virzì. p. 29.
- Canalella, Gaetano. "Guardando al completamento degli affreschi della Cattedrale di Caltanissetta" [Looking at the completion of the frescoes in Caltanissetta Cathedral.]. Atti della Tavola Rotonda.
- Bartolozzi, Silvana (2001). Il restauro della Cattedrale di Caltanissetta: lettura di un complesso architettonico, pittorico e decorativo [The Restoration of the Caltanissetta Cathedral: A Study of an Architectural, Pictorial, and Decorative Complex]. Caltanissetta: S. Sciascia. ISBN 8-882-41120-6.
- Pitrè, Giuseppe (1900). Feste patronali in Sicilia [Patronal Festivals in Sicily]. Turin-Palermo: Carlo Clausen. pp. 511–517.
