= Carmelo Ferraro =

Italian Roman Catholic prelate (born 1932)

Most Reverend Carmelo Ferraro
- Archbishop emeritus of Agrigento
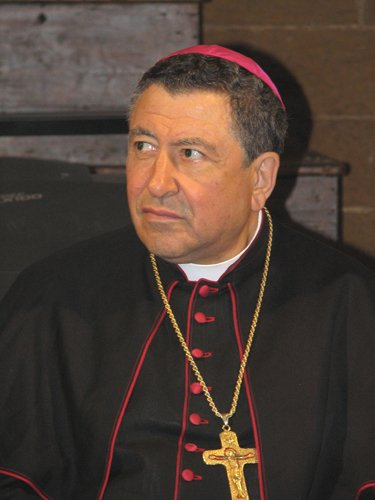
- Church: Catholic Church
- Archdiocese: Agrigento
- Installed: 3 November 1988
- Term ended: 23 February 2008
- Predecessor: Luigi Bommarito
- Successor: Francesco Montenegro
- Other post: Bishop of Patti (1978–1988)

Orders
- Ordination: 3 July 1955 by Ettore Baranzini
- Consecration: 13 May 1978 by Salvatore Pappalardo

Personal details
- Born: 12 September 1932 (age 93) Santa Croce Camerina, Kingdom of Italy
- Denomination: Catholic
- Motto: Ignem veni mittere in terram
- Coat of arms

Carmelo Ferraro (born 12 September 1932) is an Italian Roman Catholic prelate, who served as the Archbishop of Agrigento for nearly two decades. He is particularly recognized for his role during the historic visit of Pope John Paul II to Sicily and his subsequent elevation as the first Metropolitan Archbishop of Agrigento.

== Early life and priesthood ==
Carmelo Ferraro was born on 12 September 1932 in Santa Croce Camerina, a town in the Province of Ragusa. He began his theological studies at the local seminary in Ragusa and was ordained to the priesthood on 3 July 1955 by Archbishop Ettore Baranzini, who was then the Archbishop of Siracusa e Ragusa. Following his ordination, Ferraro served in various pastoral and administrative capacities within the Diocese of Ragusa, including serving as a parish priest and a teacher in the diocesan seminary.

== Episcopal ministry ==
=== Bishop of Patti ===
On 30 March 1978, Pope Paul VI appointed Ferraro as the Bishop of Patti. He received his episcopal consecration on 13 May 1978 at the Communal Stadium in Vittoria from Cardinal Salvatore Pappalardo, with Bishops Angelo Rizzo and Sebastiano Rosso serving as co-consecrators. During his ten years in Patti, he focused on the implementation of the reforms of the Second Vatican Council and the modernization of diocesan structures.

=== Archbishop of Agrigento ===
On 3 November 1988, Pope John Paul II transferred him to the Diocese of Agrigento. A pivotal moment in his tenure occurred in May 1993, when he hosted the Pope during a pastoral visit to the Valle dei Templi. During this visit, John Paul II delivered an impromptu and forceful condemnation of the Sicilian Mafia, an event Ferraro later described as a "cry from the heart" that profoundly affected the local community.

On 2 December 2000, the Diocese of Agrigento was elevated to the rank of a Metropolitan See. Consequently, Ferraro was named the first Metropolitan Archbishop of Agrigento.

== Retirement ==
Upon reaching the mandatory retirement age of 75, Ferraro submitted his resignation. Pope Benedict XVI accepted it on 23 February 2008, appointing Francesco Montenegro as his successor.

In retirement, Ferraro returned to his native Diocese of Ragusa but remains active in the spiritual life of the Sicilian Church. In September 2022, he celebrated his 90th birthday, receiving public tributes from the current leadership of the Archdiocese of Agrigento for his years of service.
