= Alberto Vassallo-Torregrossa =

Italian prelate and church diplomat

Alberto Vassallo di Torregrossa (28 December 1865, San Cataldo, Sicily - 7 September 1959, San Cataldo) was an Italian prelate and church diplomat. He was the last papal nuncio to Munich.

== Life ==
The son of baron Rosario Vassallo di Torregrossa and Rosa dei Baroni Torregrossa, he attended the minor archepiscopal seminary at Catania the San Michele College in the Acireale and finally the Pontifical Roman Seminary, where he graduated in theology and civil and canon law and gained a diploma in letters. On 22 September 1888 he was ordained a priest in the church of San Sebastiano in Caltanissetta by Francica-Nava de Bontifè, bishop in partibus of Alabanda and auxiliary bishop to Alberto's uncle Giovanni Guttadauro, bishop of Caltanissetta. He held his first mass in the mother church of San Cataldo.

In 1889 he was admitted to the Academy of Ecclesiastical Nobles to study as a church diplomat. In 1891 he was made a canon of San Cataldo and he also brought the Ursulines to San Cataldo. His uncle, bishop Guttadauro, called him "the pearl of his diocese". In 1892 he entered the Secretariat of State and six years later pope Leo XIII made him a secret chamberlain. Cardinal Rampolla spotted him and he was sent to the apostolic nunciature of Bavaria in Munich as a secretary. In 1902 he became auditor to the Nunciature to Brussels, where he wrote Piccolo studio del clero belga and was awarded the Order of Leopold. The nuncio there sent him back to Munich and he was decorated with the Order of the Holy Sepulchre.

On 25 November 1913 Pope Pius X made him titular archbishop (in partibus) of Emesa and sent him as apostolic delegate to Colombia. On 10 January 1914 the pope granted him a private audience and on the following 18 January he was consecrated a bishop in the Latino-American college by Cardinal Merry del Val. The pope received him for another private audience on 25 January 1914. Pope Benedict XV sent him to Argentina as a diplomat in 1916 and he was made Apostolic Nuncio to Munich in August 1925, succeeding Eugenio Pacelli (later Pope Pius XII). He was granted the Order of Merit of the Bavarian Crown, the Order of Saint Michael, and the Royal Order of Albert of Saxony.

The German states later lost their autonomy and in the wake of this ceased having their own diplomatic representation from the Holy See in January 1934. The Bavarian nunciature in Munich was closed on 23 October 1936. Vassallo di Torregrossa returned to Italy and retired to San Cataldo, where he died aged 93. On 27 April 2009 his body was exhumed in the presence of Mario Russotto, Bishop of Caltanissetta, and reinterred on 7 September 2009, the fiftieth anniversary of his death, in the mother church in San Cataldo, near the tomb of Cataldo Naro.
