= Diocese of Germensis in Galatia =

Roman Catholic titular see

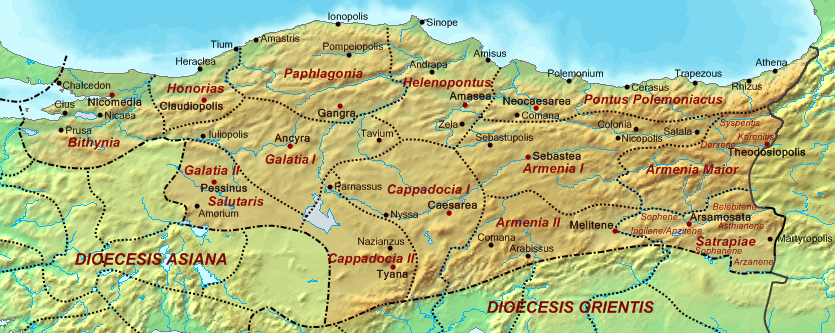
The Diocese of Pontus in the 5th century.

The Diocese of Germa in Galatia or Germensis in Galatia is a suppressed see and now a titular see of the Roman Catholic Church. Its seat was at Germensis in Galatia (also known as Germocolonia or Germacolonia) in the province of Galatia in the civil diocese of Pontus (present day northern central Turkey). It formed part of the Patriarchate of Constantinople and was a suffragan see of the Archdiocese of Pessinus. Only one bishop of the see is known, Eustacius, who is mentioned as attending the Fourth Council of Constantinople in 879 which rehabilitated patriarch Photios I of Constantinople.

== Titular see ==
It was revived as a titular see in 1916 and has been held by:

- Jean Raynaud † (5 July 1916 – 25 November 1937 died)
- Francesco Pieri † (2 January 1941 – 6 December 1941; translated to Orvieto)
- Angelo Rossini † (18 July 1942 – 10 March 1947; translated to Amalfi)
- Pietro Severi † (21 June 1948 – 8 January 1953; translated to Segni)
- Francesco Monaco † (12 December 1953 – 2 October 1956; later bishop of Caltanissetta)
- Filippo Aglialoro † (5 October 1957 – 4 February 1988; died)
- Ricardo Blázquez Pérez (8 April 1988 – 26 May 1992; translated to Palencia)
- Paolo Gillet, from 7 December 1993

== Sources ==
- La sede titolare nel sito di www.catholic-hierarchy.org ^{[self-published]}
- La sede titolare nel sito di www.gcatholic.org ^{[self-published]}
- Pius Bonifacius Gams, Series episcoporum Ecclesiae Catholicae, Leipzig 1931, p. 441
- Michel Lequien, Oriens christianus in quatuor Patriarchatus digestus, Paris, 1740, Vol. I, coll. 497–498
