= Vincenzo Lipani =

Italian Roman Catholic priest

Venerable Vincenzo Lipani O.F.M. Cap.
- Born: 28 December 1842; Caltanissetta, Kingdom of the Two Sicilies
- Died: 9 July 1920 (aged 77); Caltanissetta, Kingdom of Italy
- Venerated in: Roman Catholic Church
- Attributes: Franciscan habit
- Patronage: Franciscan Sisters of the Lord

Vincenzo Lipani (28 December 1842 - 9 July 1920) - in religious Angelico was an Italian Roman Catholic priest and a professed member from the Order of Friars Minor Capuchin who founded the Franciscan Sisters of the Lord. Lipani settled on the religious life (despite his parents insisting he become a diocesan priest instead) but later joined the Franciscans after his parents relented; he did his religious formation as well as his theological and philosophical studies in Palermo where he was ordained in 1865. But new legislation forced religious orders to dissolve and he instead began to serve as a teacher in Caltanissetta for over two decades before being given a parish church to renovate and act from. He later was able to help restore his order in the region and founded a religious congregation dedicated to tending to the poor.

The beatification process for Lipani had opened in the late 1990s in the Caltanissetta diocese and he became titled as a Servant of God; he became titled as Venerable in mid-2019 after Pope Francis confirmed that Lipani had practiced heroic virtue throughout his life.

== Life ==
Vincenzo Lipani was born on 28 December 1842 in Caltanissetta as the sixth of eight children born to Salvatore Lipani and Calogera Raitano. He was baptized on his birthdate in his local parish church.

He received his Confirmation in 1849 from the first Bishop of Caltanissetta Antonino Maria Stromillo.

He had expressed a desire to become a priest in a religious congregation despite his parents opposing that idea. His parents suggested to him that it would be better that he enter the diocesan priesthood so that he could remain in his hometown; this was important to them more so since his brother Pietro - a diocesan priest - died not long after his ordination in their hometown due to bronchopneumonia. But Lipani had settled on the religious life, and it was strong enough that his parents later relented and gave him their blessing. Lipani entered the Order of Friars Minor Capuchin at their convent in Caccamo near Palermo to commence his novitiate period on 23 October 1861; he received the habit and also assumed the religious name of "Angelico". He completed his novitiate period on 24 October 1862 and made his initial profession that December before he was transferred to Palermo to undergo his philosophical and theological studies under the Jesuits. He made his solemn profession on 23 October 1865 and received his elevation to the diaconate on 1 November 1865 from Bishop Agostino Franco. Lipani received his ordination to the priesthood on 3 December 1865 from Archbishop Domenico Maria Ciluffo e Costa. Lipani decided to remain in Palermo so that he could complete his studies.

But his time in the religious life would be short lived since legislation was enforced not long after his ordination that suppressed religious congregations. This forced him to set aside his habit and leave the convent and take up the diocesan clerical cassock. He placed himself under the direction of the Bishop of Caltanissetta Giovanni Battista Guttardauro and awaited his next assignment. He obtained permission from the bishop in 1868 to preach and began to dedicate himself to the spiritual direction and material assistance of the Third Order Franciscans in the area while in 1874 being assigned to teach Latin grammar to seminarians which he did until 1899. During this period he had helped to form three future bishops as well as a prominent medical professor and the future canon Michele Gerbino (whom he would later collaborate with towards the end of his life). The bishop also made him the rector for a small church on the diocese's outskirts named Signore della Città, and it was there that he began renovations and promoted collections for the poor; the renovations were completed in 1877.

In September 1883 he acquired several houses that he renovated for the families of the sulphur miners that died in the mine collapses in Gessolungo in 1881 and Tumminelli in 1882. In October 1884 he worked with twelve orphans to pick out a house for them while aiding two women in becoming professed religious. This formed the basis for his religious congregation that he founded on 15 October 1885, called the Franciscan Sisters of the Lord. The order received diocesan approval from Bishop Ignazio Zuccaro while the Countess Adelaide Testasecca became a great benefactor for the order and would provide art pieces to them. Lipani also promoted Catholic publishing through the Svegliarino dei Terziari Francescani publication that began in December 1879 and was published each month; he wrote articles himself to explain the Third Order Franciscans as well as other spiritual topics. He also was a big promoter of social justice initiatives in favor of the poor and ministered to those who were poor in the area. In 1899 the bishop gave him the San Michele alle Calcare convent to replenish the order in that region in gratitude for his work as a teacher and among the poor.

In September 1912 his health started to decline and so he attained permission from the Provincial Minister for permission to live with his two sisters at home. His sisters Damiana and Teresa looked after him. Lipani died in mid-1920 at his home, and since 19 October 1947, his remains have been housed in his old church after his remains were transferred from a grave at Santa Maria degli Angeli. The decree of praise came from Pope Pius XII a Third Order Franciscan, on 7 December 1950, and full papal approval for his order came from Pope John XXIII a Third Order Franciscan, on 30 August 1960. In late 2008 his order had 310 sisters in 54 houses in places such as the Philippines while their general headquarters is located in Rome.

== Beatification process ==
The beatification process for the late priest launched on 30 June 1997 after the Congregation for the Causes of Saints titled Lipani as a Servant of God and issued the official "nihil obstat" (no objections) edict that declared no impediments would prevent the cause being launched. The Caltanissetta diocese launched a diocesan process of investigation on 11 October 1997 and later closed it on 9 July 2001; the C.C.S. in Rome validated this process on 2 May 2008 after determining it completed its work and adhered to C.C.S. rules for conducting causes. The postulation (officials in charge of the cause) submitted the official Positio dossier to the C.C.S. on 23 February 2016 for evaluation.

Nine theologians issued their unanimous approval to the cause on 17 January 2019, as did the C.C.S. cardinal and bishop members later on 18 June 2019. Lipani became titled as Venerable on 5 July 2019 after Pope Francis confirmed that the late priest had practiced heroic virtue throughout his life to a sufficient degree.

The current postulator for this cause is the Capuchin priest Carlo Calloni.
