= Diocese of Ragusa =

Diocese of Ragusa may refer to:

- Roman Catholic Archdiocese of Ragusa, now Dubrovnik, Croatia, Latin: Dioecesis Ragusiensis, erected 990
- Roman Catholic Diocese of Ragusa, Sicily, Latin: Dioecesis Ragusiensis, erected 1950
