= Russotto =

Russotto is a surname. Notable people with the surname include:

- Andrea Russotto (born 1988), Italian footballer
- Mario Russotto (born 1957), Italian Roman Catholic bishop
