= Giovanni Jacono =

Italian Roman Catholic prelate (1873–1957)

Venerable Giovanni Jacono
- Bishop Emeritus of Caltanissetta
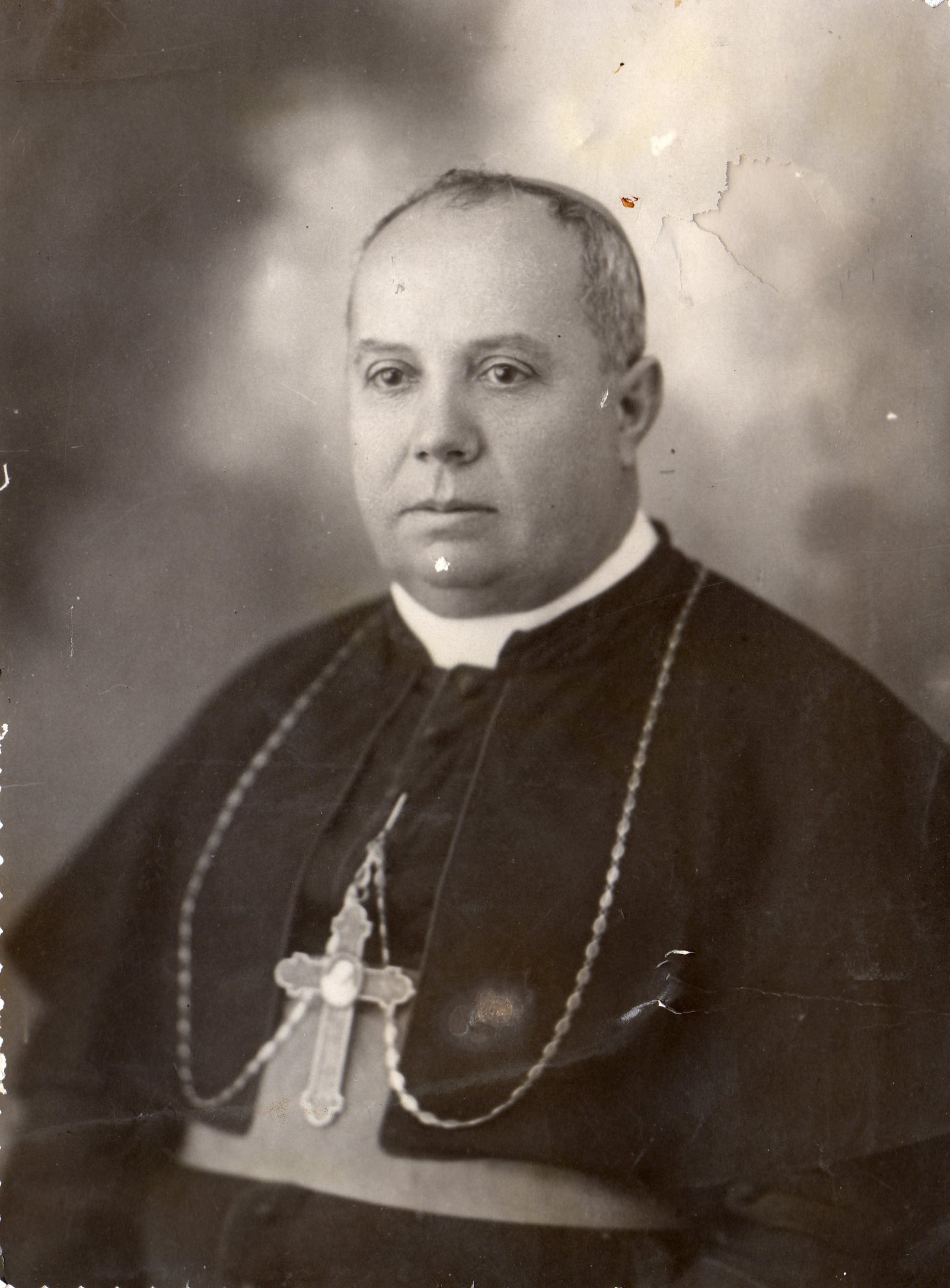
- Church: Roman Catholic Church
- Diocese: Caltanissetta
- See: Caltanissetta
- Appointed: 18 March 1921
- Installed: 28 September 1921
- Retired: 21 August 1956
- Predecessor: Antonio Augusto Intreccialagli
- Successor: Francesco Monaco
- Other post: Titular Archbishop of Mocissus (1956-57)
- Previous post: Bishop of Molfetta (1918-21)

Orders
- Ordination: 20 September 1902 by Giuseppe Francica-Nava de Bontifè
- Consecration: 8 September 1918 by Giuseppe Francica-Nava de Bontifè
- Rank: Bishop (1918-56); Archbishop (1956-57)

Personal details
- Born: Giovanni Jacono; 14 March 1873 Ragusa, Kingdom of Italy
- Died: 25 May 1957 (aged 84) Ragusa, Italy
- Motto: Super Omnia caritas

Sainthood
- Venerated in: Roman Catholic Church
- Title as Saint: Venerable
- Attributes: Episcopal attire

Ordination history of Giovanni Jacono
History
Priestly ordination
- Ordained by: Giuseppe Francica-Nava de Bontifè
Episcopal consecration
- Principal consecrator: Giuseppe Francica-Nava de Bontifè
- Co-consecrators: Luigi Bignami; Emilio Ferrais
Episcopal succession
Bishops consecrated by Giovanni Jacono as principal consecrator
- Pietro Capizzi: 8 January 1933
- Giovanni Rizzo: 16 June 1946

Giovanni Jacono (14 March 1873 – 25 May 1957) was an Italian Roman Catholic prelate who served as the Bishop of Caltanissetta from 1921 until he resigned due to age in 1956. Jacono also served prior to this as the Bishop of Molfetta after World War I and had worked in a trade before entering the priesthood. He was noted for his kindness and for his humble disposition; his holiness was evident to his flock during his episcopal tenure.

His reputation for holiness endured in the decades after Jacono's death and this led to the introduction of his beatification cause in Caltanissetta on 24 October 2007; he was titled as a Servant of God. Pope Francis named him as Venerable on 7 November 2018 upon confirming that Jacono lived a life of heroic virtue.

== Life ==
Giovanni Jacono was born in Ragusa on 14 March 1873 to humble parents. He was baptized on the date of his birth in the church of San Giovanni.

He did mandated service with the armed forces following the completion of his high school education and it was following this that he asked the Archbishop of Catania Giuseppe Francica-Nava de Bontifè if he could commence his ecclesial studies. The archbishop allowed this and Jacono commenced his education. He first worked in a trade as a mason after high school despite harboring desires to become a priest. During this time he encountered his old schoolteacher who helped him enroll in a technical school in Ragusa. But his call to the priesthood grew stronger and so he acted upon it; he had not acted on it in the past because he deemed it improbable to have materialized. He became a porter and slept behind the main door each night. He had to undo his bed each morning since the bed could not be left there. Nava ordained Jacono to the priesthood in 1902 in Catania in San Giovanni la Punta and then sent the new priest to Rome to the Pontifical Roman Athenaeum S. Apollinare to complete further studies. It was in that school that he befriended Angelo Giuseppe Roncalli – the future Pope John XXIII.

He returned to Catania following the completion of his studies where he was made a spiritual director for seminarians and a canon for the archdiocesan cathedral; he was later appointed as a rector. Pope Benedict XV later named Jacono in 1918 as the Bishop of Molfetta; he received his episcopal consecration from Nava in the metropolitan cathedral before his installation in his new see. The pope later named him as the Bishop of Caltanissetta in 1921 and Jacono was enthroned in that new see on that following 28 September. His predecessor (now Venerable) Antonio Augusto Intreccialagli defined him as "a true man of God" in a letter to Ms. Antonietta Mazzone (whom he would later encounter on one occasion). Jacono became noted for his deep devotion to his faith as well as for his kindness and his humble disposition. This made him an accessible individual for his people and there were often crowds when he was in the confessional booth. In late 1928 he granted the Extreme Unction and an apostolic benediction to Cardinal Nava on his deathbed; he attended Nava's funeral not long after and was the homilist.

It became clear over time that his age was preventing him from some of the duties required of him. To that end Pope Pius XII – in 1953 – named Francesco Monaco as Jacono's coadjutor bishop with the right of succession upon Jacono's death or resignation. It proved to be the latter for Jacono resigned in 1956 and returned to Ragusa. But Pius XII also elevated him "ad personam" to the rank of archbishop and named Jacono as the Titular Archbishop of Mocissus (a ceremonial position).

Jacono died in Ragusa in mid-1957 and left no last will; there was but one thing found on his desk: an envelope with 15 000 lira enclosed. There was written on the envelope: "For the poor of Saint Vincent". His remains were interred in the Ragusa Cathedral.

== Beatification process ==
The beatification process opened under Pope Benedict XVI on 24 October 2007 after the Congregation for the Causes of Saints titled Jacono as a Servant of God and declared nihil obstat (no objections) to the cause. On the same date came a decree that transferred the forum for the cause from Ragusa (where Jacono died) to Caltanissetta (where Jacono served as its bishop). The diocesan process was inaugurated on 13 January 2008 and closed on 27 September 2012 before documentation from the investigation was sent to the C.C.S. who validated the process in Rome on 11 April 2014.

The postulation later compiled and submitted the Positio dossier to the C.C.S. for evaluation in 2017 and the theologians met and approved the dossier on 19 April 2018. Pope Francis titled Jacono as Venerable on 7 November 2018 after confirming that the late prelate had lived a life of heroic virtue.

The current postulator for this cause is the Discalced Carmelite priest Romano Gambalunga.
