= Francesco Carpino =

Catholic archbishop (1905–1993)

His Eminence Francesco Carpino
- Archbishop Emeritus of Palermo
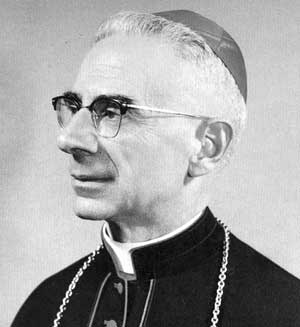
- Church: Roman Catholic Church
- Archdiocese: Palermo
- See: Palermo
- Appointed: 26 June 1967
- Term ended: 17 October 1970
- Predecessor: Ernesto Ruffini
- Successor: Salvatore Pappalardo
- Other post: Cardinal-Bishop of Albano (1978–93)
- Previous posts: Titular Archbishop of Nicomedia (1951); Coadjutor Archbishop of Monreale (1951); Archbishop of Monreale (1951–61); Secretary of the Pontifical Commission for Latin America (1961–67); Assessor of the Consistorial Congregation (1961–65); Titular Archbishop of Serdica (1961–67); Secretary of the College of Cardinals (1961–67); President of the Commission of Cardinals for the Pontifical Shrines of Pompeii and Loreto (1962–69); Secretary of the Consistorial Congregation (1965–67); Pro-Prefect of the Congregation for Sacramental Discipline (1967); Cardinal-Priest of Santa Maria Ausiliatrice in Via Tuscolana pro hac vice (1967–78)

Orders
- Ordination: 14 August 1927 by Giuseppe Vizzini
- Consecration: 8 April 1951 by Adeodato Giovanni Piazza
- Created cardinal: 26 June 1967 by Pope Paul VI
- Rank: Cardinal-Priest (1967–78); Cardinal-Bishop (1978–93)

Personal details
- Born: Francesco Carpino; 18 May 1905 Palazzolo Acreide, Monti Iblei, Siracusa, Kingdom of Italy
- Died: 5 October 1993 (aged 88) Rome, Italy
- Buried: Palermo Cathedral (since 1998)
- Parents: Salvatore Carpino; Maria Odigitria Cascino
- Education: Pontifical Roman Seminary; Pontifical Lateran University
- Motto: Fructum affert in patientia
- Coat of arms

Styles of Francesco Carpino
- Reference style: His Eminence
- Spoken style: Your Eminence
- Informal style: Cardinal
- See: Albano (Suburbicarian diocese)

Francesco Carpino S.T.D. (18 May 1905 – 5 October 1993) was a Roman Catholic Cardinal and Archbishop of Palermo (and later Cardinal Bishop of the title of suburbicarian see of Albano).

== Biography ==
He was born in Palazzolo Acreide, Sicily, Italy as the third of five children of Salvatore Carpino, who was the owner of a small rural estate. He was educated at the Seminary of Noto from 1914 to 1919. He continued to 1926 his studies at the Pontifical Roman Seminary in Rome, where he earned doctorates in philosophy and theology and a licentiate in canon law. He returned to his diocese in 1926 and became professor in the local seminary, until he reached the canonical age for the priestly ordination. He received the diaconate on 29 June 1927, and was ordained on 14 August 1927.

== Priesthood ==
After his ordination, he worked in pastoral ministry in the diocese of Noto and as a faculty member of its seminary from 1927 until 1929. He was appointed that same year as professor of sacramental theology at the Pontifical Lateran Athenaeum, where he remained until 1951. During his time in Rome, he worked in pastoral ministry as well as with several congregations of the Roman Curia. He was created Privy Chamberlain of His Holiness on 27 April 1939.

== Episcopate ==
Pope Pius XII appointed him titular archbishop of Nicomedia and coadjutor bishop of Monreale on 11 February 1951. He succeeded to the metropolitan see of Monreale on 23 August of that year. In 1961, he was named Titular Archbishop of Sardica and appointed Secretary of the Sacred College of Cardinals on 25 October 1961, thus he served as secretary of the 1963 papal conclave. He was a counselor of the Pontifical Preparatory Commission of the Second Vatican Council from 1961 until 1964. He attended the Second Vatican Council. Pope Paul VI appointed him Pro-Prefect of the Congregation for Divine Worship and the Discipline of the Sacraments on 7 April 1967.

== Cardinalate ==
He was created Cardinal-Priest of Santa Maria Ausiliatrice in Via Tuscolana (a deaconry elevated pro hac vice to title) in the consistory of 26 June 1967 by Pope Paul VI. That same day he was appointed Archbishop of Palermo. He resigned the government of the archdiocese, in 1970. He explained that an archdiocese with many difficult pastoral problems needed a young archbishop to prepare programs for the long term. He was named Cardinal Bishop of the title of the suburbicarian see of Albano on 27 January 1978. He took part in the conclaves that elected Pope John Paul I and Pope John Paul II in August and October. He lost the right to participate any future conclaves when turned 80 years of age in 1985.

He died on 5 October 1993 in Rome. His funeral mass, presided over by Pope John Paul II, and concelebrated by thirty cardinals and numerous archbishops and bishops, took place in the patriarchal Vatican basilica at 5:30 pm on 7 October 1993. The cardinal's body was flown to Monreale on 8 October and transferred to Palermo, where another funeral took place in that cathedral celebrated by Salvatore Cassisa, archbishop of Monreale, and Cardinal Salvatore Pappalardo, archbishop of Palermo, and almost all the bishops of Sicily. After the funeral in Palermo, the body was taken to Palazzolo Acreide and a requiem mass was celebrated in the church of San Paolo by Giuseppe Costanzo, archbishop of Siracusa, before the burial in the tomb of his family. On 14 September 1998, the remains were transferred to the metropolitan cathedral of Palermo.

Catholic Church titles
Preceded by Ernesto Eugenio Filippi	Archbishop of Monreale; 23 August 1951 – 19 January 1961	Succeeded by Corrado Mingo
Preceded by Benedetto Aloisi Masella	Pro-Prefect of the Congregation for Divine Worship and the Discipline of the Sacraments; 7 April 1967 – 26 June 1967	Succeeded by Francis John Brennan
Preceded by Ernesto Ruffini	Archbishop of Palermo; 26 June 1967 – 17 October 1970	Succeeded by Salvatore Pappalardo
Preceded by Luigi Traglia	Cardinal-Bishop of Albano; 27 January 1978 – 5 October 1993	Succeeded by Angelo Sodano
