= Francesco Monaco (born 1898) =

Italian Roman Catholic bishop

- Bishop of Caltanissetta
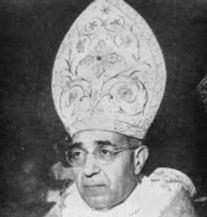
- Church: Catholic Church
- Diocese: Diocese of Caltanissetta
- In office: 2 October 1956 – 21 December 1973
- Predecessor: Giovanni Jacono
- Successor: Alfredo Maria Garsia
- Previous posts: Titular Bishop of Germa in Galatia (1953-1956); Coadjutor Bishop of Caltanissetta (1953-1956)

Orders
- Ordination: 15 February 1925
- Consecration: 24 February 1954 by Clemente Gaddi

Personal details
- Born: 5 August 1898 Agira, Province of Catania, Kingdom of Italy
- Died: 9 February 1986 (aged 87) Catania, Province of Catania, Italy

Francesco Monaco (5 August 1898, Agira - 9 February 1986, Catania) was an Italian Roman Catholic bishop.

He was ordained priest on 15 February 1925. Pope Pius XII appointed him titular bishop of Germensis in Galatia and coadjutor bishop of Caltanissetta on 12 December 1953 and he was consecrated by bishop Clemente Gaddi on 24 February the following year. He laid down both posts when he was made bishop of Caltanissetta in 1956, a role he then held until his retirement in 1973.
