= Alfredo Maria Garsia =

Italian Roman Catholic bishop

- Bishop of Caltanissetta
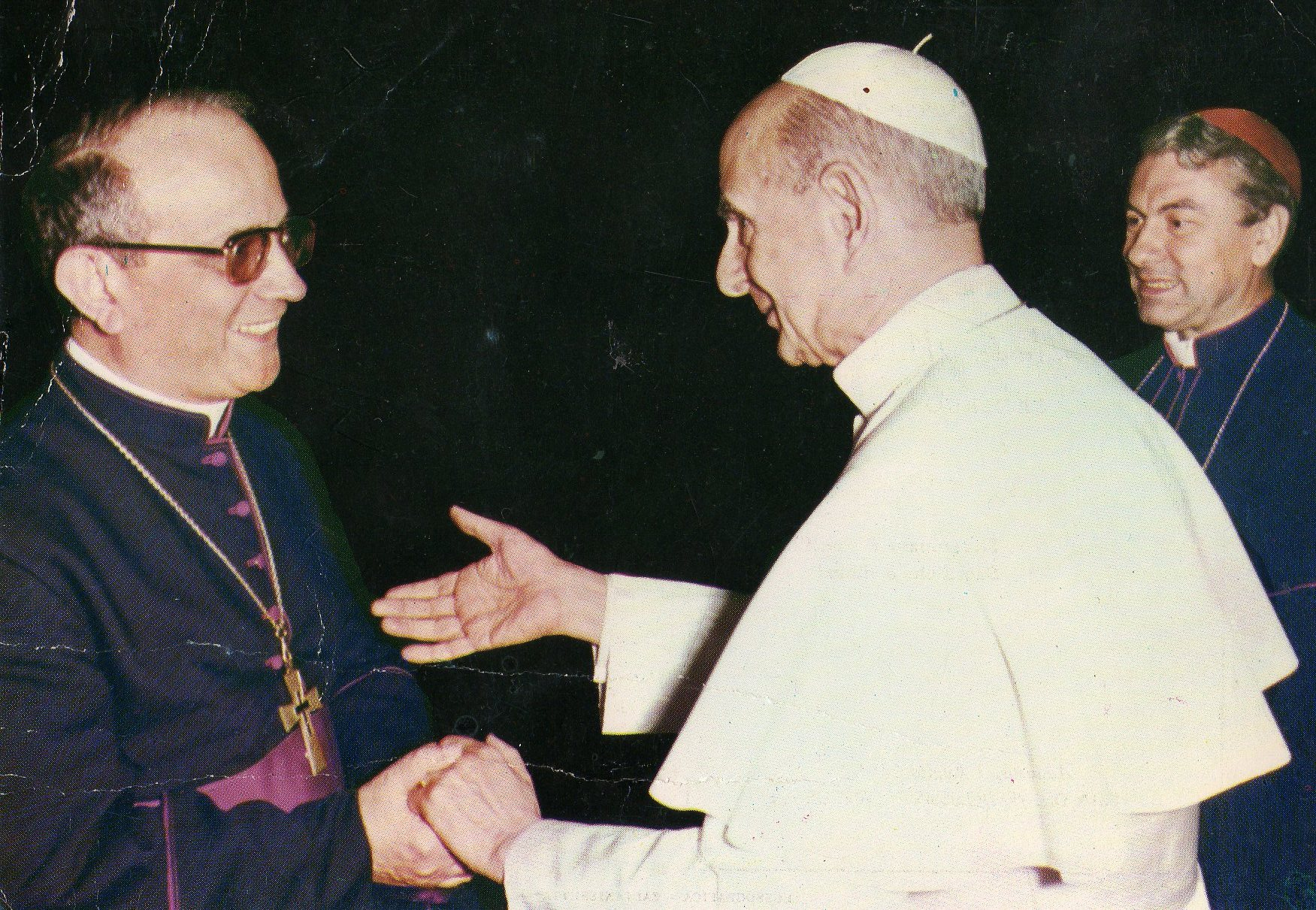
- Bishop Garsia (left) shaking the hand of Pope Paul VI. To the right is Cardinal Salvatore Pappalardo
- Church: Catholic Church
- Diocese: Diocese of Caltanissetta
- In office: 21 December 1973 – 2 August 2003
- Predecessor: Francesco Monaco
- Successor: Mario Russotto

Orders
- Ordination: 1 July 1951
- Consecration: 2 February 1974 by Salvatore Pappalardo

Personal details
- Born: 14 January 1928 Augusta, Province of Syracuse, Kingdom of Italy
- Died: 4 June 2004 (aged 76) Augusta, Province of Syracuse, Italy

Alfredo Maria Garsia (14 January 1928 in Augusta, Sicily – 4 June 2004 in Augusta, Sicily) was an Italian Roman Catholic priest and bishop.

== Life ==
He was ordained a priest on 1 July 1951.

Pope Paul VI appointed him bishop of Caltanissetta on 21 December 1973, and he was consecrated on 2 February 1974 by Cardinal Salvatore Pappalardo. He remained bishop of the diocese until his retirement on 2 August 2003, guiding it through the enactment of the decrees of the Second Vatican Council, and overseeing a visit by pope John Paul II. He held a diocesan synod.

He was also president of the Fondazione Migrantes of the Italian Episcopal Conference.

He died in 2004, and his funeral and burial were held in Caltanissetta Cathedral, by Cardinal Salvatore De Giorgi and other bishops.
