= Francesco Pieri =

Italian Roman Catholic bishop

- Bishop of Orvieto
- Church: Catholic Church
- Diocese: Diocese of Orvieto
- In office: 6 December 1941 – 15 May 1961
- Predecessor: Salvatore Fratocchi
- Successor: Virginio Dondeo
- Previous posts: Titular Bishop of Germa in Galatia (1941); Coadjutor Bishop of Orvieto (1941)

Orders
- Ordination: 3 April 1926
- Consecration: 26 January 1941 by Raffaele Rossi

Personal details
- Born: 3 June 1902 Acquapendente, Kingdom of Italy
- Died: 15 May 1961 (aged 58) Acquapendente, Province of Viterbo, Italy

Francesco Pieri (3 June 1902, Acquapendente - 15 May 1961, Acquapendente) was an Italian Roman Catholic bishop. From 1941 until his death, he was the bishop of Orvieto.
