= Antonio Augusto Intreccialagli =

Italian Roman Catholic prelate

Venerable Antonio Augusto Intreccialagli O.C.D.
- Archbishop of Monreale
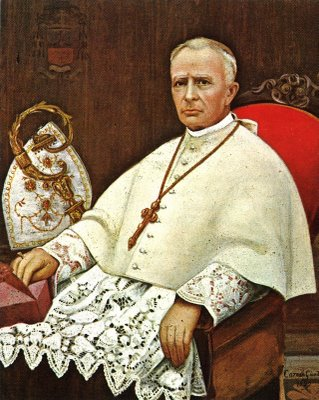
- Church: Roman Catholic Church
- Archdiocese: Monreale
- See: Monreale
- Appointed: 31 July 1919
- Term ended: 19 September 1924
- Predecessor: Domenico Gaspare Lancia di Brolo
- Successor: Ernesto Eugenio Filippi
- Previous posts: Bishop of Caltanissetta (1907−14); Titular Archbishop of Serdica (1914−19); Coadjutor Archbishop of Monreale (1914−19); Apostolic Administrator of Caltanissetta (1914−21)

Orders
- Ordination: 22 May 1875 by Domenico Mignanti
- Consecration: 28 July 1907 by Girolamo Maria Gotti

Personal details
- Born: Antonio Augusto Intreccialagli; 18 February 1852 Montecompatri, Rome, Papal States
- Died: 19 September 1924 (aged 72) Monreale, Palermo, Kingdom of Italy
- Buried: Monreale Cathedral
- Education: Pontifical Gregorian University

Sainthood
- Venerated in: Roman Catholic Church
- Title as Saint: Venerable
- Attributes: Discalced Carmelite habit; Episcopal attire

Ordination history of Antonio Augusto Intreccialagli
History
Priestly ordination
- Ordained by: Domenico Mignanti
- Date: 22 May 1875
- Place: Civita Castellana Cathedral, Kingdom of Italy
Episcopal consecration
- Principal consecrator: Girolamo Maria Gotti
- Co-consecrators: Alessandro Beniamino Zanecchia-Ginnetti; Rinaldo Camillo Rousset
- Date: 28 July 1907
Episcopal succession
Bishops consecrated by Antonio Augusto Intreccialagli as principal consecrator
- Giuseppe Scarlata: 30 January 1912

Antonio Augusto Intreccialagli (18 February 1852 − 19 September 1924) - religious name Antonio di Gesù - was an Italian Roman Catholic prelate and professed member from the Discalced Carmelites who served as the Archbishop of Monreale from 1919 until his death. Intreccialagli served prior to this as the coadjutor for the archdiocese and before that served as the Bishop of Caltanissetta when he was nominated to the episcopate. He was also the co-founder of the Oblates to the Divine Love which he established alongside the Servant of God Margherita Diomira Crispi.

Intreccialagli's process for beatification opened after his death in Monreale, as a Servant of God. He was later titled as Venerable in 1991 after Pope John Paul II confirmed that he had lived a life of heroic virtue.

== Life ==
Antonio Augusto Intreccialagli was born in 1852 in Montecompatri as the first of ten children born to Giuseppe Intreccialagli and Annunziata Raffaelli. He made his First Communion in 1862 after having received his Confirmation in 1858.

In 1867 he entered the Discalced Carmelites (one brother also entered the order) at their convent at Santa Maria della Scala in Rome and assumed the religious name "Antonio di Gesù" upon commencing his period of novitiate. On 19 January 1868 he was vested in the habit for the first time in Santa Maria della Scala. In 1868 he began his philosophical and theological studies in Caprarola and later made his initial profession on 20 January 1868. He made his solemn profession into the order on 20 January 1869 in Santa Maria della Scala into the hands of Fr. Domenico di San Giuseppe.

On 19 June 1873 he and some companions sought refuge in the stables at the Farnese Palace after the Caprarola convent was closed in 1872. For months the seminarians ate onions and sometimes starved, but he was noted for keeping his fellows occupied with his good humor.

Intreccialagli was ordained into the priesthood in 1875 in the Civita Castellana Cathedral by the diocesan bishop, and after ordination lived for a time in the convent attached to Santa Maria della Vittoria while finishing his studies at the Pontifical Gregorian University. People often came to him in the convent churches of Santa Maria della Scala and Santa Maria della Vittoria for advice and spiritual direction. People such as Saint Frances Xavier Cabrini and Blessed Maria Therese von Wüllenweber came to see him as did Blessed Francis Jordan, the founder of the Society of the Divine Savior. He was also friends with Blessed Teresa Maria Manetti. He later became the prior for Santa Maria della Scala in 1885 (he was re-elected in 1888) and after that term expired spent a brief period in both Caprarola (to teach) and Montecompatri (as the vicar for the San Silvestro convent from 1883 to 1885). He later was made the provincial for the Roman province of the Discalced Carmelites in 1891 and served two consecutive terms) in office after being re-elected twice in 1897 and 1903. Pope Leo XIII later named him in 1896 as a consulter for both the Congregation for Bishops and Regulars and for the Congregation for Rites. He opened a new convent in Ceprano in 1893 and later allowed in 1906 for the order to return to the ancient Basilica di San Valentino in Terni. From 1902 until 1907 he was the order's general postulator which saw him oversee the order's causes for canonization.

Just prior to his episcopal nomination the order held its General Chapter in Rome to elect a new Superior General. Pope Pius X—who knew Intreccialagli well and held him in high esteem—made it clear to the order of his desire to see him elected to the position. This never materialized so the pope said that if the order "did not want him then I'll take him". The pope sent a handwritten note to him to inform him that he would be appointed as a bishop. This terrified Intreccialagli who went to see the pope in a vain effort to dissuade him from appointing him as a bishop. He relented and received his episcopal consecration as the new Bishop of Caltanissetta a short while later. He visited the pope the following afternoon to thank him. His formal enthronement in his new see was celebrated on 1 November. In Caltanissetta he helped to fund orphanages and travelled to the salt mines to wait for the miners to finish work all so he could meet with them and talk to them. In the aftermath of the 1908 Messina earthquake he welcomed several affected families while he later attempted to help families purchase tickets for immigration to the United States of America.

In 1911 the pope named him as an administrator for the Monreale archdiocese since the archbishop there could no longer perform his duties due to advanced age (he was in his nineties). Intreccialagli held that position until 1914 when the pope named him as the coadjutor bishop (with the right of succession). But his entrance into the archdiocese as coadjutor proved difficult due to the modernist doctrine that was fermenting there. It was also there that he began to rail against the Mafia and their actions. In 1919 the archbishop died and Intreccialagli became the Archbishop of Monreale. He slept for four hours each night and made frequent pastoral visits across his archdiocese. He heard confessions each morning in the church of Saint Joseph and oversaw spiritual guidance for people such as Venerable Marianna Amico Roxas.

In 1924 he felt exhausted and his doctors advised him to rest. In June 1924 he returned for rest to his hometown but later travelled to Palermo that September in order to attend the National Eucharistic Congress that was to be held there. He later wanted to hold Pontifical Vespers on 7 September but his doctors prohibited him from doing so due to his poor health. His fatigue grew and he soon had troubles swallowing to the point where a nun asked if he was suffering. The bishop replied: "I suffer ... it's terrible!" He later wanted the Viaticum on 12 September seated on the edge of his bed in his religious habit but asked those present for pardon before being granted the Viaticum. In the evening on 18 September he renewed his religious vows to his confrere Fr. Guglielmo di San Alberto. Intreccialagli died at 4:00am on 19 September. His remains were later relocated in 1936 to the Monreale Cathedral in the Blessed Sacrament chapel.

== Beatification process ==
The beatification process opened in Monreale in 1952 in an informative process that lasted until 1954. The process collected documents in relation to his life and holiness and also collected a series of witness testimonies to those who either knew the late bishop or could attest to his holiness. Theologians twice approved his spiritual writings in two separate decrees issued on 3 March 1957 and another less than a decade later on 27 February 1964. The formal introduction to the cause came on 14 November 1966 under Pope Paul VI and he became titled as a Servant of God. In Monreale an apostolic process was later conducted from 1975 to 1978 at which point the Congregation for the Causes of Saints validated both processes in Rome on 18 March 1982 prior to receiving the Positio dossier from the postulation in 1987 for assessment.

Theologians approved the cause in a meeting held on 27 March 1990 as did the cardinal and bishop members of the C.C.S. on 6 November 1990. Intreccialagli was named as Venerable on 22 January 1991 after Pope John Paul II confirmed that the late bishop lived a model life of heroic virtue.

== See also ==
- Discalced Carmelites
- Roman Catholic Diocese of Caltanissetta
- Roman Catholic Archdiocese of Monreale
