= Giuseppe Francica-Nava de Bontifè =

Italian Cardinal

His Eminence Giuseppe Francica-Nava de Bontifè
- Archbishop of Catania
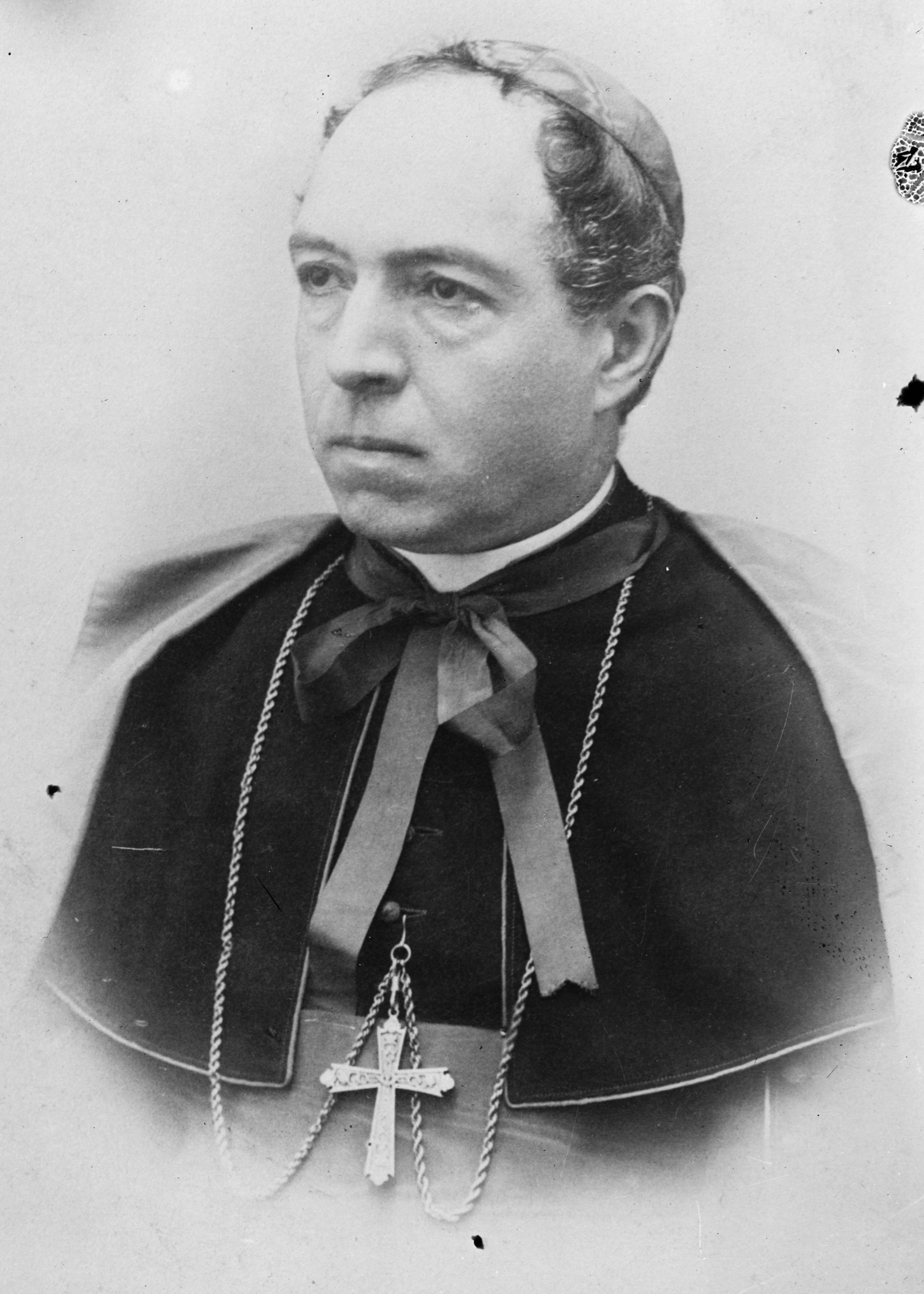
- Church: Roman Catholic Church
- Archdiocese: Catania
- See: Catania
- Appointed: 18 March 1895
- Term ended: 7 December 1928
- Predecessor: Giuseppe Benedetto Dusmet
- Successor: Emilio Ferrais
- Other posts: Cardinal-Priest of Santi Giovanni e Paolo (1899-1928); Cardinal Protopriest (1924-28)
- Previous posts: Titular Bishop of Alabanda (1883-89); Auxiliary Bishop of Caltanssetta (1883-89); Titular Archbishop of Heraclea (1889-95)

Orders
- Ordination: 22 May 1869 by Giovanni Battista Guttadauro di Reburdone
- Consecration: 21 October 1883 by Giovanni Battista Guttadauro di Reburdone
- Created cardinal: 19 June 1899 by Pope Leo XIII
- Rank: Cardinal-Priest

Personal details
- Born: Giuseppe Francica-Nava de Bontifè; 23 July 1846 Catania, Kingdom of the Two Sicilies
- Died: 7 December 1928 (aged 82) Catania, Kingdom of Italy
- Buried: Catania Cathedral
- Parents: Giovanni Raffaele Francica-Nava; Caterina Guattadauro
- Education: Pontifical Gregorian University; Pontifical Roman Athenaeum Saint Apollinare; Pontifical Academy of Ecclesiastical Nobles
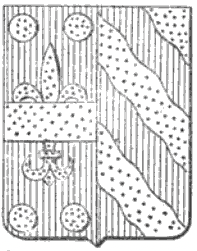
- Coat of arms

Styles of Giuseppe Francica-Nava di Bontifé
- Reference style: His Eminence
- Spoken style: Your Eminence
- Informal style: Cardinal
- See: Catania

Giuseppe Francica-Nava de Bontifè (23 July 1846 – 7 December 1928) was an Italian Cardinal of the Catholic Church who served as Archbishop of Catania from 1895 until his death; he was elevated to the cardinalate in 1899.

== Biography ==
Francica-Nava de Bontifè was born in Catania, Sicily, and received the Sacrament of Confirmation in March 1849. He studied at the seminary in Caltanissetta, from where he obtained his licentiate in theology, and then went to Rome to study at the Pontifical Gregorian University, earning his doctorates in theology, philosophy, and civil and canon law.

Francica was ordained to the priesthood on 22 May 1869. During his studies at the Pontifical Academy of Ecclesiastical Nobles (1870-1880), he served as rector of the Caltanissetta seminary for three years, becoming the pro-vicar general (1877) and later full vicar general of the diocese. After becoming an honorary canon of the diocese's cathedral chapter, he was raised to the rank of Privy Chamberlain of His Holiness in 1876 and Domestic Prelate of His Holiness on 4 March 1879.

On 9 August 1883, Francica was appointed Auxiliary Bishop of Caltanissetta and Titular Bishop of Alabanda by Pope Leo XIII, receiving his episcopal consecration on the following 21 October from Bishop Giovanni Battista Guttadauro di Reburdone. He was promoted to Titular Archbishop of Heraclea on 24 May 1889, and later named Apostolic Nuncio to Belgium on 6 June 1889, Archbishop of Catania on 18 March 1895 as well as Apostolic Nuncio to Spain on 6 August 1896.

Pope Leo created him Cardinal-Priest of Ss. Giovanni e Paolo in the consistory of 19 June 1899. Francica participated in the conclaves of 1903, 1914, and 1922, and also served as Cardinal Protopriest (the longest-serving member of the order of Cardinal Priests) from 19 November 1924 until his death.

Cardinal Francica-Nava de Bontifè died in Catania, at the age of 82; he is buried in the metropolitan cathedral of the same.

== See also ==
- Cardinal electors in Papal conclave, 1914
- Cardinal electors in Papal conclave, 1922
