= Mario Russotto =

Roman Catholic bishop

The Most Reverend Mario Russotto
- Bishop of Caltanissetta
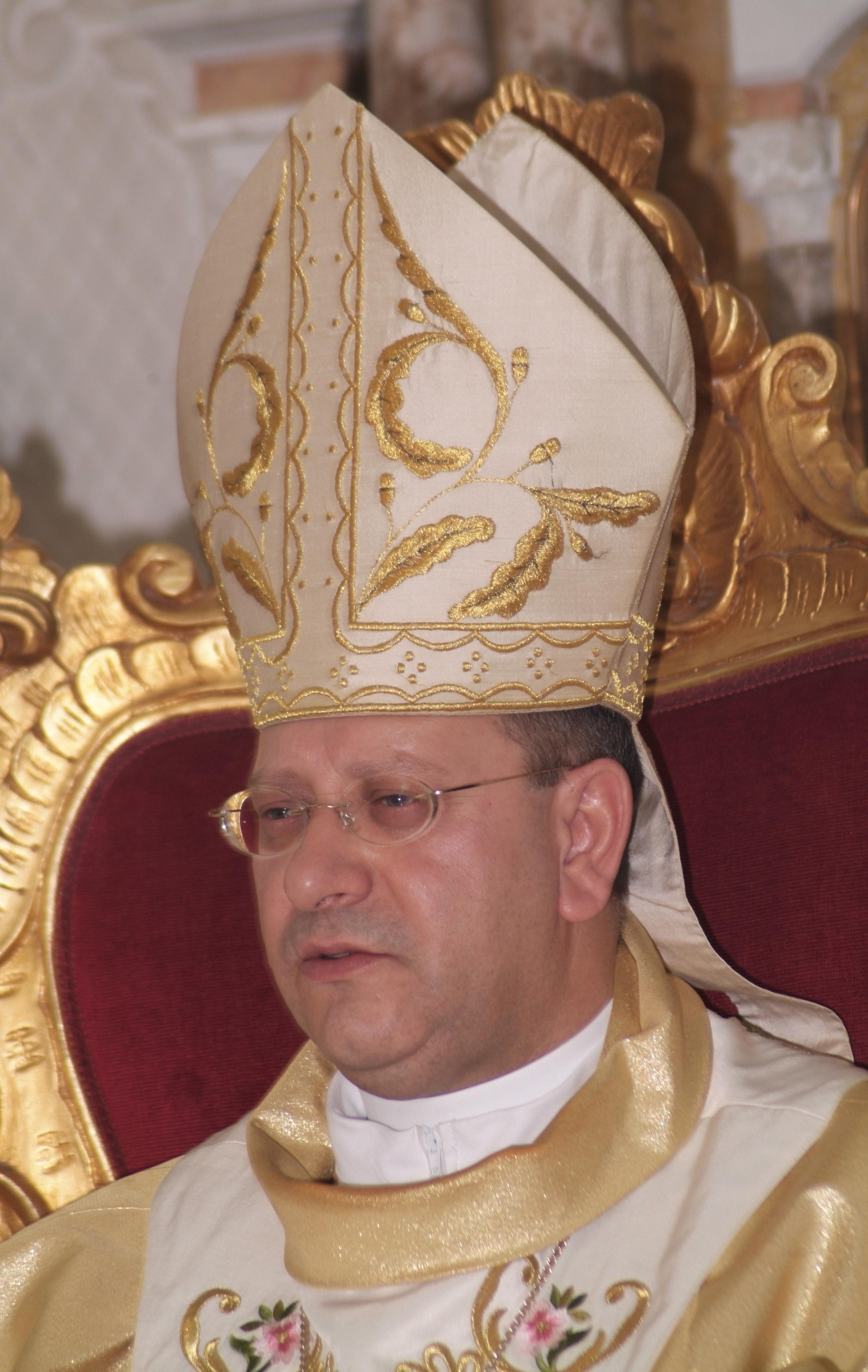
- Church: Roman Catholic Church
- Archdiocese: Agrigento
- Metropolis: Agrigento
- See: Caltanissetta
- Appointed: 2 August 2003
- Installed: 27 September 2003
- Predecessor: Alfredo Maria Garsia

Orders
- Ordination: 29 June 1981 by Angelo Rizzo
- Consecration: 27 September 2003 by Salvatore De Giorgi

Personal details
- Born: Mario Russotto; 23 July 1957 (age 69) Vittoria, Sicily, Italy
- Denomination: Roman Catholic
- Motto: Latin: In verbis tuis meditabor
- Coat of arms: Mario Russotto's coat of arms

Ordination history of Mario Russotto
History
Priestly ordination
- Ordained by: Angelo Rizzo
Episcopal consecration
- Principal consecrator: Salvatore De Giorgi
- Co-consecrators: Salvatore Pappalardo; Paolo Romeo
Episcopal succession
Bishops consecrated by Mario Russotto as principal consecrator
- Francesco Lomanto: 24 October 2020

Mario Russotto (23 July 1957) is a Roman Catholic bishop. He was ordained priest on 29 June 1981 by bishop Angelo Rizzo. He was appointed bishop of Caltanissetta on 2 August 2003 by Pope John Paul II and consecrated on 27 September 2003 by cardinal Salvatore De Giorgi.
