= Ernesto Eugenio Filippi =

Italian prelate of the Catholic Church

- Archbishop of Monreale
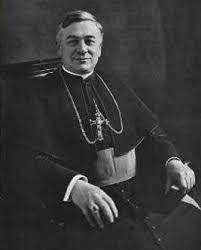
- Church: Catholic Church
- Archdiocese: Archdiocese of Monreale
- In office: 6 April 1925 – 23 August 1951
- Predecessor: Antonio Augusto Intreccialagli
- Successor: Francesco Carpino
- Previous posts: Apostolic Delegate to Constantinople (1923-1925); Titular Archbishop of Serdica (1921-1925); Apostolic Delegate to Mexico (1921-1923)

Orders
- Ordination: 21 September 1901
- Consecration: 7 August 1921 by Gaetano de Lai

Personal details
- Born: 17 May 1879 Collelongo, Province of L'Aquila, Kingdom of Italy
- Died: 23 August 1951 (aged 72)

Ernesto Eugenio Filippi (17 May 1879 – 23 August 1951) was an Italian prelate of the Catholic Church who served as Archbishop of Monreale in Sicily from 1925 until his death in 1951. He also worked briefly in the diplomatic service of the Holy See, as Apostolic Delegate to Mexico from 1921 to 1923 and Apostolic Delegate to Constantinople from 1923 to 1925.

== Biography ==
Ernesto Eugenio Filippi was born on 17 May 1879 in Collelongo, Italy. He was ordained a priest on 21 September 1901.

On 22 July 1921, Pope Benedict XV appointed him titular archbishop of Serdica and Apostolic Delegate to Mexico. He received his episcopal consecration on 7 August 1921.

He initially established cordial relations with the government, but was quickly drawn into the contentious relationship between the Church hierarchy and the anti-clerical political establishment. The government was enforcing a ban on political movements with a religious affiliation, which restricted the ability of Catholic lay associations to advocate for change in Church-state relations. In response, clandestine Catholic associations were operating with the almost universal support of the Mexican bishops and sometimes under their leadership. Filippi was suspicious of this approach from the first and as he gathered information he only became more negative, fearful of provoking further government repression, especially if he was correct in believing that the associations sheltered advocates of violent revolution. Before he could report fully to his superiors in Rome, he ran afoul of a different government restriction. For decades, Mexico had banned religious rites in public. In January 1923, when he had been in Mexico more than a year, Filippi led a group of bishops in blessing the cornerstone of a monument to Christ the King being constructed on a hillside near Silao. The government of President Alvaro Obregón deemed this a violation of its prohibition on public religious ceremonies and deported Filippi, provoking popular protests.

On 31 March 1923, Pope Pius XI named him Apostolic Delegate to Constantinople.

On 6 April 1925, Pope Pius appointed him Archbishop of Monreale. On 11 February 1951, Pope Pius XII appointed Francesco Carpino to serve as Archbishop Coadjutor there.

He died on 23 August 1951 at the age of 72.
