= Archdiocese of Monreale =

Roman Catholic archdiocese in Italy

Coordinates: 38.0833°N 13.2833°E

Archdiocese of Monreale Archidioecesis Montis Regalis

Catholic
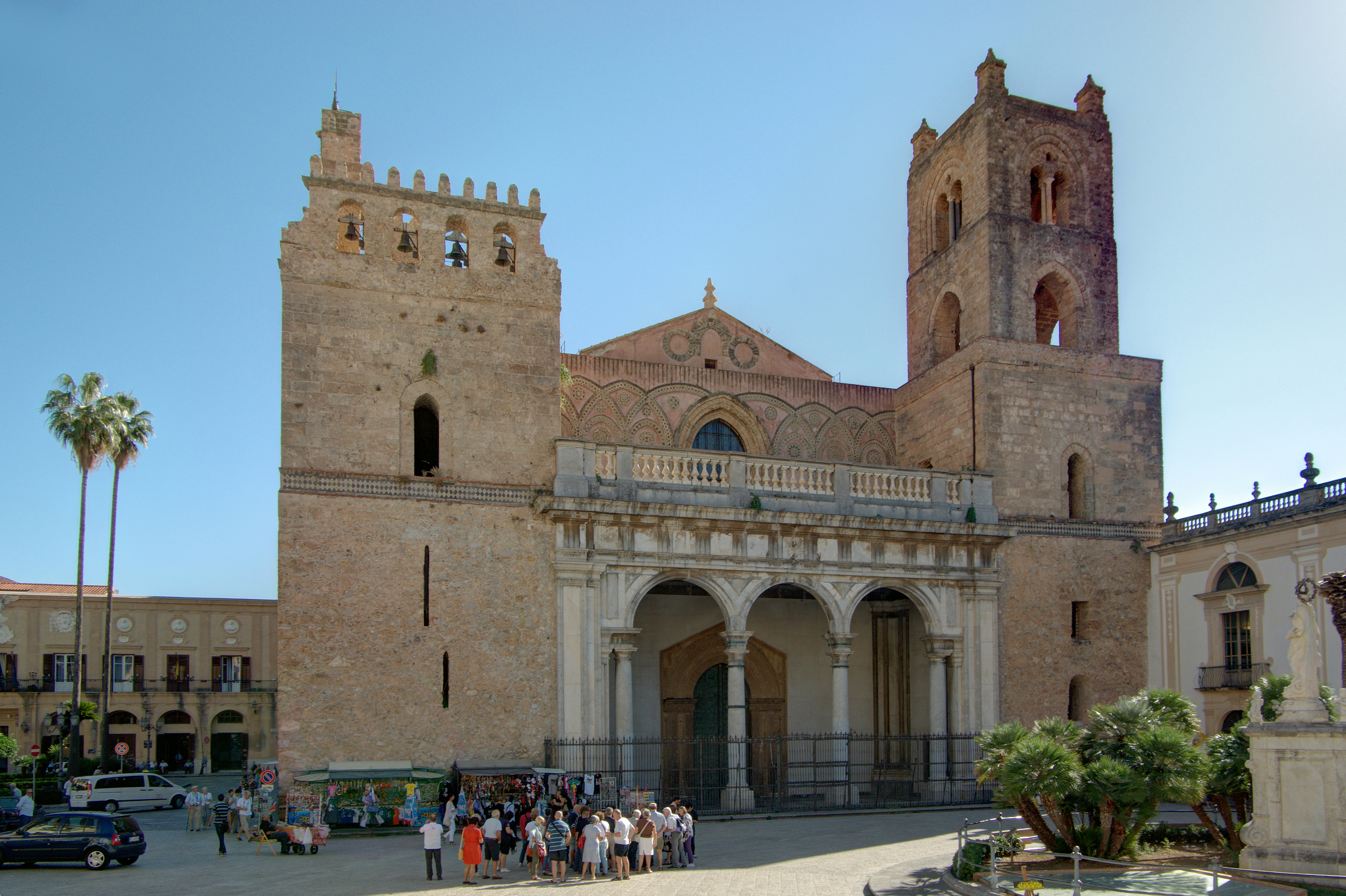
- Monreale Cathedral

Location
- Country: Italy
- Ecclesiastical province: Palermo

Statistics
- Area: 1,509 km^{2} (583 sq mi)
- Population: Total; Catholics: (as of 2013); 258,368; 255,150 (est.) (98.8%)
- Parishes: 69

Information
- Denomination: Catholic Church
- Rite: Roman Rite
- Established: 1176 (849–850 years ago)
- Cathedral: Basilica Cattedrale di S. Maria La Nuova
- Secular priests: 110 (diocesan); 26 (Religious Orders); 11 Permanent Deacons

Current leadership
- Pope: Leo XIV
- Archbishop: Gualtiero Isacchi
- Bishops emeritus: Michele Pennisi; Salvatore Di Cristina

Map
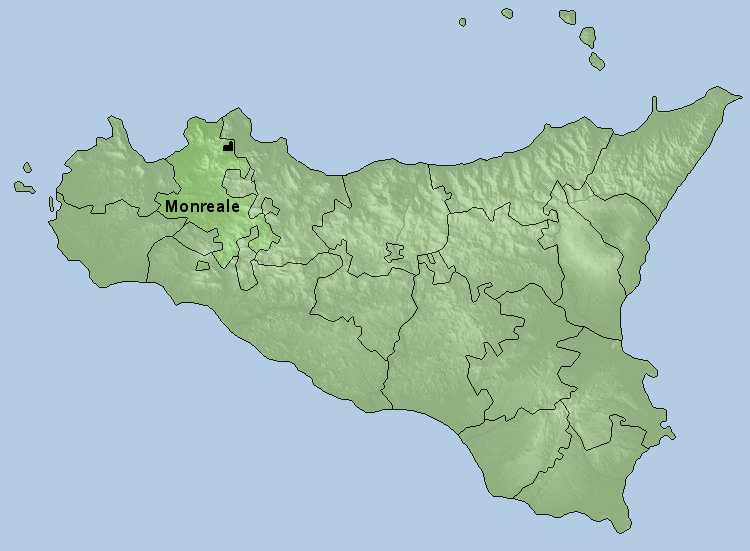

Website
- www.diocesimonreale.it

The Archdiocese of Monreale (Latin: Archidioecesis Montis Regalis) is a Latin archdiocese of the Catholic Church in Sicily. As of 2000 it is no longer a metropolitan see, and is now a suffragan of the Archdiocese of Palermo.

== History ==
In 1174 the abbey of Monreale was declared a prælatura nullius; two years later its abbot was vested with the title and jurisdiction of a bishop. On 2 February 1183, thanks to the Bull Licet Dominus of Pope Lucius III, Monreale became the metropolitan see for the diocese of Catania and the diocese of Siracusa. At first the archbishops were elected by the monks, but were not always Benedictines; since 1275 the election has been reserved to itself by the Holy See.

In time the diocese of Girgenti and diocese of Caltagirone also became suffragan to Monreale; but Siracusa, in 1844, and Catania, in 1860, became archiepiscopal sees. The former having become the metropolitan of Caltagirone, Monreale received the new diocese of Caltanisetta (1860), which see and Girgenti became its only suffragans.

From 1775 to 1802 Monreale and Palermo were united under a single archbishop.

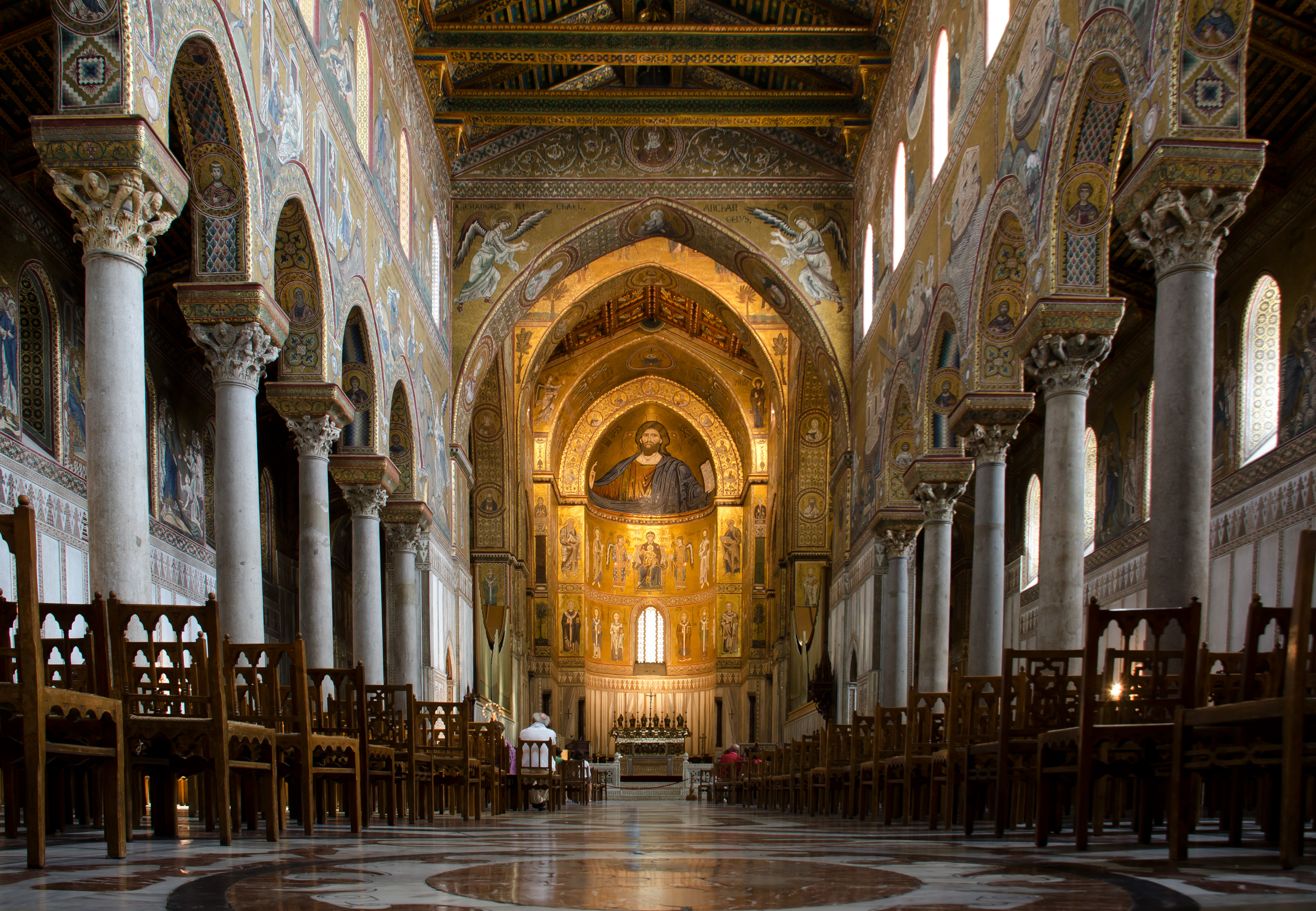
Monreale Cathedral

== Bishops and Archbishops ==
=== Diocese of Monreale ===
Erected: 1176
Latin Name: Montis Regalis

- Theobaldus, O.S.B. (1176 – 14 May 1178)
- Guillelmus, O.S.B. (1178 – 1183) (promoted archbishop)

=== Archdiocese of Monreale ===
Elevated: 5 February 1183
Latin Name: Montis Regalis

=== to 1500 ===
- Guillelmus, O.S.B. (4 February 1183 – 28 October 1191)
- Carus, O.S.B. (23 May 1194 – after 3 August 1222)

Sede vacante (by 10 October 1239 – after 25 November 1254)

- Benevenutus (10 August 1258 – 24 July 1260)
- Gaufridus de Bellomonte (1 October 1266 – 6 November 1271)
- Trasmundus (by 10 May 1267 – 17 August 1269)

Sede vacante (17 August 1269 – 13 August 1278)

- Giovanni Boccamazza (15 Aug 1278 – Aug 1286 Resigned)
- Pietro Gerra (20 Aug 1286 – 6 Jan 1298 Appointed, Archbishop of Capua)
- Rogerius Donmusco (10 January 1304 – 1304)
- Arnaldus de Rassaco (17 February 1306 – 1324).
- Neapoleone Fortibracchia Orsini (26 July 1325 – 1337)
- Manuel Spinola (4 November 1338 – April 1362)
- Guilelmus Monstrius (1363 – 1380) (Avignon Obedience)
- Franciscus Riguerii, O.Min. (19 November 1380 – 19 December 1384) (Avignon Obedience)
- Paulus Francisci de Roma, O.Min. (3 February 1379 – April 1418) (Roman Obedience)
- Giovanni Ventimiglia (2 April 1418 – 25 January 1450)
- Alfonsus de Cuevasruvias (11 February 1450 – November 1454)
- Joannes Soler (3 January 1455 – 1458)
- Ausias Despuig (18 Sep 1458 – 2 Sep 1483 Died)
- Juan de Borja Lanzol (13 Sep 1483 – 1 Aug 1503 Died)

=== 1500 to 1700 ===
- Cardinal Juan Castellar y de Borja (9 Aug 1503 – 1 Jan 1505 Died)
- Alfonso de Aragona (1505 – 1511) (Administrator)
- Cardinal Enrique de Cardona y Enríquez (23 Jan 1512 – 7 Feb 1530 Died)
- Cardinal Pompeo Colonna (14 Dec 1530 – 28 Jun 1532 Died)
- Cardinal Ippolito de' Medici (26 Jul 1532 – 10 Aug 1535 Died) (Administrator)
- Cardinal Alessandro Farnese (15 May 1536 – 9 Dec 1573 Resigned)
- Ludovico de Torres (I) (9 Dec 1573 – 31 Dec 1583 Died)
- Cardinal Ludovico de Torres (II) (22 Jan 1588 – 8 Jul 1609 Died)
- Arcangelo Gualtieri, O.F.M. (18 Jun 1612 – 9 December 1617 Died)
- Jerónimo Venero Leyva (17 Feb 1620 – Aug 1628 Died)
- Cosimo de Torres (3 Apr 1634 – 1 May 1642 Died)
- Giovanni Torresiglia (Torrecilla Manso) (13 Jul 1644 – 28 Jan 1648 Died)
- Cardinal Francesco Peretti di Montalto (30 May 1650 – 3 May 1655 Died)
- Luis Alfonso de Los Cameros (16 Oct 1656 – 14 May 1668)
- Cardinal Vitaliano Visconti (2 Jun 1670 – 7 Sep 1671 Died)

=== since 1700 ===
- Giovanni Roano e Corrionero (27 Nov 1673 – 4 Jul 1703 Died)
- Cardinal Francesco del Giudice (14 Jan 1704 – 15 Feb 1725 Retired)
- Cardinal Juan Álvaro Cienfuegos Villazón, S.J. (21 Feb 1725 – 24 Apr 1739 Resigned)
- Troiano Acquaviva d'Aragona (4 May 1739 – 20 Mar 1747 Died)
- Giacomo Bonanno, C.R. (28 May 1753 – 14 Jan 1754 Died)
- Francesco Maria Testa (22 Apr 1754 – 17 May 1773 Died)
- Francesco Ferdinando Sanseverino, C.P.O. (15 Apr 1776 – 31 Mar 1793 Died)
  Archbishop of Palermo and of Monreale
- Filippo López y Rojo, C.R. (17 Jun 1793 – 4 Sep 1801 Resigned)
  Archbishop of Palermo and of Monreale
- Mercurio Maria Teresi (24 May 1802 – 17 Apr 1805 Died)
- Domenico Benedetto Balsamo, O.S.B. (23 Sep 1816 – 6 Apr 1844 Died)
- Pier Francesco Brunaccini, O.S.B. (24 Nov 1845 – 14 Jun 1850 Died)
- Benedetto D'Acquisto, O.F.M. (23 Dec 1858 – 7 Aug 1867 Died)
- Giuseppe Maria Papardo del Pacco, C.R. (27 Oct 1871 – 3 Aug 1883 Died)
- Domenico Gaspare Lancia di Brolo, O.S.B. (24 Mar 1884 – 31 Jul 1919 Died)
- Antonio Augusto Intreccialagli, O.C.D. (31 Jul 1919 – 19 Sep 1924 Died)
- Ernesto Eugenio Filippi (6 Apr 1925 – 23 Aug 1951 Died)
- Francesco Carpino (23 Aug 1951 Succeeded – 19 Jan 1961 Appointed, Official of the Sacred Consistorial Congregation)
- Corrado Mingo (28 Apr 1961 – 11 Mar 1978 Retired)
- Salvatore Cassisa (11 Mar 1978 – 24 May 1997 Retired)
- Pio Vittorio Vigo (24 May 1997 – 15 Oct 2002 Appointed, Archbishop (Personal Title) of Acireale)
- Cataldo Naro (18 Oct 2002 – 29 Sep 2006 Died)
- Salvatore Di Cristina (2 Dec 2006 – 8 Feb 2013 Retired)
- Michele Pennisi (8 Feb 2013 – 28 April 2022 Retired)
- Gualtiero Isacchi (28 April 2022 - )

== Auxiliary bishops ==
- Gian Antonio Fassano (4 Jun 1544 – 10 Sep 1568)
- Giovanni Pietro Fortiguerra (4 Jun 1567 – 26 Apr 1574)
- Blas Antonio Olóriz (2 Dec 1733 – )
- Emanuele Romano (20 Jun 1973 – 24 Jan 1978)

== Books ==
=== Reference Works ===
- Eubel, Conradus, ed. (1913). Hierarchia catholica, Tomus 1 (second ed.). Münster: Libreria Regensbergiana. (in Latin)
- Eubel, Conradus, ed. (1914). Hierarchia catholica, Tomus 2 (second ed.). Münster: Libreria Regensbergiana. (in Latin)
- Eubel, Conradus, ed. (1923). Hierarchia catholica, Tomus 3 (second ed.). Münster: Libreria Regensbergiana.
- Gams, Pius Bonifatius (1873). Series episcoporum Ecclesiae catholicae: quotquot innotuerunt a beato Petro apostolo. Ratisbon: Typis et Sumptibus Georgii Josephi Manz. pp. 950–951. (Use with caution; obsolete)
- Gauchat, Patritius (Patrice) (1935). Hierarchia catholica IV (1592-1667). Münster: Libraria Regensbergiana. (in Latin)
- Ritzler, Remigius; Sefrin, Pirminus (1952). Hierarchia catholica medii et recentis aevi V (1667-1730). Patavii: Messagero di S. Antonio. (in Latin)
- Ritzler, Remigius; Sefrin, Pirminus (1958). Hierarchia catholica medii et recentis aevi VI (1730-1799). Patavii: Messagero di S. Antonio. (in Latin)
- Ritzler, Remigius; Sefrin, Pirminus (1968). Hierarchia Catholica medii et recentioris aevi sive summorum pontificum, S. R. E. cardinalium, ecclesiarum antistitum series... A pontificatu Pii PP. VII (1800) usque ad pontificatum Gregorii PP. XVI (1846) (in Latin). Vol. VII. Monasterii: Libr. Regensburgiana.
- Ritzler, Remigius; Pirminus Sefrin (1978). Hierarchia catholica Medii et recentioris aevi... A Pontificatu PII PP. IX (1846) usque ad Pontificatum Leonis PP. XIII (1903) (in Latin). Vol. VIII. Il Messaggero di S. Antonio.
- Pięta, Zenon (2002). Hierarchia catholica medii et recentioris aevi... A pontificatu Pii PP. X (1903) usque ad pontificatum Benedictii PP. XV (1922) (in Latin). Vol. IX. Padua: Messagero di San Antonio. ISBN 978-88-250-1000-8.

=== Studies ===
- Backman, Clifford R. (2002). The Decline and Fall of Medieval Sicily: Politics, Religion, and Economy in the Reign of Frederick III, 1296-1337. Cambridge University Press. ISBN 978-0-521-52181-9.
- Cappelletti, Giuseppe (1870). Le chiese d'Italia dalla loro origine sino ai nostri giorni (in Italian). Vol. vigesimoprimo (21). Venezia: Antonelli. pp. 572–579.
- Kamp, Norbert (1975). Kirche und Monarchie im staufischen Königreich Sizilien: I. Prosopographische Grundlegung, Bistumer und Bischofe des Konigreichs 1194–1266: 3. Sizilien München: Wilhelm Fink 1975.
- Marzo Ferro, Girolamo di (1860). Stato presente della Chiesa di Sicilia di Girolamo Di Marzo Ferro (in Italian). Palermo: Officio Tipografico Lo Bianco. pp. 66–72.
- Pirro, Rocco (1733). Mongitore, Antonino (ed.). Sicilia sacra disquisitionibus et nototoos illustrata. Vol. Tomus primus (third ed.). Palermo: haeredes P. coppulae. pp. 451–487.
