= Paolo Gillet =

Italian Roman Catholic prelate (1929–2025)

His Excellency Paolo Gillet
- Auxiliary Bishop Emeritus of Albano
- Metropolis: Rome
- Diocese: Albano
- Appointed: 7 December 1993
- Term ended: 22 February 2005
- Other post: Titular Bishop of Germa in Galatia (1993–2026)

Orders
- Ordination: 19 September 1953
- Consecration: 6 January 1994 by Pope John Paul II, Giovanni Battista Re and Josip Uhač

Personal details
- Born: 8 July 1929 Rome, Italy
- Died: 5 January 2026 (aged 96) Rome, Italy
- Motto: Et Verbum Caro Factum Est
- Coat of arms

Styles of Paolo Gillet
- Reference style: His Excellency; The Most Reverend
- Spoken style: Your Excellency
- Religious style: Bishop

Paolo Gillet (8 July 1929 – 5 January 2026) was an Italian Catholic prelate.

== Biography ==
Gillet was born on 8 July 1929 in Rome, and was educated at the Almo Collegio Capranica. He was ordained on 19 September 1953.

On 1 January 1990, he was chosen by Pope John Paul II as prelate secretary of the vicariate of Rome. He was also secretary general of the Roman diocesan synod, held between 1992 and 1993. On 7 December 1993, Pope John Paul II appointed him auxiliary bishop of Albano and titular bishop of Germa in Galatia. On 6 January 1994, he received episcopal ordination, in St. Peter's Basilica in the Vatican, by the laying on of hands of the pontiff, co-consecrating the archbishops Giovanni Battista Re and Josip Uhač.

On 22 February 2005, the same pontiff accepted his resignation, presented upon reaching the age limit, from the office of auxiliary bishop of Albano.

Gillet died on 5 January 2026, at the age of 96.

Catholic Church titles
Preceded by —	Auxiliary Bishop of Albano; 1993–2005	Succeeded by —
Preceded by Ricardo Blázquez	Titular Bishop of Germa in Galatia; 1993–2026	Succeeded by Vacant
