= Angelo Rizzo =

- Bishop of Ragusa
- Church: Catholic Church
- Diocese: Diocese of Ragusa
- In office: 2 February 1974 – 16 February 2002
- Predecessor: Francesco Pennisi
- Successor: Paolo Urso

Orders
- Ordination: 31 October 1948 by Giovanni Jacono
- Consecration: 18 March 1974 by Salvatore Pappalardo

Personal details
- Born: 11 April 1926 Montedoro, Province of Caltanissetta, Kingdom of Italy
- Died: 16 July 2009 (aged 83) Montedoro, Sicily, Italy

Angelo Rizzo (11 April 1926, Montedoro, Province of Caltanissetta – 16 July 2009, Montedoro) was the Bishop of the Roman Catholic Diocese of Ragusa, Sicily from 2 February 1974 until his retirement on 16 February 2002. He was succeeded as bishop by Paolo Urso.

Rizzo died on 16 July 2009, in his native Montedoro, aged 83.

== External links and references ==
- Catholic Hierarchy: Bishop Angelo Rizzo †
- Corriere di Ragusa: Angelo Rizzo obituary (Italian)
