= Teresa Maria Manetti =

Italian Roman Catholic religious sister

Blessed Teresa Maria Manetti SCST
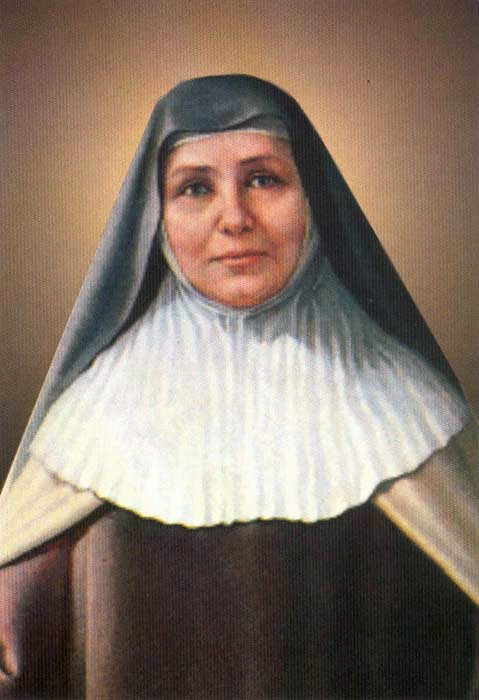

Virgin
- Born: 2 March 1846; Campi Bisenzio, Florence, Grand Duchy of Tuscany
- Died: 23 April 1910 (aged 64); Campi Bisenzio, Florence, Kingdom of Italy
- Venerated in: Roman Catholic Church
- Beatified: 19 October 1986, Florence, Italy by Pope John Paul II
- Feast: 23 April

Teresa Maria of the Cross, SCST (born Teresa Adelaide Cesina Manetti; 3 March 1846 – 23 April 1910) was an Italian Catholic religious sister and the founder of the Carmelite Sisters of Saint Teresa. She was previously a member of the Third Order of Our Lady of Mount Carmel.

Teresa Maria of the Cross was beatified by Pope John Paul II in 1986 after the recognition of a miracle attributed to her.

== Life ==
Teresa Maria Manetti was born on 3 March 1846 in Campi Bisenzio as the daughter of Salvatore Manetti and Rosa Bigagli. Her brother was Adamo Raffaello. Teresa Maria lived her life in a small village outside of Florence and her father died when she was three. She received her First Communion on 8 May 1859.

At the age of eighteen - at the time that she suddenly realized what her vocation was - Teresa Maria gathered a group of women who were all teachers; the group soon became exposed to the writings of the Teresa of Avila, and soon enough a devotion to her grew. On 16 July 1876 Teresa Maria joined a group of Carmelite tertiaries, which she joined on 12 July 1888.

Following this, Teresa Maria of the Cross started to establish schools in cities surrounding Florence, each with its own Carmelite teachers. The congregation she founded received approval from Pope Pius X on 27 February 1904 as the Carmelite Sisters of Saint Teresa. Their mission was to teach children, with an emphasis on orphans. Houses eventually opened in Syria and Palestine after the approval was granted.

Teresa Maria of the Cross contracted a grave illness in 1908 which intensified until she died on 23 April 1910. Her relics were relocated on 22 April 1912.

== Beatification ==
The cause for beatification commenced in Florence in the 1930s. Theologians approved Manetti's spiritual writings on 27 November 1937. Pope Pius XII formally opened the cause on 30 July 1944, granting Manetti the title of Servant of God. Pope Paul VI approved the findings of the Congregation for the Causes of Saints and approved the fact that she had lived a life of heroic virtue. As a result, on 23 May 1975, he declared her to be Venerable.

Pope John Paul II approved a miracle attributed to her intercession on 16 November 1985 and beatified her on 19 October 1986.
