= Ignazio Zuccaro =

Italian Roman Catholic priest and bishop

- Titular Bishop of Archelaïs
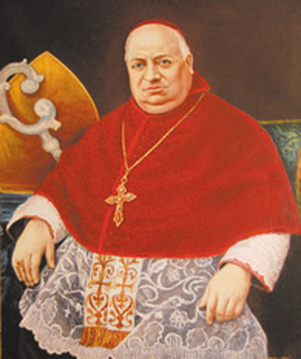
- Church: Catholic Church
- See: Archelaïs
- In office: 30 April 1906 – 28 November 1913
- Predecessor: Ercolano Marini
- Successor: Modesto Augusto Vieira
- Previous post: Bishop of Caltanissetta (1896-1906)

Orders
- Ordination: 14 June 1862
- Consecration: 19 July 1896 by Michelangelo Celesia

Personal details
- Born: 23 August 1839 Palermo, Province of Palermo, Kingdom of the Two Sicilies
- Died: 28 November 1913 (aged 74) Palermo, Province of Palermo, Kingdom of Italy

Ignazio Zuccaro (23 August 1839, Palermo – 28 November 1913, Palermo) was an Italian Roman Catholic priest and bishop. He was ordained a priest on 14 June 1862. Pope Leo XIII appointed him the third bishop of Caltanissetta on 22 June 1896 and he was consecrated on 19 July that year by cardinal Michelangelo Celesia - he remained in that role until 1906, when he was instead made titular archbishop of Archelais, a role he held until his death.
