= Antonino Maria Stromillo =

Italian Roman Catholic bishop

Antonino Maria Stromillo C.R.
- Bishop of Caltanissetta
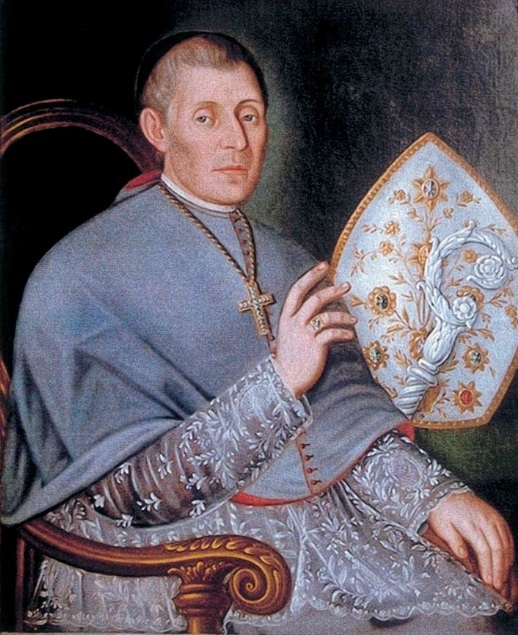
- Church: Catholic Church
- Diocese: Diocese of Caltanissetta
- In office: 20 January 1845 – 7 January 1858
- Predecessor: Diocese established
- Successor: Giovanni Battista Guttadauro di Reburdone

Orders
- Ordination: 26 March 1814
- Consecration: 16 February 1845 by Gabriele Ferretti

Personal details
- Born: 5 June 1789 Gorga Cliento, Principato Citra, Kingdom of Naples
- Died: 7 January 1858 (aged 68)

Antonino Maria Stromillo (5 June 1789, Gorga Cilento - 7 January 1858, Caltanissetta) was an Italian Roman Catholic bishop. From 1845 until his death he was the first bishop of the new Diocese of Caltanissetta.
