= Salvatore Cassisa =

Italian prelate

- Archbishop of Archdiocese of Monreale Emeritus
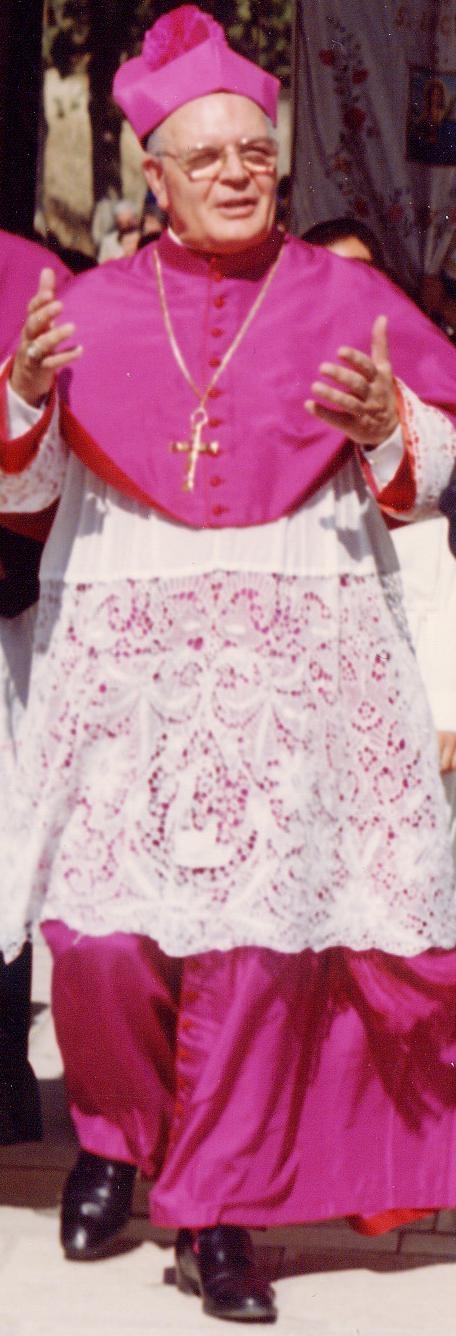
- Church: Roman Catholic Church
- See: Archdiocese of Monreale
- In office: 1978 - 1997
- Predecessor: Corrado Mingo
- Successor: Pio Vittorio Vigo

Orders
- Ordination: 3 September 1944

Personal details
- Born: 12 December 1921 Trapani, Italy
- Died: 3 August 2015 (aged 93) Palermo, Italy

Salvatore Cassisa (12 December 1921 – 3 August 2015) was an Italian prelate of the Roman Catholic Church.

Cassisa was born in Trapani, Italy and was ordained a priest on 3 September 1944. He was appointed bishop of the Diocese of Cefalù on 1 December 1973 and was ordained bishop on 24 January 1974. Cassisa was appointed archbishop of the Archdiocese of Monreale on 11 March 1978, where he would serve until his retirement on 24 May 1997. He died on 3 August 2015.
