= Giovanni Battista Guttadauro di Reburdone =

- Bishop of Caltanissetta
- Church: Catholic Church
- Diocese: Diocese of Caltanissetta
- In office: 23 December 1858 – 26 April 1896
- Predecessor: Antonino Maria Stromillo
- Successor: Ignazio Zuccaro

Orders
- Ordination: 22 September 1838
- Consecration: 9 January 1859 by Gerolamo Marquese d'Andrea

Personal details
- Born: 13 September 1814 Catania, Kingdom of Sicily
- Died: 26 April 1896 (aged 81)

Giovanni Battista Guttadauro di Reburdone (13 September 1814, Catania - 26 April 1896) was a Roman Catholic priest and bishop.

== Life ==
He was ordained as a priest on 22 September 1838. His appointment as Bishop of Caltanissetta was on 23 December 1858, and his consecration as bishop was on 9 January 1859 as Santi XII Apostoli in Rome. He was a Council Father at the First Vatican Council.
