= Ettore Baranzini =

Italian prelate (1881–1968)

- Archbishop of Siracusa
- Church: Catholic Church
- Archdiocese: Archdiocese of Siracusa
- In office: 29 April 1933 – 6 March 1968
- Predecessor: Giacomo Carabelli
- Successor: Giuseppe Bonfiglioli

Orders
- Ordination: 27 March 1904
- Consecration: 5 June 1933 by Francesco Marchetti Selvaggiani

Personal details
- Born: 22 September 1881 Angera, Province of Como, Kingdom of Italy
- Died: 6 March 1968 (aged 86) Syracuse, Sicily, Italy

Ettore Baranzini (22 September 1881 – 6 March 1968) was an Italian prelate of the Catholic Church who was secretary to Cardinal Alessandro Lualdi for fifteen years, Rector of the Pontifical Lombard Seminary from 1920 to 1933, and Archbishop of Siracusa for thirty-five years.

== Biography ==
Ettore Baranzini was born on 22 September 1881 in Angera, Italy. His studied at the Pontifical Lombard Seminary from 1899 to 1902. He earned degrees in philosophy from the Pontifical Academy of Saint Thomas Aquinas and in theology and canon law at the Pontifical Gregorian University. He was ordained a priest of the Archdiocese of Milan on 27 March 1904 and in December began a fifteen-year stint secretary to Alessandro Lualdi, the new Archbishop of Palermo. On 28 July 1920, he was named Rector of the Pontifical Lombard Seminary, his alma mater, which Pope Benedict XV had just restored as an independent institution. He attended the 1922 conclave that elected Pope Pius XI as an assistant to Lualdi.

On 29 April 1933, Pope Pius XI named him Archbishop of Siracusa.

He received his episcopal consecration on 5 June 1933 from Cardinal Francesco Marchetti Selvaggiani; he was installed in Siracusa on 10 September.

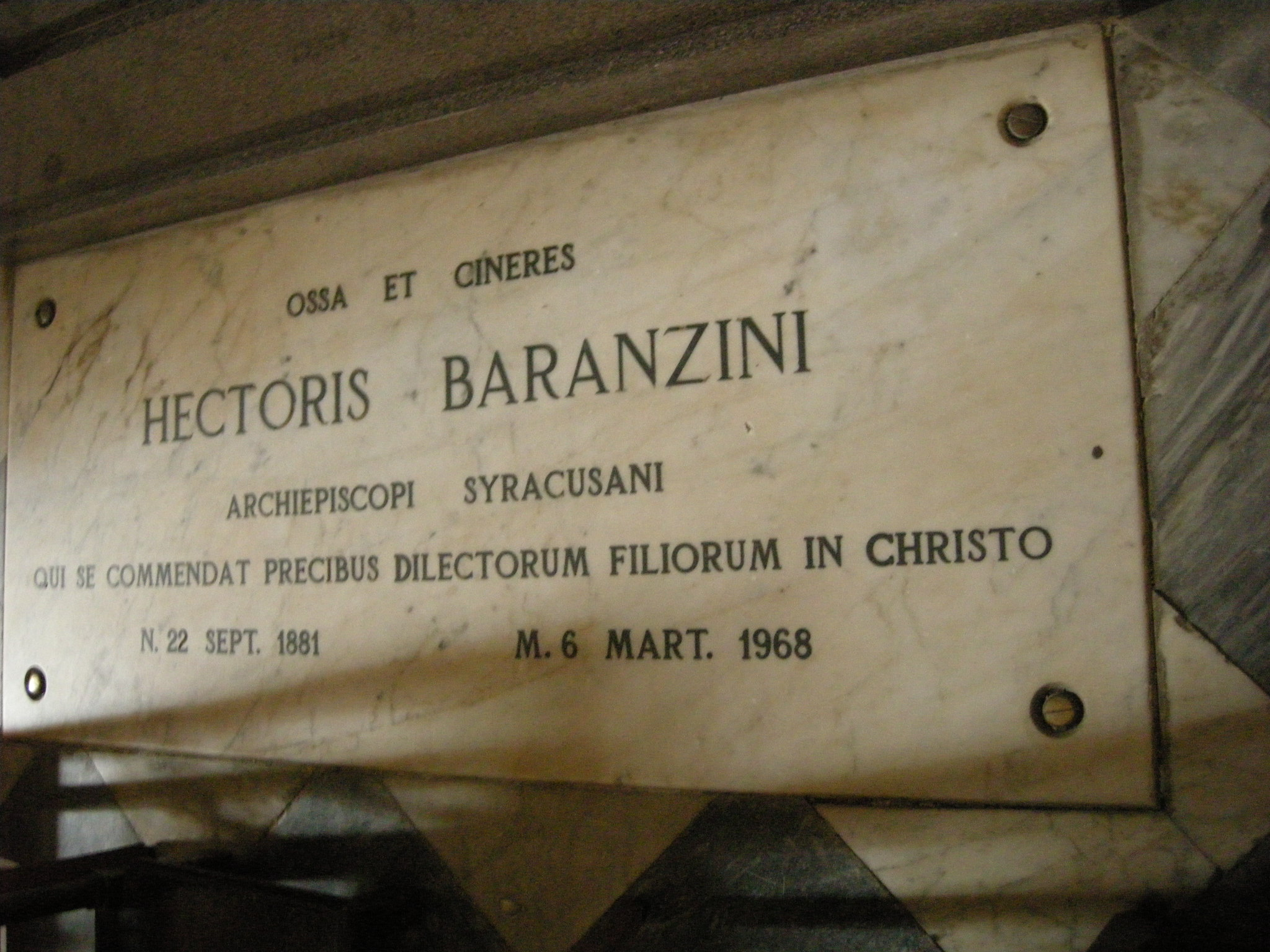
Baranzini's tomb in the Siracusa Cathedral

When the Diocese of Ragusa was created as a suffragan diocese of Siracusa on 6 May 1950 from territory of the Archdiocese of Siracusa, Baranzini was named Bishop of Ragusa while continuing as Archbishop of Siracusa. Baranzini's role in Ragusa ended on 1 October 1955 when that diocese was detached from Siracusa and Francesco Pennisi, its auxiliary bishop since 1950, became its ordinary.

Baranzini died on 6 March 1968 at the age of 86.
