= Ragusa Cathedral =

Roman Catholic cathedral in Ragusa, Sicily

Coordinates: 36.9257°N 14.7287°E

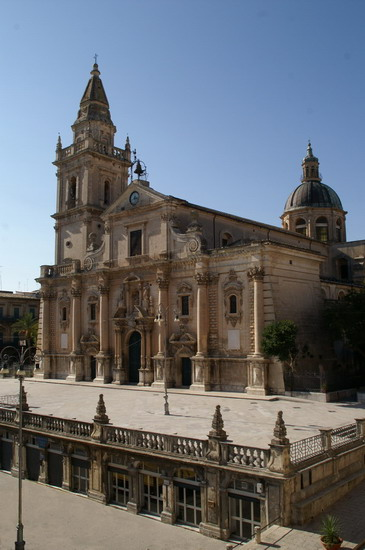
Ragusa Cathedral

Ragusa Cathedral (Italian: Duomo di Ragusa, Cattedrale di San Giovanni Battista) is a Roman Catholic cathedral in Ragusa, Sicily, dedicated to Saint John the Baptist. The present church dates from the early 18th century. It has been the seat of the Bishops of Ragusa since the establishment of the diocese in 1950.

== History ==
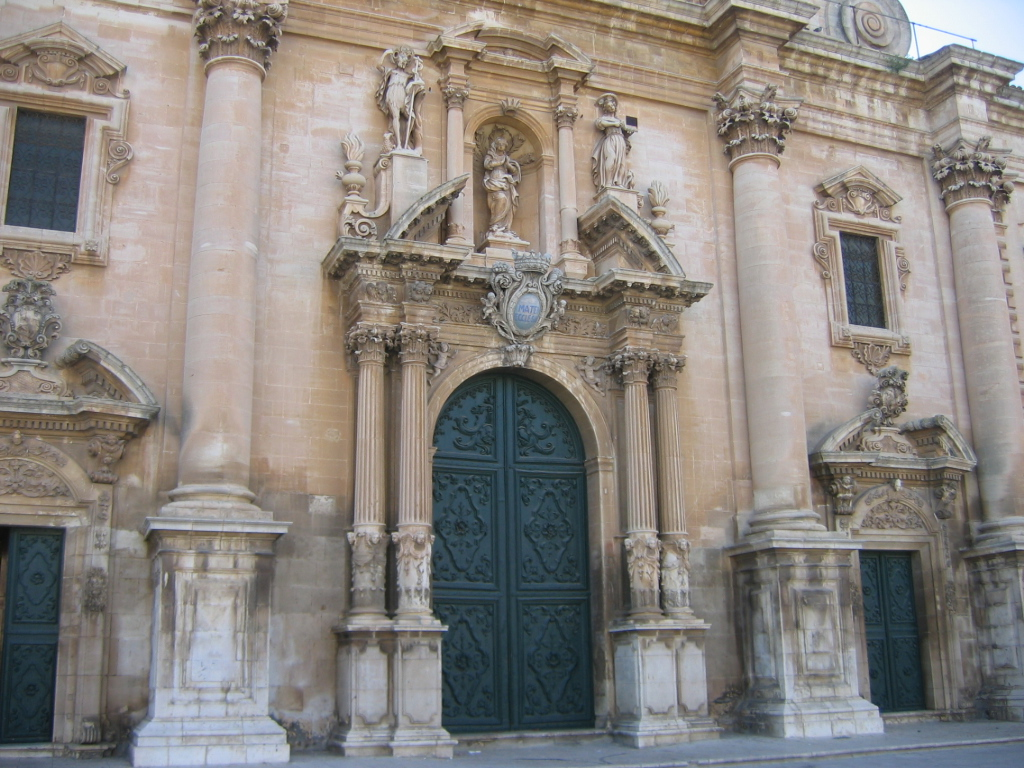
Cathedral west front

A church of San Giovanni Battista stood before the 1693 Sicily earthquake in the west of the old town of Ragusa (Ragusa Ibla) under the walls of a medieval castle, where there now stands the church of St. Agnes.

Severely damaged by the earthquake, it was rebuilt at the center of the new upper town of Ragusa in the district of "Patro". On 15 April 1694 the foundation stone was laid. The church was finished after just four months, so that on 16 August the same year it was opened for worship in a solemn ceremony which was attended by all the elders of the county. The short time it took for the building indicates that it was a small church, inadequate to the needs of the new district.

In 1718, therefore, the construction on the site of a larger church began. Two master builders of Acireale, Giuseppe Recupero and Giovanni Arcidiacono, oversaw the project, and some architectural details of the church of San Giovanni are typical of the Baroque monuments of Acireale and Catania, such as the monumental Baroque main entrance with rusticated columns, which has significant similarities with the marble door of Acireale Cathedral.

The interior dates from the 19th and 20th centuries. In 1950 the church became the cathedral of the newly created Diocese of Ragusa.
