= Diocese of Ragusa, Sicily =

Roman Catholic diocese in Italy

Coordinates: 36.9333°N 14.7333°E

Diocese of Ragusa Dioecesis Ragusiensis

Catholic
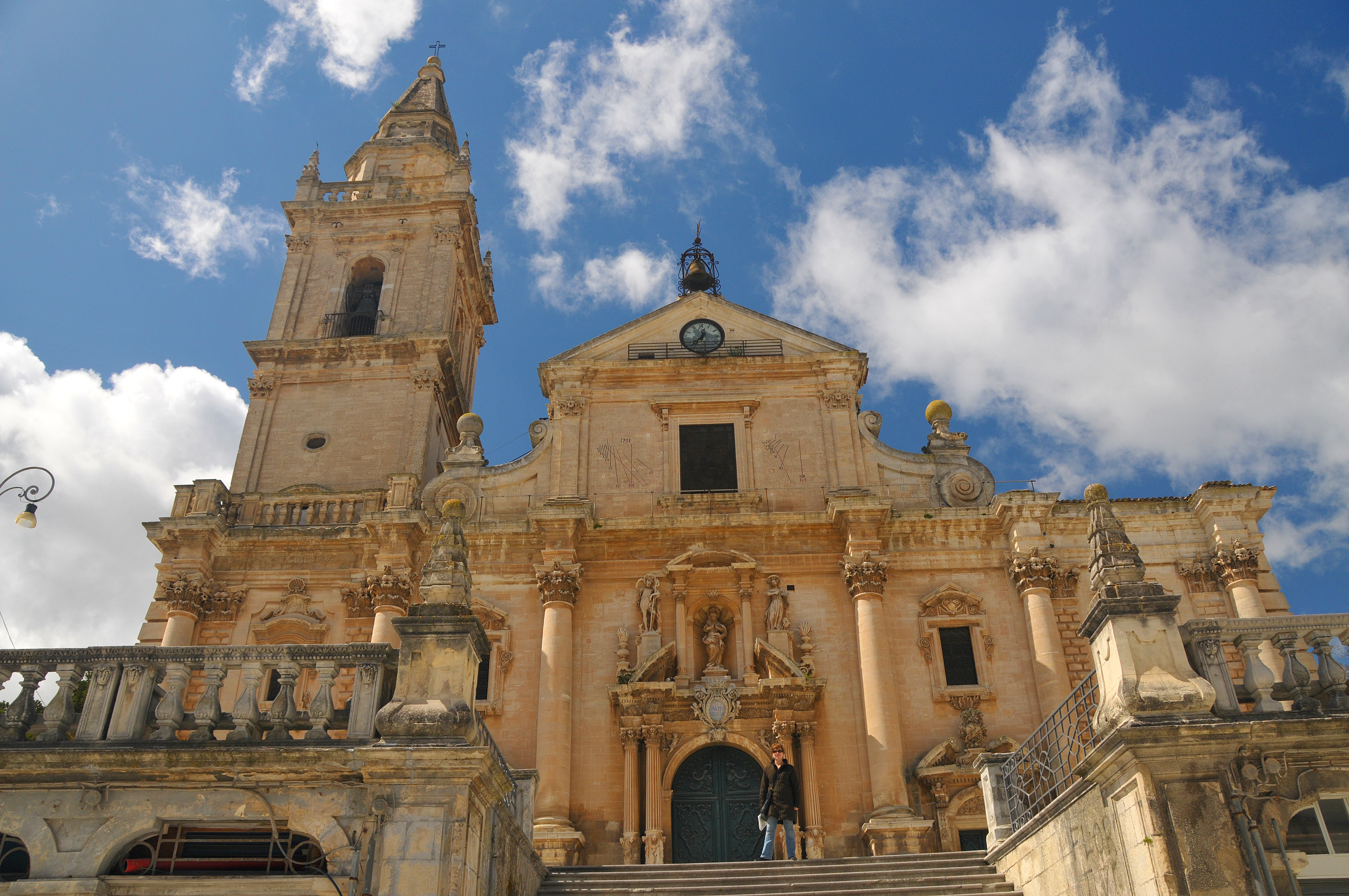
- Ragusa Cathedral

Location
- Country: Italy
- Ecclesiastical province: Siracusa

Statistics
- Area: 1,029 km^{2} (397 sq mi)
- Population: Total; Catholics: (as of 2022); 223,852; 216,874 (96.5%)
- Parishes: 71

Information
- Denomination: Catholic Church
- Rite: Roman Rite
- Established: 6 May 1950 (76 years ago)
- Cathedral: Saint John the Baptist Cathedral
- Secular priests: 92 (diocesan) ▼20 (Religious Orders) ▼6 Permanent Deacons ▼

Current leadership
- Pope: Leo XIV
- Archbishop: Giuseppe La Placa
- Bishops emeritus: Paolo Urso; Carmelo Cutitta

Map
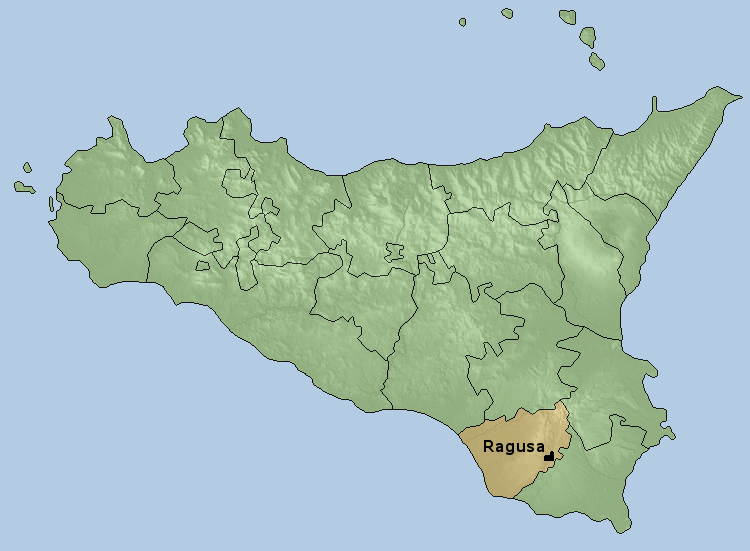

Website
- www.diocesidiragusa.it

The Diocese of Ragusa (Latin: Dioecesis Ragusiensis) is a Latin diocese of the Catholic Church in south-eastern Sicily. It was erected in 1950. It is a suffragan of the Archdiocese of Siracusa.

== History ==
When created on 6 May 1950, by Pope Pius XII, from territory drawn from the Archdiocese of Siracusa, the parish church of San Giovanni Battista in Ragusa was erected into a cathedral, and provided with a Chapter of canons.

On 11 July 1950, a decree of the Sacred Consistorial Congregation removed the territory of the commune of Giarratana, 26 km north of Ragusa, along with its parishes, from the diocese of Noto and attached them to the diocese of Ragusa.

The diocese of Ragusa remained tied to that archdiocese of Siracusa aeque personaliter, in the person of Archbishop Ettore Baranzini, who held the title Bishop of Ragusa as well. The Diocese of Ragusa became fully independent on 1 October 1955, with the appointment of a bishop of its own, Francesco Pennisi.

== Bishops of Ragusa ==
- Ettore Baranzini (6 May 1950 – 1 October 1955)
- Francesco Pennisi (1 October 1955 – 2 February 1974), retired
- Angelo Rizzo (2 February 1974 – 16 February 2002), retired
- Paolo Urso (16 February 2002 – 1 October 2015)
- Carmelo Cuttitta (Note: Cuttitta was born in Godrano in 1962. He is a Bachelor of theology. From 1990 to 1996 he was the Private Secretary of the Archbishop of Palermo, Cardinal Salvatore Pappalardo, and from 2002 to 2007 a member of the College of Consultors of the diocese of Palermo. On 28 May 2007 he was named Auxiliary Bishop of Palermo.) (1 October 2015 – 28 December 2020)
- Giuseppe La Placa (8 May 2021 – present)

== See also ==
- Roman Catholic Archdiocese of Siracusa
- Roman Catholic Diocese of Noto
