= Germa (Galatia) =

Archaeological site in Turkey

Coordinates: 39°31′54″N 31°37′37″E

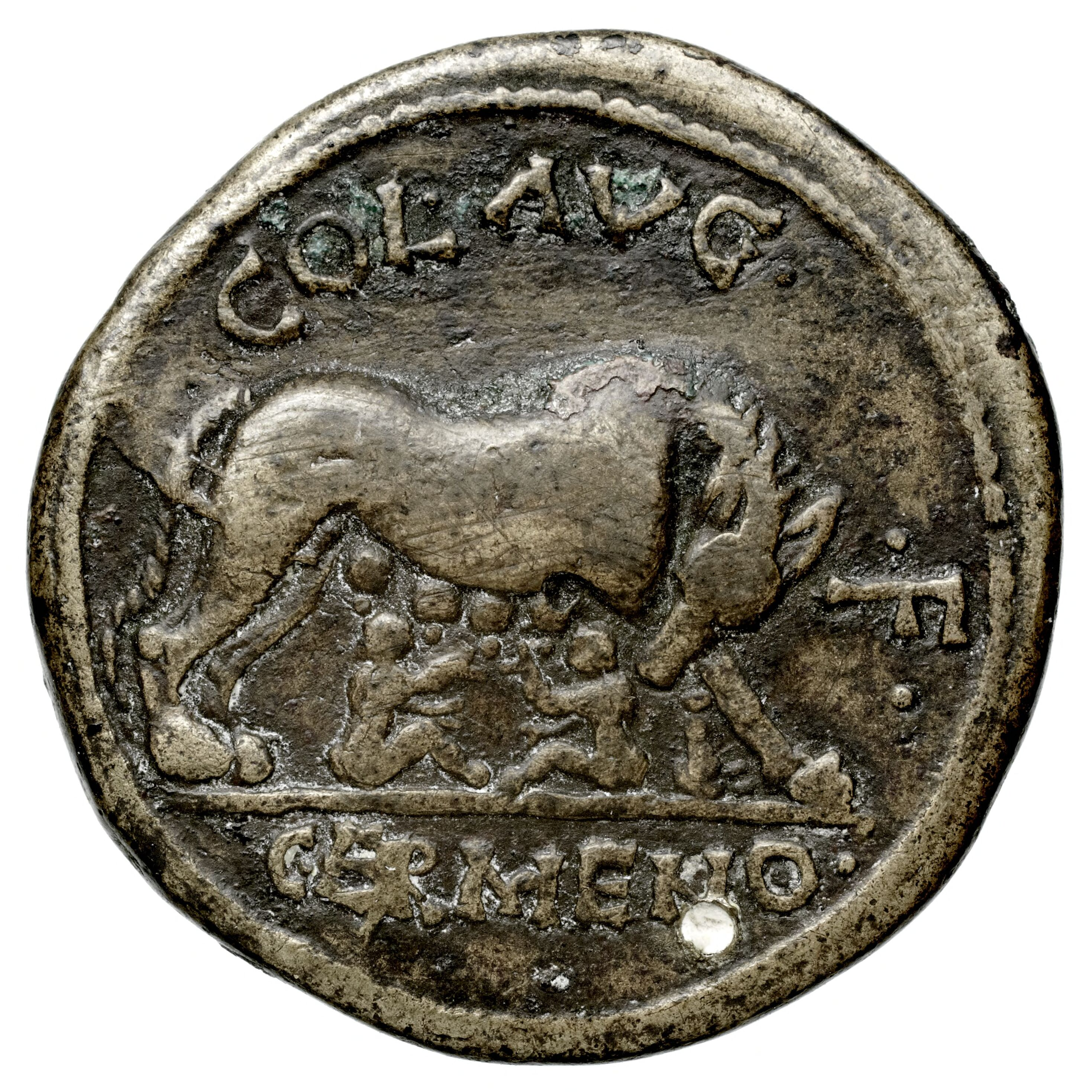
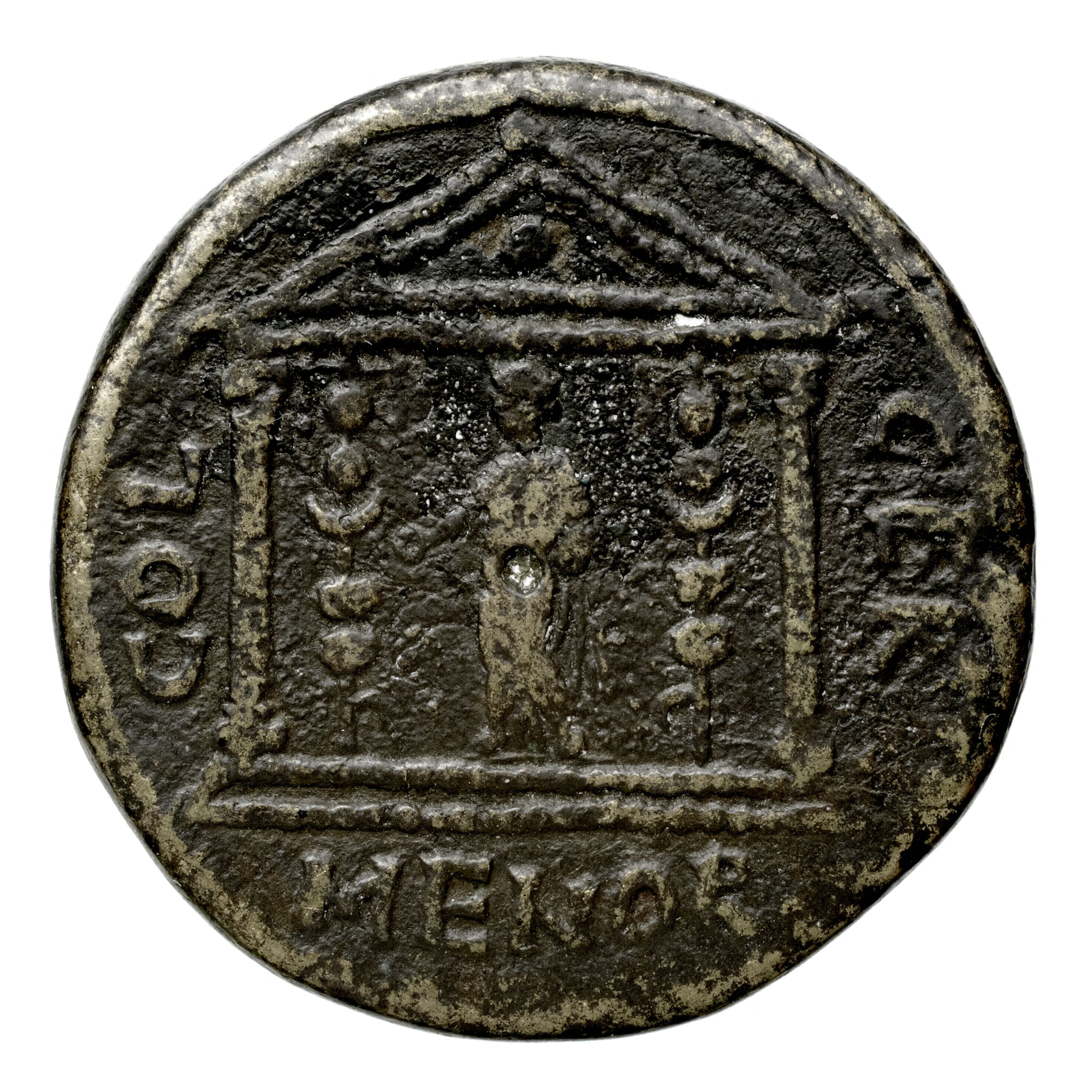
Reverse sides of two bronze coins issued for Germa by the emperor Commodus (177-192 CE): left, the she-wolf suckles Romulus and Remus, framed by the legend COL AVG F GERMENO (Col[onia] Aug[usta] F[elix] Germeno[rum]); right, Commodus performs a sacrificial gesture with a patera between a pair of military standards in a temple, with the legend COL GERMENOR (Col[onia] Germenor[um])

Germa (Greek Γέρμα) or Germokoloneia (Γερμοκολώνεια, from Latin Colonia Iulia Augusta Felix Germenorum) was an ancient and Byzantine city in the Roman province of Galatia Secunda. The Byzantine writer Theophanes informs us that at a later period Germa took the name of Myriangeli. The few archaeological remains lie close to present-day Babadat in Eskişehir Province, Turkey.

When between 25 and 20 BCE Augustus made Galatia a Roman province, he founded Germa as a Roman colony. The city was situated at the point where the road from Ancyra forked, one branch going to Dorylaeum, the other to Pessinus. From the time of Domitian it had a mint.

== Titular see ==
Its Christian bishopric was a residential see until the 12th century and is now, as "Germa in Galatia", a titular see of the Catholic Church.
