= Diocese of Caltanissetta =

Latin Catholic diocese in Italy

Coordinates: 37.4833°N 14.0667°E

Diocese of Caltanissetta Dioecesis Calatanisiadensis

Catholic
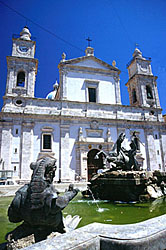
- Cathedral in Caltanissetta

Location
- Country: Italy
- Ecclesiastical province: Agrigento

Statistics
- Area: 1,120 km^{2} (430 sq mi)
- Population: Total; Catholics: (as of 2023); 162,100 ▼; 160,700 (est.) ▼
- Parishes: 69 ▲

Information
- Denomination: Catholic Church
- Sui iuris church: Latin Church
- Rite: Roman Rite
- Established: 25 May 1844 (182 years ago)
- Cathedral: Cattedrale di S. Maria La Nova
- Secular priests: 98 (diocesan) ▼14 (Religious Orders) ▲15 Permanent Deacons ▲

Current leadership
- Pope: Leo XIV
- Bishop: Mario Russotto

Map
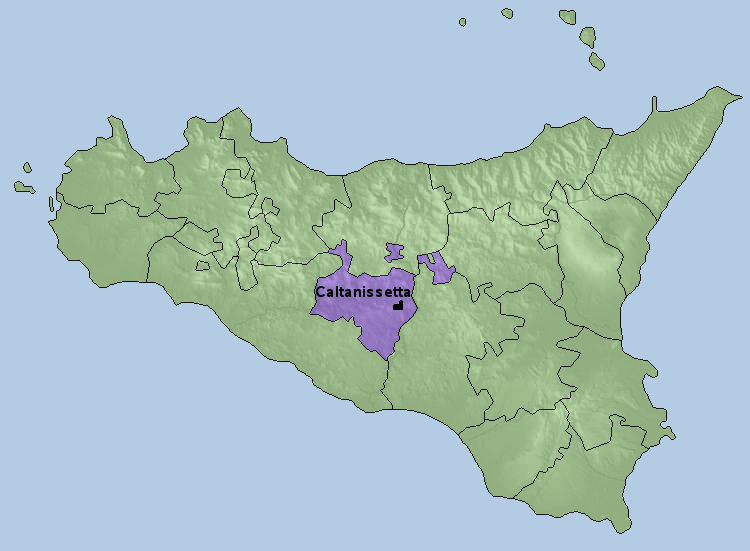

Website
- www.diocesicaltanissetta.it

The Diocese of Caltanissetta (Latin: Dioecesis Calatanisiadensis) is a Latin Church diocese of the Catholic Church in Sicily. The city is located 40 mi (53 km) northeast of Agrigento, and some 32 mi (50 km) northwest of Piazza Armerina. From 1844 to 2000, the diocese belonged to the ecclesiastical province of Monreale. The diocese has been a suffragan of the archdiocese of Agrigento since 2000.

== History ==
In 1622, the principal parish church in Caltanissetta, Santa Maria la Nova, was founded. In 1745, it was elevated to the status of a collegiate church, headed by the dignities of Dean, Cantor, and Treasurer, with eleven other canons.

=== Efforts at beginning of the 19th century ===
There were only nine bishops in the entire island of Sicily in 1805, all of whom were overburdened by growing population and difficulties of travel. Appeals, petitions, and Sicilian legislation had done no good. The French invasion of the Italian peninsula in 1798, and the capture and imprisonment of Pope Pius VI at Valence (1798–1799) halted all plans. The new pope Pius VII (1801–1823) was continually obstructed, and finally deposed and exiled, along with the cardinals of his curia, to France and Navona (1809–1814). The king of Naples and Sicily was expelled in 1806, in favor of a French kingship headed by Joseph Bonaparte and then by Joachim Murat. Only in 1815 did regular government begin to be reestablished.

Before the signing of the concordat, on 16 February 1818 at Terracina, or the reestablishment of the king in Naples, Pius VII ordered the erection of three new dioceses in Sicily: Caltagirone (12 September 1816), Nicosia (17 March 1817), and Piazza Armerina (3 July 1817).

In 1819, Caltanissetta was made the capital of its province, and in 1820 the deputy from Caltanissetta to the parliament in Naples, Doctor Giuseppe Cinnarella, began a campaign to have a bishopric there.

=== Establishment of the diocese ===
The town and territory of Caltanissetta formerly belonged to the diocese of Girgenti (Agrigento), but was created an episcopal see by Gregory XVI, on 8 June 1844, with the bull "Ecclesiae Universalis." To form the territory of the new diocese, fourteen towns (oppida) were taken from the diocese of Agrigento, two from the diocese of Nicosia, and two from the diocese of Cefalù.

The collegiate church of Santa Maria Nuova was deprived of its collegial status and its Chapter of canons was suppressed, leaving it as the principal parish church of the city of Caltanissetta. That church was then raised to the dignity of a cathedral, and a new cathedral Chapter was established, headed by dignities (the Archpriest or Curionatus, the Dean, the Cantor, the Treasurer), and fourteen prebendary canons. The Archpriest was to be the Rector of the cathedral parish, and was to be appointed by the pope. One of the prebendary canonates was to be designated as the Theologus, and another the Penitentiary, and were to be appointed by the pope. The Chapter was to draw up its own statutes, so long as they conformed to Canon Law and papal decrees, and the bishop was to have the right of approval.

To provide income (mensa) for the bishop, with the king's permission the royal monastery of the Holy Spirit was suppressed, and its endowments, income and property was transferred to the bishops of Caltanissetta.

A seminary for the instruction of priests was to be established as soon as possible, in accordance with the decrees of the Council of Trent, and according to the promise made by the king.

From 1844, the diocese of Caltanissetta was a suffragan of the archdiocese of Monreale, and remained so until 2000. The first bishop was Antonio Stromillo.

=== Revolution ===
On 25 June 1847, King Ferdinand II visited Caltanissetta. On 28 January 1848, a band of "Liberators" from Palermo entered Caltanissetta, to be greeted with enthusiasm by the great majority of the people. A Municipal Committee of Defense was organized, which included Bishop Antonio Stromillo; it raised a force of 200 men to ensure public order in the valley. When the regional committee of the valley was formed, Bishop Stromillo became President of the civil section, which administered public labor and public charity (beneficenza).

In mid-July 1848, the corporate bodies of the Jesuits and the Redemptorists were dissolved, and on 1 August they were expelled from Caltanissetta. The Jesuit house was occupied by a contingent of the Mobile National Guard

On 23 April 1849, it was announced that royal troops, under the command of General Carlo Filangieri, who had landed at Messina on 3 September 1848, were advancing. From 24 April to 3 May 1849, Caltanissetta was occupied by royal troops, under the command of General Calogero Barile, who governed the province for the next three years as Syndic. By May 1849, Filangieri had conquered the entire island of Sicily, and was named Governor (Luogotenente generale dei reali domini al di là del Faro). The Jesuits and Redemptorists returned. Ferdinand II died on 22 May 1859, and was succeeded by Francis II of the Two Sicilies, whose control over Sicily ended in 1860 with Garibaldi's Expedition of the Thousand. The Bourbons no longer enjoyed the right of presentation of Sicilian bishops, and the House of Savoy, which had annexed the Papal States, was not recognized by the Papacy. By a decree of 17 June 1860, Garibaldi again expelled the Jesuits and Redemptorists, as favorers of despotism. In August 1862, Garibaldi and 500 of his volunteers passed through Caltanissetta. Bishop Guttadauro prudently retired to the town of Barrafranca, some 30 km to the southeast.

=== Building the diocese ===
In the 19th century, Caltanissetta and the rest of Sicily saw the phenomenon of mass emigration due to the hopelessness of poverty and absence of opportunity.

In 1859, Bishop Giovanni Battista Guttadauro di Reburdone (1858–1896) established a provisional seminary in a house. He complained in his "ad limina" report of 1869 that the assistance promised by the kings, in accordance with the bull of 1844, had not been forthcoming, despite repeated attempts by Bishop Stromillo to persuade King Ferdinand II of the Two Sicilies to honor his commitments.

On 21 October 1882, Bishop Giovanni Battista Gottadauro, with the assistance of Bishop Giovanni Blandini of Noto and Bishop Gaetano Blandini titular bishop of Sergiopolis, performed the episcopal consecration of Giuseppe Francica-Nava de Bontifè as bishop of Alabanda (Caria, Turkey) and auxiliary bishop of Caltanissetta. Francica-Nava became archbishop of Catania in 1895, and a cardinal in 1899.

In 1893, Bishop Guttadauro was one of the first bishops to laud and publicize the encyclical "Rerum Novarum" of Pope Leo XIII.

In May 1899, in anticipation of the celebration of the 19th centeniary of the birth of Christ, the Comitato Romano of Caltanissetta produced a plan to erect a statue of the Redeemer on a hilltop, Monte San Giuliano, just north of the city. A festival to celebrate its inauguration took place from 26 to 29 September 1900, presided over by Cardinal Giuseppe Francica-Nava of Catania, with the participation of the archbishop of Monreale and the bishops of Caltanissetta, Noto, Piazza Armerina, Mazara, Agrigento, and Lipari.

An administrative reorganization of the dioceses of Sicily occurred on 2 December 2000, when the diocese of Caltanissetta was removed from the province of Monreale to become suffragan to the newly elevated Archdiocese of Agrigento.

== Bishops ==
- Antonino Maria Stromillo, C.R. (1845 – 1858)
- Giovanni Battista Guttadauro di Reburdone (1858 – 1896)
- Ignazio Zuccaro (1896 – 1906))
- Antonio Augusto Intreccialagli, O.C.D.. (1907 – 1914)
- Giovanni Jacono (18 Mar 1921 – 21 Aug 1956 Retired)
- Francesco Monaco (2 Oct 1956 – 21 Dec 1973 Retired)
- Alfredo Maria Garsia (21 Dec 1973 – 2 Aug 2003 Retired)
- Mario Russotto (2003–present)

== Bibliography ==
- Bertolo, Giovanni Mulè (1906). Caltanissetta nei tempi che furono e nei tempi che sono. (in Italian). Caltanissetta: Forni, 1906.
- Cappelletti, Giuseppe (1870). Le chiese d'Italia dalla loro origine sino ai nostri giorni (in Italian). Vol. 21 (vigesimoprimo). Venezia: Antonelli. pp. 609–610.
- *D'Avino, Vincenzio (1848). Cenni storici sulle chiese arcivescovili, vescovili, e prelatizie (nullius) del regno delle due Sicilie (in Italian). Naples: dalle stampe di Ranucci. pp. 131–132.
- Miceli, Carolina (ed.) (2008). Francescanesimo e cultura nelle province di Caltanissetta ed Enna: atti del Convegno di studio, Caltanissetta-Enna, 27-29 ottobre 2005. (in Italian). Palermo: Biblioteca francescana di Palermo: Officina di Studi Medievali, 2008.
- Naro, Cataldo (1977). Il movimento cattolico a Caltanissetta (1893–1919). Caltanissetta: Edizoni del Seminario 1977.
- Naro, Cataldo (1991). La Chiesa di Caltanissetta tra le due guerre. (in Italian) 2 vols. Caltanissetta 1991.
- Panebianco, Raffaele (2021). La diocesi di Caltagirone nella riforma del Concilio Vaticano II. (in Italian). Romagnano al Monte: BookSprint 2021.
- Ritzler, Remigius; Sefrin, Pirminus (1968). Hierarchia Catholica medii et recentioris aevi (in Latin). Vol. VII (1800–1846). Monasterii: Libr. Regensburgiana.
- Remigius Ritzler; Pirminus Sefrin (1978). Hierarchia catholica Medii et recentioris aevi (in Latin). Vol. VIII (1846–1903. Il Messaggero di S. Antonio.
- Pięta, Zenon (2002). Hierarchia catholica medii et recentioris aevi (in Latin). Vol. IX (1903–1922). Padua: Messagero di San Antonio. ISBN 978-88-250-1000-8.
- Scarlata, Calogero (1997). S. Maria la Nova: la cattedrale di Caltanissetta. (in Italian). Caltanissetta: Edizioni Lussografica, 1997.

=== External links ===
- (in Italian) Official page
