= Salvatore Pappalardo (cardinal) =

Italian Cardinal and archbishop

His Eminence Salvatore Pappalardo
- Archbishop Emeritus of Palermo
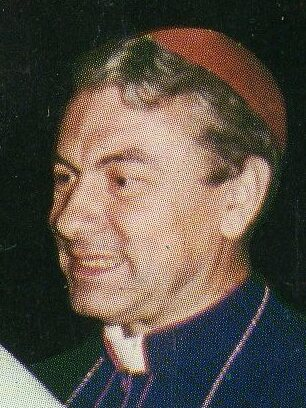
- Church: Roman Catholic Church
- Archdiocese: Palermo
- See: Palermo
- Appointed: 17 October 1970
- Term ended: 4 April 1996
- Predecessor: Francesco Carpino
- Successor: Salvatore De Giorgi
- Other posts: Cardinal-Priest of Santa Maria Odigitria dei Siciliani (pro hac vice, 1973–2006)
- Previous posts: Apostolic Pro-Nuncio to Indonesia (1965–69); Titular Archbishop of Miletus (1965–70); President of the Pontifical Ecclesiastical Academy (1969–70)

Orders
- Ordination: 12 April 1941 by Luigi Traglia
- Consecration: 16 January 1966 by Amleto Giovanni Cicognani
- Created cardinal: 5 March 1973 by Pope Paul VI
- Rank: Cardinal-Priest

Personal details
- Born: Salvatore Pappalardo; 23 September 1918 Villafranca Sicula, Agrigento, Kingdom of Italy
- Died: 10 December 2006 (aged 88) Palermo, Palermo, Italy
- Buried: Santa Cristina Cathedral, Palermo
- Parents: Alfio Pappalardo; Gaetana Coco
- Education: Pontifical Major Roman Seminary; Pontifical Gregorian University; Pontifical Ecclesiastical Academy; Pontifical Lateran University
- Motto: Semper inhaerere mandatis
- Coat of arms

Salvatore Pappalardo (23 September 1918 – 10 December 2006) was an Italian Cardinal of the Roman Catholic Church who was Archbishop of Palermo for over 25 years, from 1970 to 1996. He was the first senior clergyman from Sicily to speak out against the Mafia, breaking its code of omertà (imposed silence).

== Biography ==
Pappalardo was born in Villafranca Sicula in Sicily. He was ordained as a priest in Rome on 12 April 1941, and was a Counsellor of the Vatican Secretariat of State from 1947 to 1965, receiving in 1951 the title of Privy Chamberlain to Pope John XXIII, and in 1961 that of Domestic Prelate. He was appointed titular archbishop of Miletus and Apostolic Pro-Nuncio to Indonesia on 7 December 1965. He was appointed President of the Pontifical Ecclesiastical Academy in Rome on 7 May 1969. He was named Archbishop of Palermo on 17 October 1970. He was made Cardinal-Priest of Santa Maria Odigitria dei Siciliani by Pope Paul VI on 5 March 1973.

Styles of Salvatore Pappalardo
- Reference style: His Eminence
- Spoken style: Your Eminence
- Informal style: Cardinal
- See: Palermo

He was considered papabile in the October 1978 conclave that followed the death of Pope John Paul I. He would have been the first Sicilian pope in twelve centuries.

Pappalardo spoke out against the Mafia from the 1980s. At the funeral of Carlo Alberto Dalla Chiesa in 1982, who had been murdered along with his wife in Palermo, he criticised the Italian political establishment for failing to guarantee security in Sicily. He became more explicit in the early 1990s, after other anti-Mafia lawyers, policemen and priests had been murdered. At the funeral of Giovanni Falcone in 1992, who was also murdered along with his wife near Palermo, he described the murderers as part of a "synagogue of Satan", leading to criticism from Italian Jews. He later apologised, having meant the word synagogue in its "old sense, as a gathering place". In 1993, at the funeral of murdered priest Pino Puglisi, he called for the people of Sicily to rise up against the Mafia. He was awarded the title of Knight of the Grand Cross of the Italian Republic by Italian president Sandro Pertini.

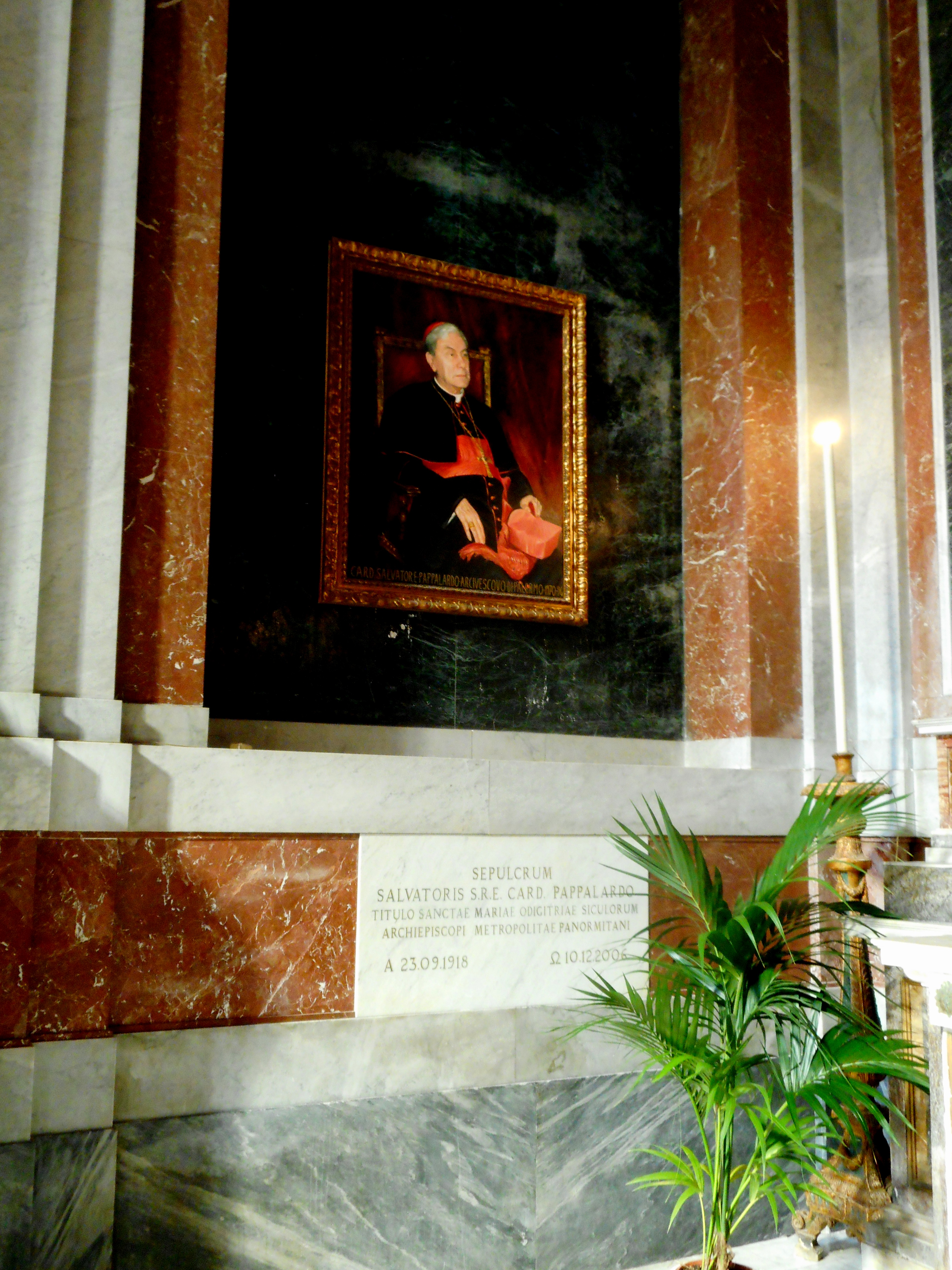
Pappalardo's grave

He retired upon the appointment of Salvatore De Giorgi as his successor on 4 April 1996. He died in Palermo on 10 December 2006 and was buried in the chapel of Santa Cristina in the Cathedral of Palermo on 12 December.

Educational offices
Preceded by Gino Paro	President of the Pontifical Ecclesiastical Academy; 7 May 1969 – 17 October 1970	Succeeded by Felice Pirozzi
Catholic Church titles
Preceded by Francesco Carpino	Archbishop of Palermo; 17 October 1970 – 4 April 1996	Succeeded by Salvatore De Giorgi
