= Riggio =

Riggio is a southern Italian surname derived from the city of Reggio Calabria. Notable people with the surname include:

- Andrea Riggio (1660–1717), Italian Catholic prelate
- Atsedeweine Tekle Riggio, Ethiopian lawyer and jurist
- Cristian Riggio (born 1996), Italian footballer
- Eliana Riggio, Italian UN official
- Girolamo Riggio (died 1589), Catholic priest
- Leonard Riggio (1941–2024), American businessman
- Matt Riggio (born 1988), Australian footballer
- Renato Riggio (born 1978), Argentine footballer
- Roc Riggio (born 2002), American baseball player

== See also ==
- Palazzo Riggio, Aci Catena, a palace in Italy
