= Aci Catena =

Aci Catena Jaci Catina (Sicilian)
- Comune
- Comune di Aci Catena
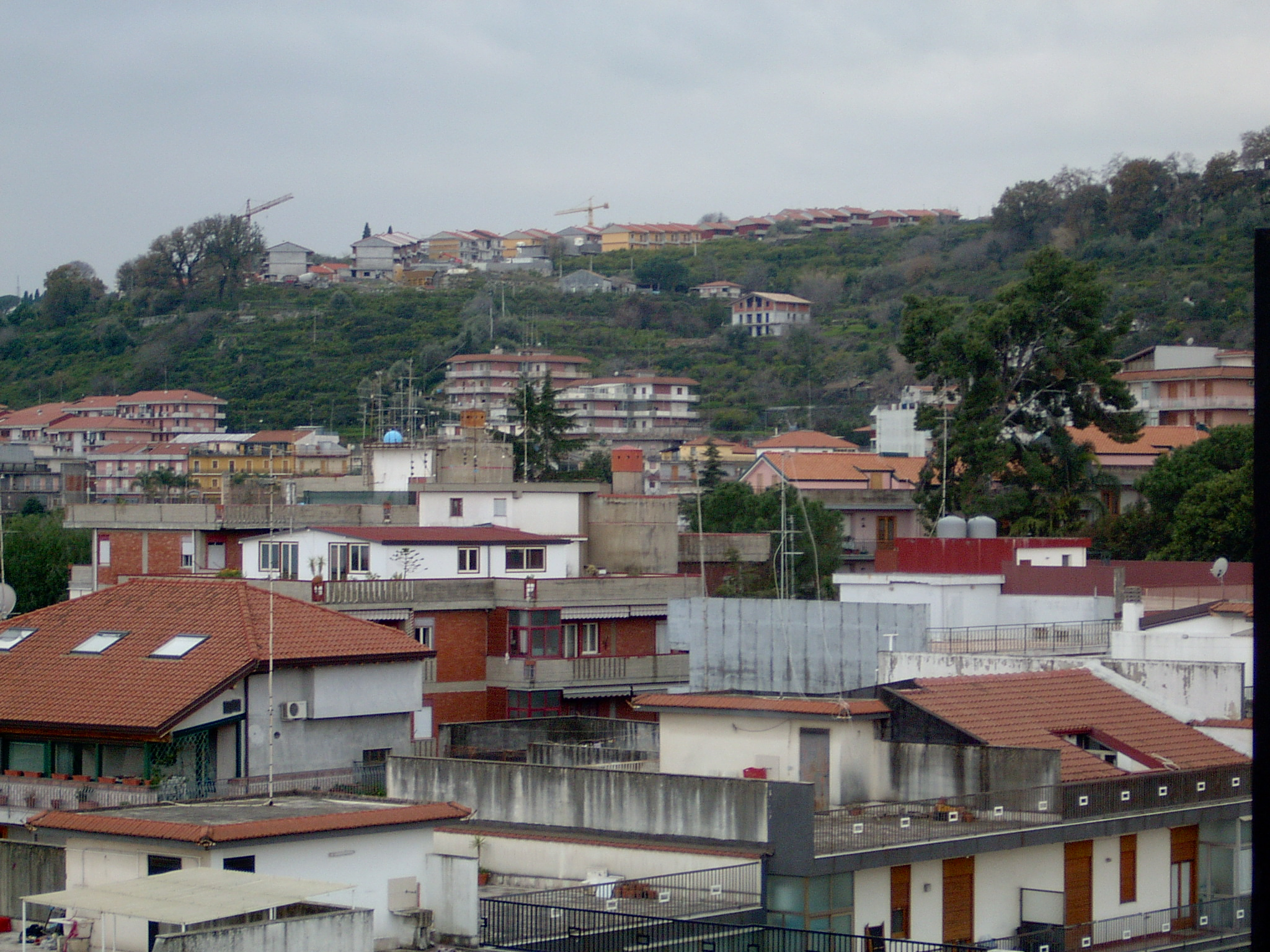

- Location of Aci Catena in Italy Aci Catena (Sicily)
- Coordinates: 37°36′N 15°08′E
- Country: Italy
- Region: Sicily
- Metropolitan city: Catania (CT)
- Frazioni: Aci San Filippo, Aci Santa Lucia, Eremo Sant'Anna, Nizzeti, Reitana, San Nicolò

Government
  - Mayor: Nello Oliveri

Area
  - Total: 8.53 km^{2} (3.29 sq mi)
- Elevation: 170 m (560 ft)

Population (30 April 2017)
  - Total: 29,662
  - Density: 3,480/km^{2} (9,010/sq mi)
- Demonym: Catenoti
- Time zone: UTC+1 (CET)
  - Summer (DST): UTC+2 (CEST)
- Postal code: 95022
- Dialing code: 095
- Patron saint: Maria SS. della Catena
- Saint day: 15 August and 11 January
- Website: www.comune.acicatena.ct.it

Aci Catena (Sicilian: Jaci Catina) is a town and comune in Metropolitan City of Catania, Sicily, southern Italy.

== Climate ==
The climate is generally mild. Winters are not always severe, and snowfall with accumulation is rare, though not uncommon. Notable instances occurred in 1925, 1956, December 1988, February 2006, January 2017, January 2019, and February 2021. Summers are typically hot and dry. Rainfall is mostly concentrated between October and March and can at times be intense, due in part to the stau effect, which significantly influences the pluviometry of the Acireale area.

== Etymology ==
The first part of the toponym, shared with other nearby municipalities, refers to the Jaci River. The second part refers to the town's patron saint, the Madonna della Catena.

=== Derived Toponyms ===
The name of Catenanuova, a municipality in the Province of Enna, is derived from Aci Catena. It was founded by Andrea Giuseppe Riggio-Statella, Prince of the Catena.

== History ==
The origins of Aci Catena and the other towns named Aci are traditionally linked to Xiphonia, a mysterious ancient Greek city that has completely disappeared. The poets Virgil and Ovid connected the foundation myth to the love story between the nymph Galatea and the shepherd Acis, along with the jealousy of the cyclops Polyphemus. During Greek and Roman times, a city called Akis (Ἄκις) existed and is recorded as having participated in the Punic Wars.

In the medieval period, the town was known as Jachium, and under Arab rule, it was referred to as Al-Yag. The historical developments of this period are closely associated with the Castle of Aci, which provides much of the available historical information. The Sanctuary of Maria Santissima di Valverde also dates back to this era.

Until the seventeenth century, the history of Aci Catena was largely shared with the other hamlets in the territory of Aci. Under Spanish rule during the seventeenth century, the significant economic growth of Aquilia Nuova, now Acireale, led to conflicts and rivalries with the surrounding settlements, which sought administrative independence. This resulted in the separation of the Aci hamlets and the establishment of distinct municipalities including Aci Catena, Aci Bonaccorsi (1652), Aci Castello (1647), Aci San Filippo and Aci Sant'Antonio (1628), Aci Platani (now a district of Acireale), and Aci Trezza (now a district of Aci Castello). Historically, Aci Catena was also known as Scarpi, possibly due to the presence of shoemakers in the area, while Aci San Filippo was referred to as Xacche.

=== The earthquake of 11 January 1693 ===
The earthquake of 1693 affected a wide area of eastern Sicily, from Messina to the Val di Noto. Based on contemporary sources, modern researchers estimate its magnitude at 7.4 on the Richter scale or XI on the Mercalli scale. Aci Catena was partially destroyed; the church housing a valuable fifteenth-century icon collapsed, although the altar, the icon, and the statue remained intact.

Unlike neighboring towns, records indicate that the town, then known as Scarpi, suffered fewer than one hundred casualties. The local population interpreted this as a miracle attributed to the Madonna della Catena, believed to have protected the town. The veneration of the Virgin of the Chain subsequently spread to nearby areas and continues to this day. For example, after the earthquake of 29–30 December 1908, the parish priest of Aci Catena, archpriest Salvatore Bella (later bishop of Acireale in 1922), wrote a hymn of thanksgiving titled "Ci Salvò." The piece was set to music by composer Giuseppe Monterosso in January 1909. This event is still commemorated annually on 11 January.

=== Later centuries ===
The town has experienced several other natural disasters throughout its history. These include:

The flood of 4 September 1761, caused by a violent storm that led to the overflow of the Lavinaio stream, The earthquake of 20 February 1818, with a magnitude of 6.0, centered between Aci Catena and Aci Sant'Antonio, The earthquake of 26 December 2018, with a magnitude of 4.9 and a depth of 1.2 kilometers, centered near Viagrande. Until 1828, the municipality of Aci San Filippo e Catena also included the districts of Aci Trezza and Ficarazzi, which were transferred to the administration of Aci Castello by royal decree that year.

== Monuments and places of interest ==
Chiesa Matrice

=== Religious architecture ===
- Sanctuary of Maria Santissima della Catena, the main church (chiesa madre) of Aci Catena.
- Basilica of San Filippo d'Agira, the main church of Aci San Filippo.
- Hermitage of Sant'Anna, a religious complex dating from the mid-18th century.
- Church of Santa Lucia, notable for its wooden roof, frescoes, and paintings by Paolo Vasta.
- Church of San Giuseppe, designed by Francesco Battaglia. Its unique Arab-Byzantine-style façade makes it architecturally distinctive in all of Sicily. The church features a scenic staircase made of white stone from Syracuse. Inside is an altarpiece by Lorenzo Gramiccia, dated 1740, depicting the Flight into Egypt of the Holy Family.
- Church of Saint Anthony of Padua, converted in the late 19th century into the municipal building. It houses a wooden crucifix by Giovan Francesco Pitorno, better known as Friar Umile da Petralia, from the 17th century.
- Church of Santa Maria del Suffragio, the first parish church of Aci Catena, later replaced by the Sanctuary of Santa Maria della Catena.

=== Other ===
- Archaeological area of Santa Venera al Pozzo, an example of a late-imperial Roman thermal bath complex.
- Water mills of Aci Catena
- Palazzo Riggio, Aci Catena

== Society ==
=== Traditions and folklore ===
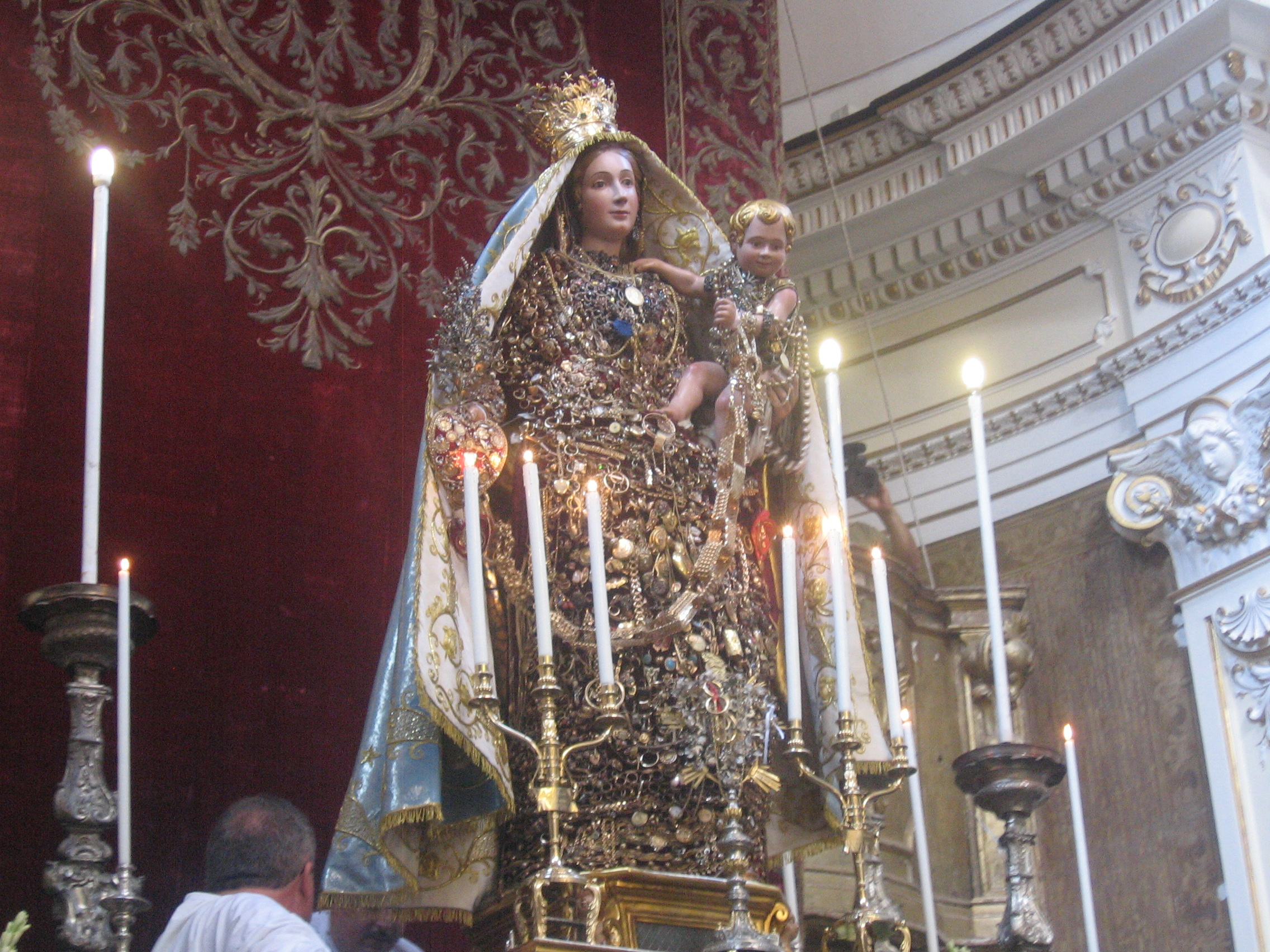
The Simulacrum of Maria SS.ma della Catena, Patroness of the City

Various festivals are held in connection with religious holidays and in honor of saints:

- 11 January – Thanksgiving celebration to the Holy Patroness for protecting the population during the 1693 earthquake.
- Good Friday – Procession of the 18th-century simulacrum of the Dead Christ and of the Our Lady of Sorrows from the Church of Santa Lucia (even years) or from the Church of Saint James the Apostle (odd years) to the Church of Saints Helena and Constantine. The five city Archconfraternities take part: Suffragio, Santissimo Sacramento al turno, Santa Barbara, Immacolata, and Santissimo Sacramento in Santa Lucia. Tradition includes the firing of a cannon shot every hour from dawn until the end of the Dead Christ's procession.
- 15 August – Summer feast in honor of the Madonna della Catena, Patroness of the city. The simulacrum of the Madonna, adorned with numerous gold ornaments donated over the years in gratitude for blessings received, is carried in procession through the streets on a fercolo by the faithful. Key moments include the arrival of pilgrims from various towns of the Etna region (notably Misterbianco and Acitrezza) throughout the night of 14–15 August; in the morning, the moving unveiling of the miraculous simulacrum of the Holy Patroness amid tears and acclamations; the traditional and striking "Trasuta o chianu" (run into the square) of the fercolo; and a colorful fireworks display that concludes the day. Strong devotion and faith are interwoven with Sicilian folklore.
- 13 December – Solemn celebrations in honor of Saint Lucy, including a procession of the simulacrum through the Santa Lucia district and the city of Aci Catena. Recognized in both eastern and western Sicily, attendees also come from Calabria, Apulia, and Campania, drawn by both the solemnity of the liturgical services and the folkloric aspects of the external festivities, especially the moment the statue leaves the church and the fireworks show, with the traditional launch of 'nzareddi (streamers). Noteworthy is the aesthetic and artistic beauty of the wooden simulacrum of the Saint.

=== The co-patron Saint Candido Martyr ===
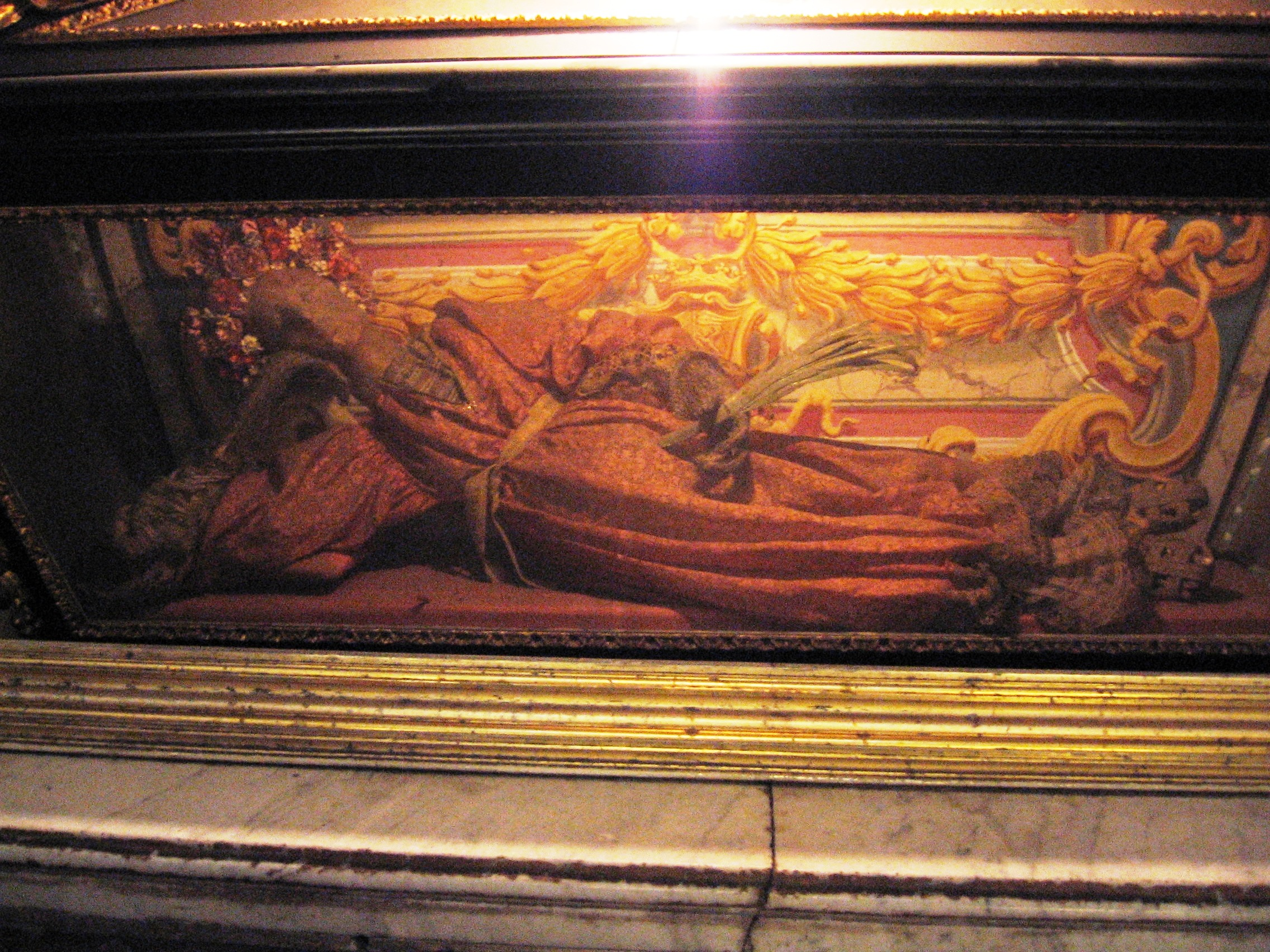
The body of Saint Candido Martyr – Co-patron of the City

The veneration of the corpo santo named Candido in "Scarpi" (now Aci Catena) dates back to 1710, when the Princes Riggio of Campofranco and Campofiorito, who settled in Scarpi in 1672, donated the relics of Saint Candido Martyr to the Church of Santa Maria della Catena along with a marble altar from the same period. The relics, originally taken from the Catacomb of San Callisto in Rome, were gifted by Cardinal Vicar Gaspero Carpineo to Don Pietro di Campofiorito and then passed on to Prince Luigi II. Today, the corpo santo is kept in a crystal urn beneath the main altar, although this was likely not its original placement. A small square in the historic city center is named after Saint Candido.

== Main sights ==
Among the churches in town are the Santuario Maria Santissima della Catena, San Giuseppe and Santa Lucia.

== Twin towns ==
- Ceuta, Spain
- Catenanuova, Italy
- Campofiorito, Italy
