= Gordoservon =

Medieval Byzantine city

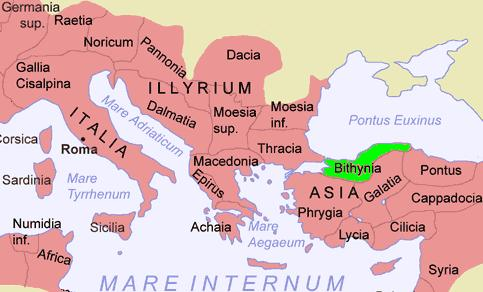
Bithynia marked in radium green

Gordoservon or Gordoserbon or Gordoserba (Greek: Γορδόσερβον; Serbian: Гордосервон, Гордосербон) was an early medieval Byzantine city, and a bishopric, suffragan of the Metropolis of Nicaea, in the region of Bithynia, Asia Minor. It is mentioned in several ecclesiastical sources from the period between the 7th and the 9th century. Most notably, the city is mentioned in the acts of the Council of Trullo (691-692), as a seat of bishop Isidore, who attended the council.

The exact location of this city, and etymology of its name, have been a subject of interest for scholars, who proposed several solutions for both questions.

== History ==
In the 7th century, the Byzantine Emperors Constans II (in 657–658) and Justinian II (in 688–689) led expeditions against the Balkan Slavs as far as rivers Struma and Vardar in the region of Macedonia. Many of the conquered tribes were transferred to the Opsikion district of northwestern Asia Minor. Part of those Asia Minor Slavs deserted to the Arabs in 665 and again in 692. As the name of the city could suggest that among its founders were Serbs, some modern scholars consider that the colony was founded by these Slavs, and variously date it to 649, 667, 680, or 688–689. According to Sima Ćirković it is possible that some Serbs which populated Gordoservon were brought from an area near Thessaloniki.

Similarly, in 1129–1130 some Serbs were likely settled in Bithynia by John II Komnenos, due to the mention of a settlement called Servochōria (Greek: Σερβοχώρια) near Nicomedia, mentioned in the 13th century source Partitio regni Graeci (1204). Some identified Gordoserba with this Servochōria, but the connection is uncertain.

Up to the 20th century, Gordo-Servorum or Gordoservae was commonly equated with nova Juliopolis, which in turn was equated with Gordium (capital of Phrygia) or another place with the same name Gordion, Gordenorum, Gordiu-come(nis), Gordiū-tīchos which became known as Juliopolis (Iuliogordus) according to several 1st-century BCE up to 2nd century CE sources. William Mitchell Ramsay (1890) connected Justinianopolis-Mela, called Nova Justinianopolis Gordi (680), with the bishoprics of Gordoserboi or Gordoserba in Bithynia, Gordorounia or Gordorinia in Phrygia Salutaris, and Gordou-Kome, the former name of Juliopolis in Galatia, and that an ancient country or district along the Sangarios River was called Gordos. Additionally, he argued that Gordoserba was formed into bishopric by Justinian I in the 6th century. Siméon Vailhé, writing for the Catholic Encyclopedia (1913) considered, like Michel Le Quien, that Juliopolis of Nicaea of Bithynia was identical to Gordoserboi, because otherwise the exact location, titulars, and bishops are unknown; and that it should not be confused with Juliopolis of former Gordium.

However, Peter Charanis, analyzing the sources on the early Slavs of Asia Minor, noted that the sources are ambiguous on the exact date of migration, especially concerning Constans II, and that the first certain mention of the place is in 692, during the Quinisext Council, where was mentioned Isidore "ἀνάξιος ἐπίσκοπος Γορδοσέρβων τῆς Βιθυνῶν ἐπαρχίας" ("unworthy bishop of Gordoserba of the province of the Bithynians"). If the settlement is related to the Serbs then it contradicts the date of the Ecthesis of pseudo-Epiphanius (640), a list of cities and bishoprics which mentions Gordoservorum or Gordoserboi in the Metropolis of Nicaea in the province of Bithynia. Charanis and other scholars doubt the Slavic-Serbian origin of the city because among the known bishops (Isidoros, Neophytos, Stephanos) there are none with Slavic names, and due to the uncertainty around the etymology of the Serbian ethnonym.

== Etymology ==
Ladislav Zgusta considered that "-serba" has nothing to do with Slavs and pointed to toponyms such as Άνάζαρβος and Ανάζαρβα Καμουή σαρβον (Anazarbus), while Heinrich Kunstmann argued that if Gordoserba and Servochōria are identical then both cannot have a connection to John II Komnenos's activity in the 12th century, and contrary to Zgusta, Servochōria most probably means "Serbian land". Predrag Komatina also argued Serbian connection, but denied that "gordo-" derives from Proto-Slavic *gordъ (fortification, city) because Gordos was a name for a district where the settlement was situated and hence the meaning would have been "the place of the Gordos Serbs" rather than "the city of the Serbs".

== Sources ==
- Darrouzès, Jean, ed. (1981). Notitiae Episcopatuum Ecclesiae Constantinopolitanae. Paris: Institut français d'études byzantines.
- Gelzer, Heinrich, ed. (1900). Ungedruckte und ungenügend veröffentlichte Texte der Notitiae episcopatuum. München: Akademie der Wissenschaften.
- Komatina, Predrag (2014). "Settlement of the Slavs in Asia Minor During the Rule of Justinian II and the Bishopric των Γορδοσερβων" (PDF). Београдски историјски гласник: Belgrade Historical Review. 5: 33–42.
- Ohme, Heinz (1990). Das Concilium Quinisextum und seine Bischofsliste: Studien zum Konstantinopeler Konzil von 692. Berlin: Walter de Gruyter. ISBN 978-3-11-086332-1.
- Ostrogorsky, George (1956). History of the Byzantine State. Oxford: Basil Blackwell.
- Ostrogorsky, George (1959). "Byzantine Cities in the Early Middle Ages". Dumbarton Oaks Papers. 13: 45–66. doi:10.2307/1291128. JSTOR 1291128.
- Parthey, Gustav, ed. (1866). Hieroclis Synecdemus et notitiae Graecae episcopatuum: Accedunt Nili Doxapatrii notitia patriarchatuum et locorum nomina immutata. Berolini: In aedibus Friderici Nicolai.
- Ramsay, William M. (1890). The Historical Geography of Asia Minor. London: John Murray. ISBN 978-1-108-01453-3.
- Slijepčević, Đoko M. (1958). The Macedonian Question: The Struggle for Southern Serbia. Chicago: The American Institute for Balkan Affairs.
