= San Giuseppe, Aci Catena =

Church in Sicily, Italy

Coordinates: 37.59897°N 15.14000°E

Santa Giuseppe is a Baroque style, Roman Catholic parish church located in Aci Catena in the region of Sicily, Italy.

== History and description ==
The church was commissioned by the prince Riggio di Campofiorito and built between 1728 and 1740. In 1763, a new facade was built with the flanking bell-towers designed by Francesco Battaglia. The centralized church rises at the end of Via San Giuseppe, and sits well above the street level. The approach is via two semicircular staircases, creating a round balcony in front of the facade. The two flanking towers are topped by onion domes, but the facade is sober and simple. The portal has a rounded tympanum, while above on the next story is a triangular tympanum. Behind the tympanum rises the dome of the circular church.

The main altarpiece is a large canvas depicting The Flight to Egypt (1740) by Lorenzo Gramiccia.
