= Catenanuova =

Catenanuova Catinanova (Sicilian)
- Comune
- Comune di Catenanuova
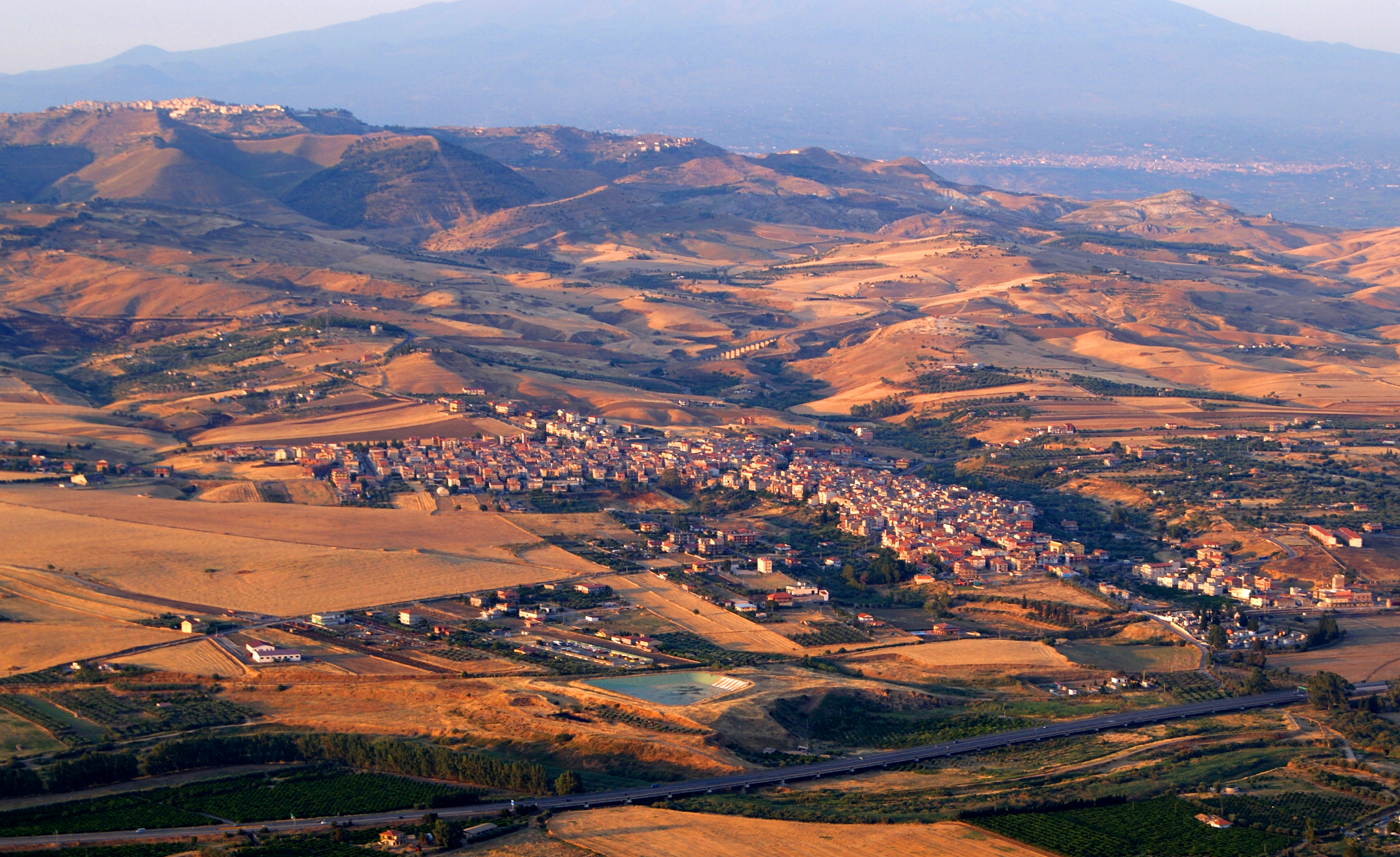
- Aerial view of Catenanuova

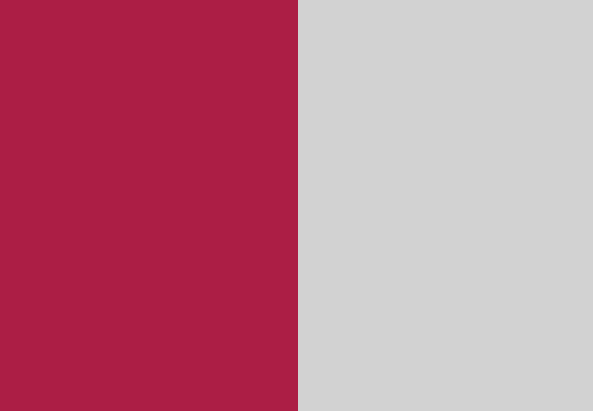
- Flag

- Location within Italy Location within Sicily
- Coordinates: 37°34′N 14°41′E
- Country: Italy
- Region: Sicily
- Province: Enna (EN)

Government
  - Mayor: Carmelo Scravaglieri

Area
  - Total: 11.22 km^{2} (4.33 sq mi)
- Elevation: 170 m (560 ft)

Population (2026)
  - Total: 4,458
  - Density: 397.3/km^{2} (1,029/sq mi)
- Demonym: Catenanuovesi
- Time zone: UTC+1 (CET)
  - Summer (DST): UTC+2 (CEST)
- Postal code: 94010
- Dialing code: 0935
- Patron saint: St. Prosper
- Saint day: Last Sunday in September
- Website: Official website

Catenanuova (Sicilian: Catinanova) is a town and comune (municipality) in the province of Enna in the autonomous island region of Sicily in Italy. It has 4,458 inhabitants.

== History ==
Catenanuova was founded between 1727 and 1733 by Andrea Giuseppe Riggio-Statella, Prince of Aci Catena, to fulfil the last wishes of his mother, the Baroness Anna Maria Statella (died 1717) who wanted "to revive happy memories of childhood" after the 1693 Sicily earthquake had decimated her husband's family. A notarized document dated February 9, 1733 attests to the existence of Catenanuova at that date. Between 1731 and 1736 Catenanuova became a small urban center with full autonomy. The name of the town derived from Aci Catena and changed from Terra della Nuova Catena to Catena la Nuova to the present Catenanuova.

== Geography ==
Catenanuova is located in the Dittaino valley, 38 km (24 mi) East from its provincial capital Enna and 35 km (22 mi) west from Catania. It is connected to the latter and to Palermo by both railway and the A19 highway.

=== Climate ===
Catenanuova's ambient temperature and rainfall are recorded by a remote telemetry station operated by Sicily's Department of Water and Waste, which on August 10, 1999 measured a maximum of 48.5 °C (119.3 °F). However, Catenanuova is not a World Meteorological Organization surface station – the nearest being c.37 km (23 mi) away at Enna – and the WMO's officially recognized European maximum is 48.8 °C (119.8 °F), recorded on August 11, 2021 in Floridia, Sicily.

Climate data for Catenanuova 170 m. asl, 1991–2020 normals, extremes 1959–present
Month	Jan	Feb	Mar	Apr	May	Jun	Jul	Aug	Sep	Oct	Nov	Dec	Year
Record high °C (°F)	29.8 (85.6)	32.8 (91.0)	33.1 (91.6)	37.8 (100.0)	41.9 (107.4)	45.5 (113.9)	47.2 (117.0)	48.5 (119.3)	42.7 (108.9)	38.0 (100.4)	29.6 (85.3)	27.6 (81.7)	48.5 (119.3)
Mean daily maximum °C (°F)	15.9 (60.6)	16.2 (61.2)	19.4 (66.9)	22.6 (72.7)	28.2 (82.8)	33.4 (92.1)	36.6 (97.9)	36.7 (98.1)	31.7 (89.1)	26.5 (79.7)	20.7 (69.3)	16.6 (61.9)	25.4 (77.7)
Daily mean °C (°F)	11.0 (51.8)	11.0 (51.8)	13.4 (56.1)	16.1 (61.0)	20.9 (69.6)	25.8 (78.4)	28.9 (84.0)	29.3 (84.7)	25.2 (77.4)	20.9 (69.6)	15.8 (60.4)	12.1 (53.8)	19.2 (66.6)
Mean daily minimum °C (°F)	6.1 (43.0)	5.8 (42.4)	7.3 (45.1)	9.6 (49.3)	13.6 (56.5)	18.2 (64.8)	21.2 (70.2)	21.8 (71.2)	18.7 (65.7)	15.2 (59.4)	10.9 (51.6)	7.6 (45.7)	13.0 (55.4)
Record low °C (°F)	−2.0 (28.4)	−4.8 (23.4)	−2.3 (27.9)	1.5 (34.7)	5.7 (42.3)	9.7 (49.5)	11.1 (52.0)	15.1 (59.2)	10.0 (50.0)	6.4 (43.5)	1.1 (34.0)	−1.4 (29.5)	−4.8 (23.4)
Average precipitation mm (inches)	42.6 (1.68)	47.7 (1.88)	45.6 (1.80)	28.5 (1.12)	16.0 (0.63)	6.3 (0.25)	2.1 (0.08)	3.8 (0.15)	18.5 (0.73)	49.3 (1.94)	53.3 (2.10)	56.5 (2.22)	370.2 (14.58)
Average precipitation days (≥ 1.0 mm)	5.4	4.7	4.8	3.0	1.6	0.7	0.2	0.3	2.0	3.8	5.5	5.6	37.6
Average relative humidity (%)	78	76	78	76	78	78	78	78	77	77	74	77	77
Source: Osservatorio delle Acque

== Demographics ==
As of 2026, the population is 4,458, of which 49.4% are male, and 50.6% are female. Minors make up 16.4% of the population, and seniors make up 22.8%.

Historical population

Year	Pop.	±%
1861	1,679	—
1871	1,737	+3.5%
1881	2,036	+17.2%
1901	2,392	+17.5%
1911	2,411	+0.8%
1921	2,767	+14.8%
1931	2,904	+5.0%
1936	3,171	+9.2%

Year	Pop.	±%
1951	3,993	+25.9%
1961	4,406	+10.3%
1971	4,121	−6.5%
1981	4,420	+7.3%
1991	5,073	+14.8%
2001	4,876	−3.9%
2011	4,999	+2.5%
2021	4,546	−9.1%

Source: ISTAT

=== Immigration ===
As of 2025, immigrants make up 7.7% of the total population. The 5 largest foreign countries of birth are Germany, Romania, Tunisia, The Gambia, and Argentina.

== Economy ==
Catenanuova is classified as rural municipality. The main activities are agriculture (wheat, citrus, vegetables), and craft manufacturing (in iron and wood). The entrepreneurship index of Catenanuova was 43.27/1000 pop in 2001.

== Monuments and places of interest ==
Parish Church of Saint Joseph

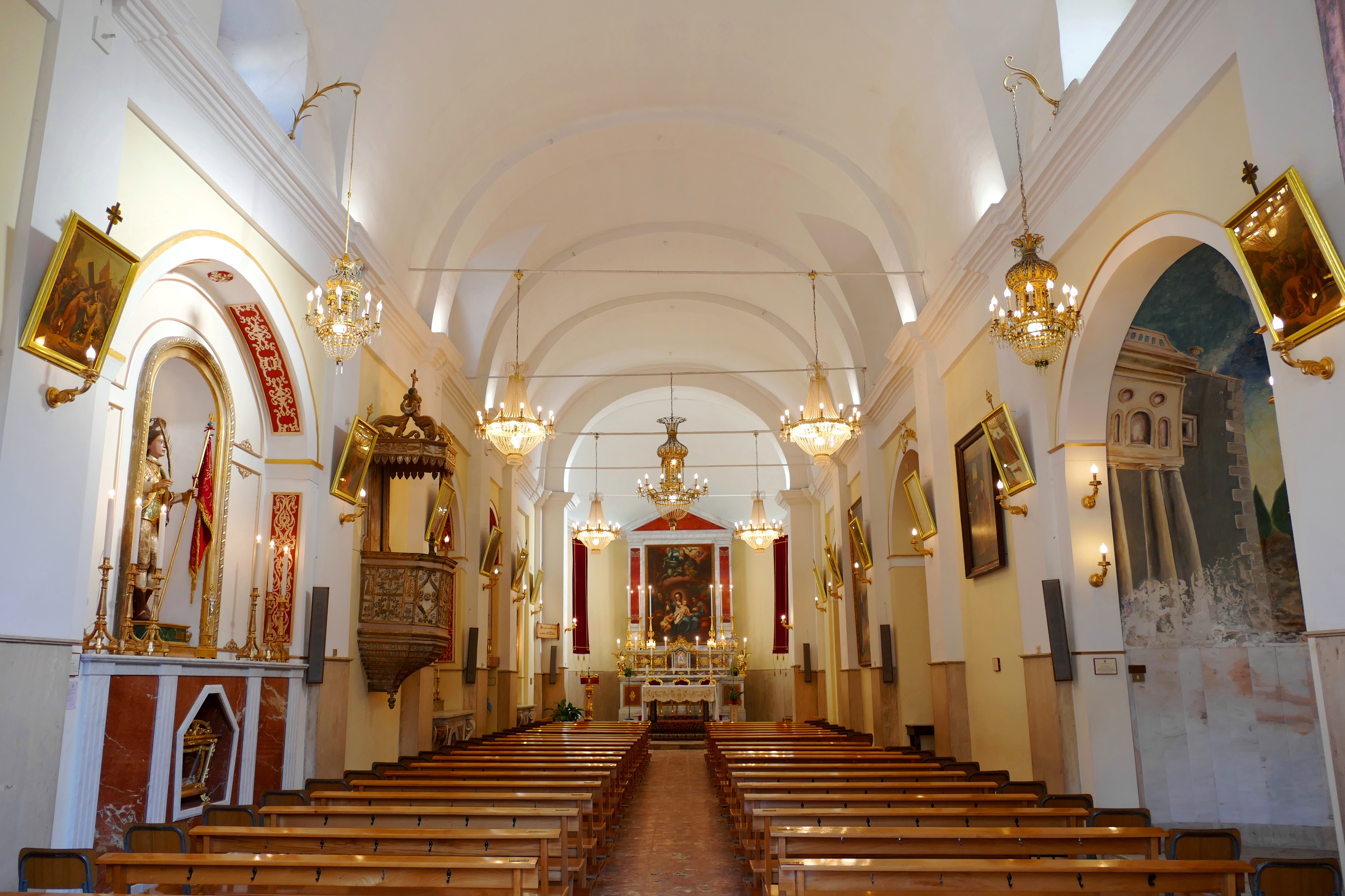
Church of Saint Joseph – 1694

It stands in Piazza Aldo Moro, opposite the Town Hall, and is dedicated to Saint Joseph. It was built by Prince Antonino Giuseppe Riggio Saladino after the 1693 earthquake to serve the needs of his fiefdom. Following the founding of Catenanuova, completed in 1736, the church became a parish in 1738. Initially, the church had a single nave; around 1757, it was expanded with the construction of a secondary nave housing the altar of the Blessed Sacrament, and in 1767, the bell tower was added. Around the mid-19th century, three more arches were built, doubling the size of the building, which still retains this structure today. It houses sacred artworks, including the painting of the Holy Family, a masterpiece of the late Baroque period, and the statue of the patron saint Saint Prosperus.

Church of Mary Most Holy Immaculate

The church dedicated to the Blessed Virgin Mary Immaculate is the second most important and largest among Catenanuova's churches. Located on Corso Vittorio Emanuele III, it was built in 1908 following the bequest of a local bourgeois, Carmelo Bonanno, exactly 50 years after the apparition of the Virgin Mary at Lourdes, which occurred on February 11, 1858.

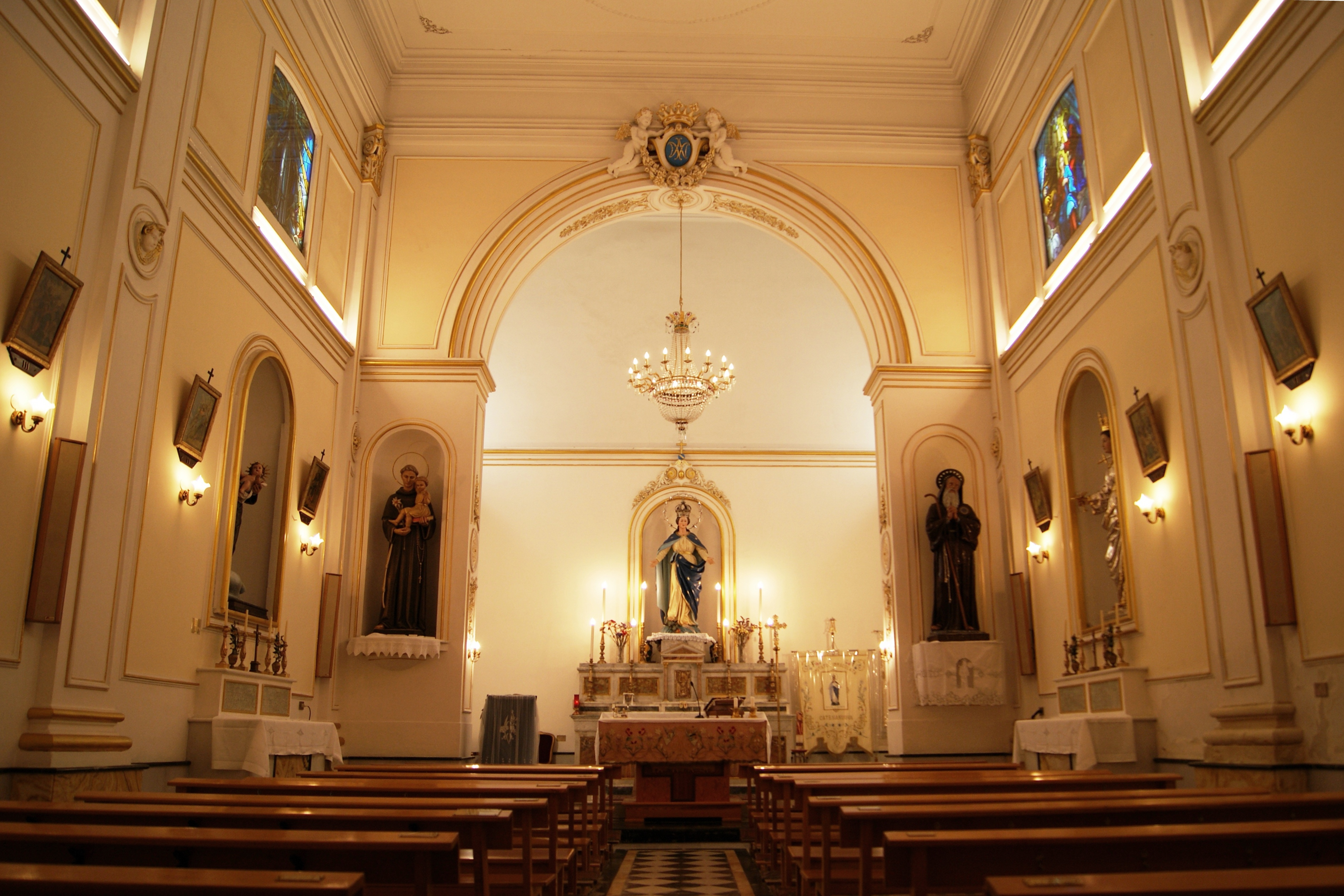
Interior of the Church of Mary Most Holy Immaculate

Carmelo Bonanno reportedly had only one daughter, named Santa, who eloped to marry a young man of lower social standing. Opposed by her family, she fell ill and died in 1884. After being struck by illness himself, the father, to atone for the severity that had led to his daughter's death, decided to leave all his assets, after his wife Carmela Guardali's death, to the Parish of Saint Joseph for the construction of a new church, intended to house the statue of the Immaculate Conception that had been exposed to the elements in a roadside niche in the Vigne district.

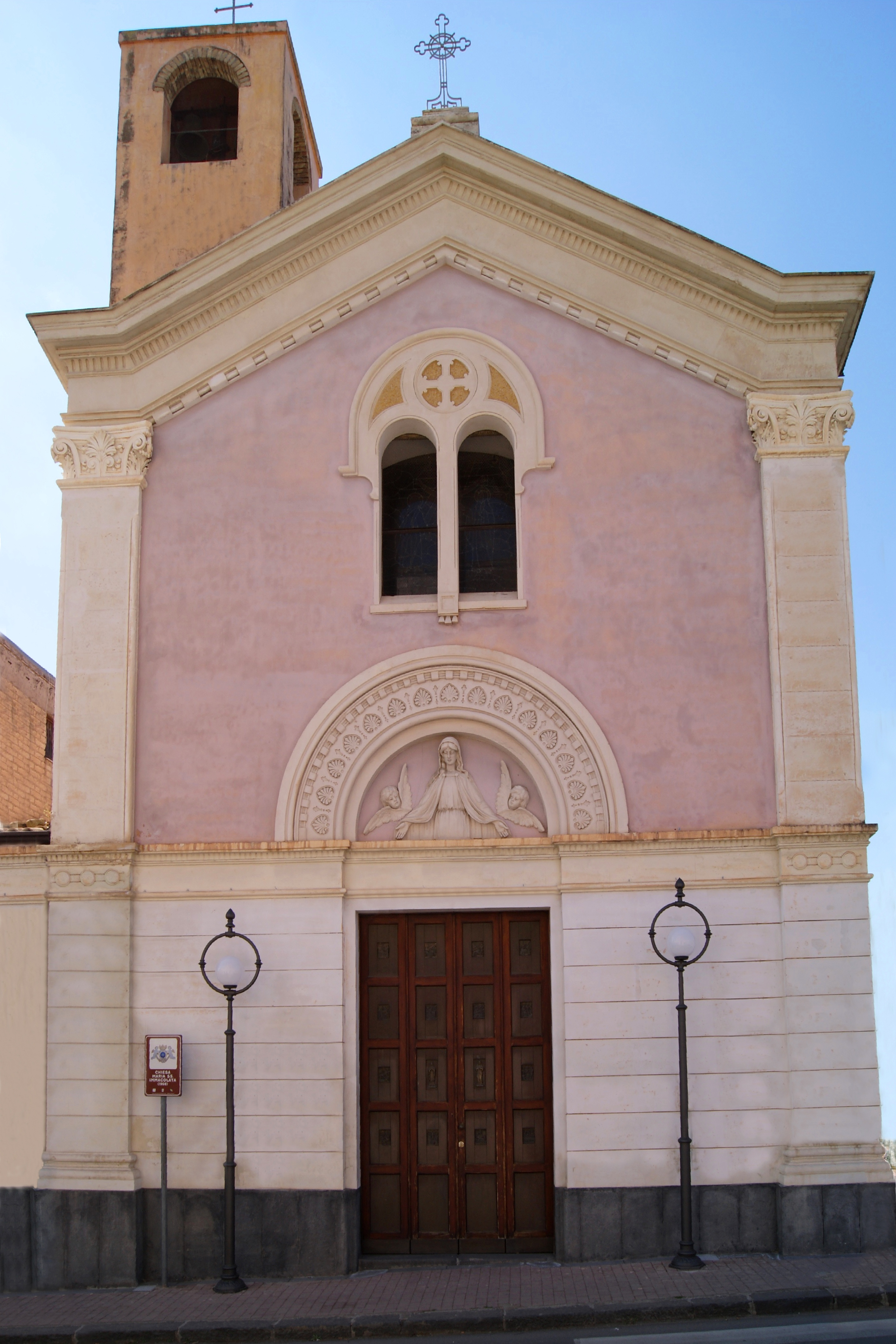
Church of Mary Most Holy Immaculate – 1908

The executor of the will, however, refused to carry out the testamentary provisions. In 1894, the new parish priest of Saint Joseph, Gioacchino Tornatore (1894–1934), legally reclaimed Bonanno's donation, and the executor's heirs, who had since died, were forced to surrender the funds required for the church's construction. It was opened for worship on April 1, 1908, by Monsignor Ferdinando Fiandaca, Bishop of Nicosia, thus becoming a subsidiary of the Church of Saint Joseph.

A plaque inside the church commemorates the event: This temple, dedicated to Mary Most Holy Immaculate, was erected by the testamentary will of citizen Carmelo Bonanno through the diligence and dedication of parish priest Don Gioacchino Tornatore, who reclaimed its rights after nearly thirty years. MCMVIII.

In the late 1950s, the bell tower was erected. In 1994, restoration work was carried out to improve the roof and interiors. In addition to the ancient wooden effigy of the Immaculate Conception from 1870, the church also houses papier-mâché statues of Saint Cajetan (1908) and Saint Francis of Paola (1930), wooden statues of Saint Anthony of Padua (2000) and Saint Lucy of Syracuse (2004), and six stained-glass windows of Florentine craftsmanship, also from 2004. In 2008, on the occasion of its centenary, the façade was restored, and the interior stuccoes were gilded.

=== Other churches ===
Church of Saint Clare, built in 1930 Sanctuary of Mary Most Holy of the Rosary of Monte Scalpello, founded by three hermit monks in 1524, visitable on the first Sunday of May and the first Sunday of October for their respective feasts; accessible from the Catenanuova exit on the A19 motorway and proceeding along State Road 192 towards Enna. Cemetery Church, late 19th century.

=== Civil architecture ===
Fondaco Cuba

The Fondaco Cuba is an early 18th-century inn, declared a historical-artistic landmark by the Superintendency of Cultural and Environmental Heritage of Enna. Due to its history, it is the oldest building in Catenanuova.

=== Natural areas ===
San Prospero Park

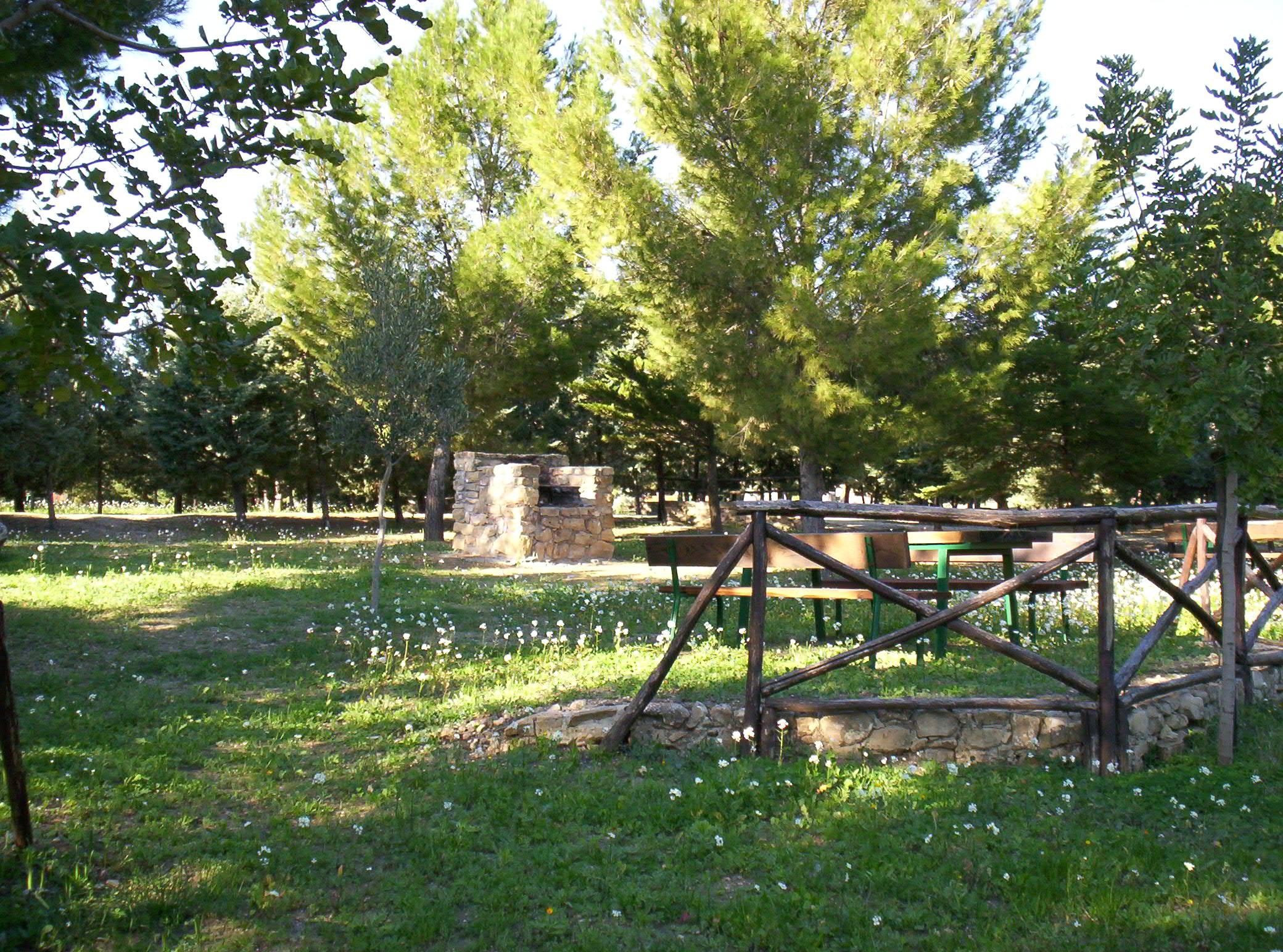
View of San Prospero Park

San Prospero Park in Catenanuova is so named because, until 1985, the proceeds from the harvest collected there were used by the municipal administration to fund the feast of the patron saint Saint Prosperus the martyr.

On September 12, 1985, the Municipality signed an agreement with the Regional Forestry Inspectorate of Enna to create a green recreational area, unique in the district. It covers 4 hectares of land with over two thousand trees and is located in the Censi district, in the upper part of Catenanuova. It is rich in firs, cypresses, pines, and other tree species, which divide the entire area into four equal parts, bordered by walkways—one designated for children's play areas and the other three furnished with picnic tables and, notably, stone barbecues.

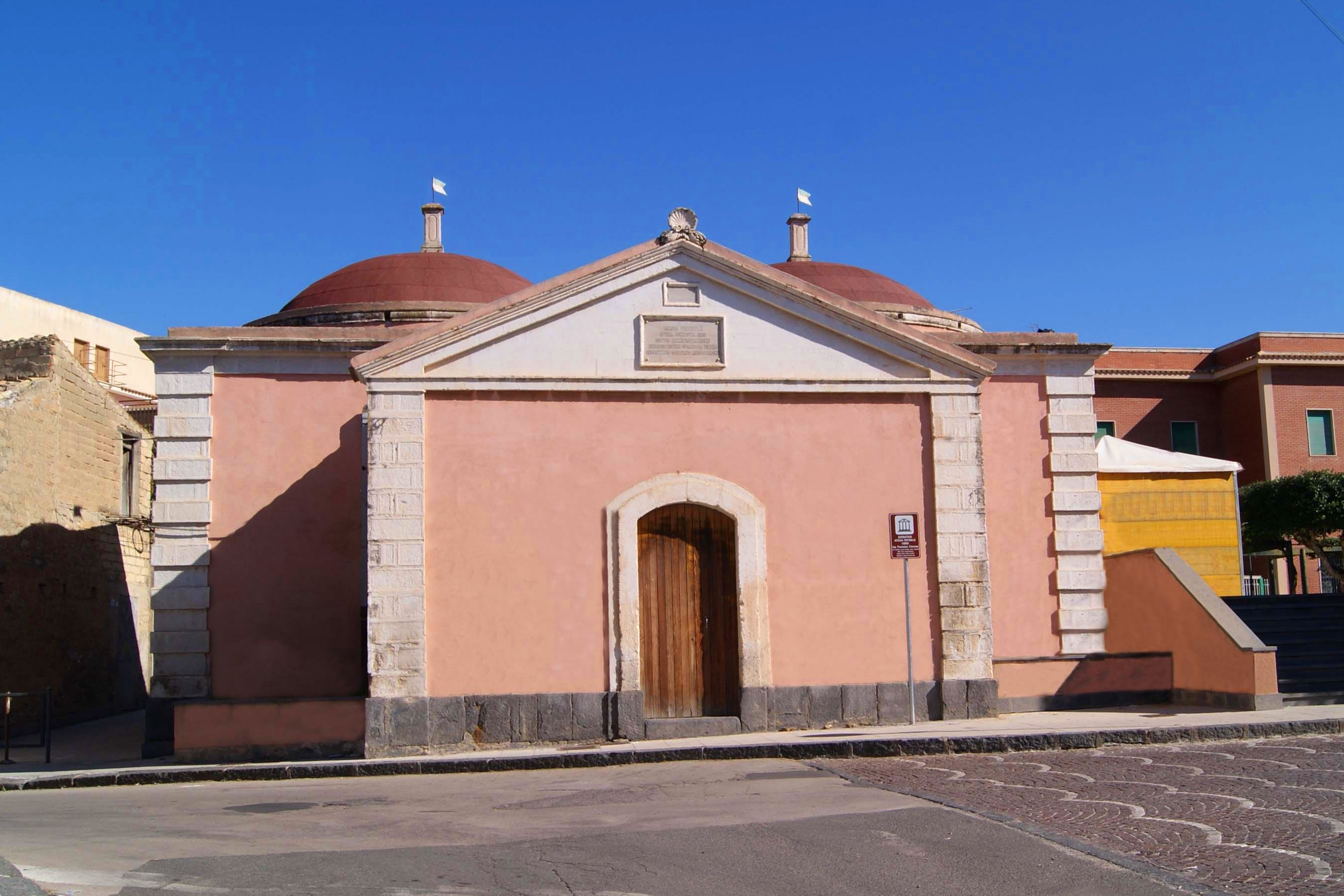
Old drinking water reservoir, 1899 – Engineer Francesco Clarenza

== Culture ==
The most important festival in Catenanuova is the one in honor of the patron saints Saint Prosperus the martyr and Mary Most Holy of Grace, held annually from the penultimate to the last Sunday of September.

The festival was established in 1752 by the founder of Catenanuova, Andrea Giuseppe Riggio-Statella, Prince of La Catena, who brought the relics of the martyr Prosperus to the town, extracted from the Catacombs of San Callisto in Rome.

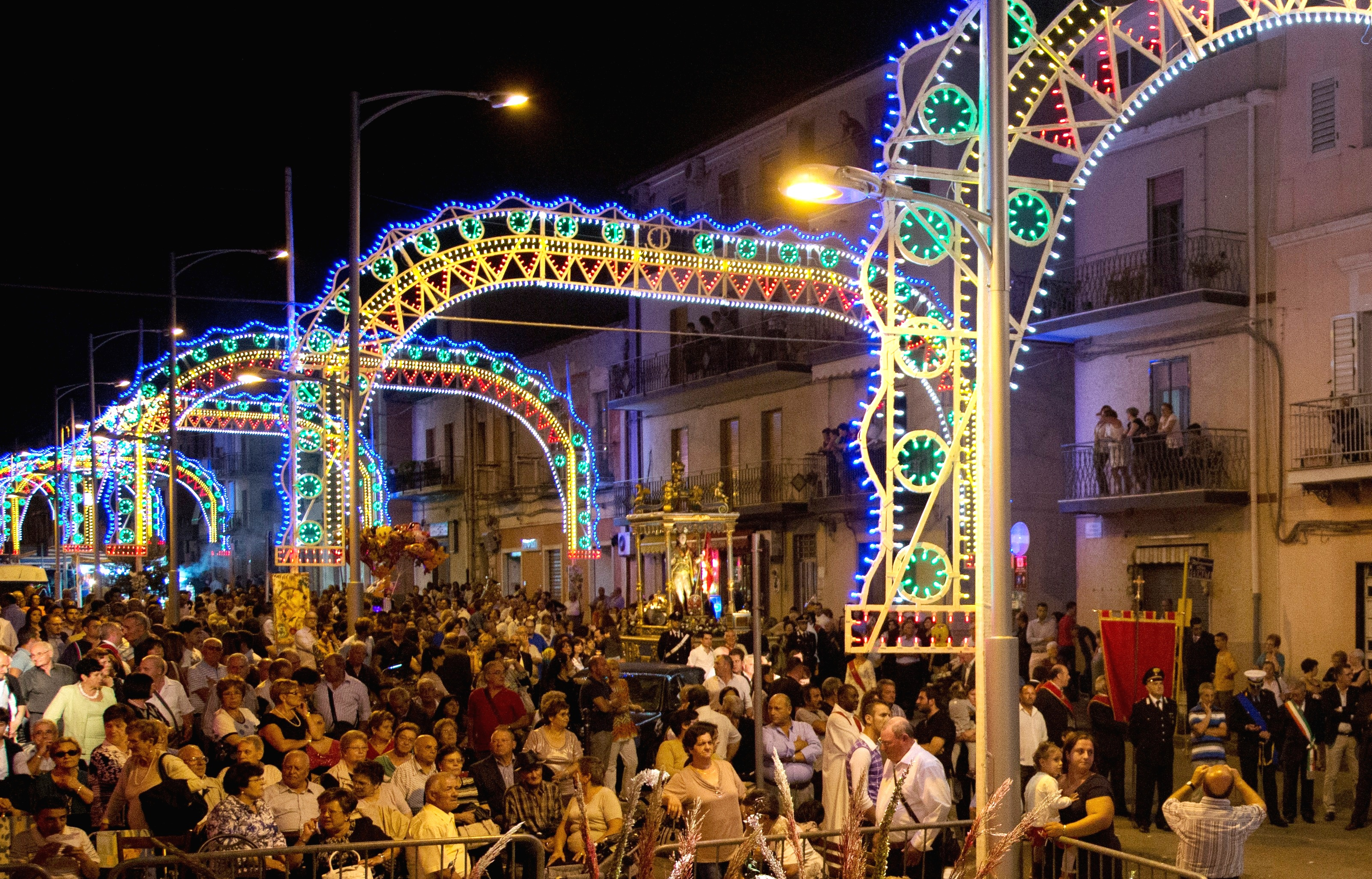
The procession of Saint Prosperus the martyr; last Sunday of September

The penultimate Sunday of September celebrates the co-patroness, Mary Most Holy of Grace.

From Thursday to the following Saturday, a three-day prayer period in honor of the patron saint takes place, and on the last Sunday of September, the solemnity of Saint Prosperus the martyr is observed.

=== Symbols ===
On April 7, 2003, the new coat of arms and municipal banner were granted (see Armorial of Saints).

Party per bend arched: the first, azure, a tower or, masoned sable, closed and windowed of the same, embattled of three, each merlon itself embattled with three small merlons in the Guelphic style, accompanied by the point of a halberd, bendwise, argent, the tower accompanied below by four six-pointed stars or, three and one, alternating with a diminished fess of the same; the second, or, a book argent, open, with edges gules, accompanied in chief by a rainbow of five stripes, azure, or, gules, argent, vert; the third, sky blue, the effigy of Saint Prosperus the Martyr, depicted as the patron saint of Catenanuova, in majesty, haloed or, the face, hands, and legs in natural flesh tones, hair sable, clad in a tunic or, with a collar argent, an open over-tunic azure, with a great mantle gules, wearing leather boots in their natural color, the saint holding in the right hand the palm of martyrdom vert, in the left hand a standard purpure with a staff sable, the effigy resting on a small base or, standing in base. Beneath the shield, on a bifid and flowing ribbon or, the motto in capital letters sable: LEX DOCTRINA ET LABOR MUNUS MEUM. Exterior ornaments of a municipality.

— D.P.R. 07.04.2003

The banner is a purple drape.

== Economy ==
The main activities are agriculture (wheat, citrus groves, vegetables) and handicrafts (wood and ironworking). Due to the countless wheat fields surrounding it, the town is nicknamed the "city of wheat."
