= Bellanova =

Bellanova is an Italian surname from the province of Brindisi. It may refer to the following people:

- Raoul Bellanova (born 2000), Italian football player
- Teresa Bellanova (born 1958), Italian politician and trade unionist

== See also ==
- Belanova, Mexican pop band
- Campofiorito, a town in the Metropolitan City of Palermo, known in the Middle Ages as Bellanova
