= Diocese of Nicosia =

Diocese of Nicosia may refer to:

- Roman Catholic Diocese of Nicosia, Sicily
- Latin Catholic Archdiocese of Nicosia
