= Giuseppe Saladino =

Italian Roman Catholic prelate

Most Reverend Giuseppe Saladino
- Bishop of Siracusa
- Church: Catholic Church
- Diocese: Diocese of Siracusa
- In office: 1604–1611
- Predecessor: Juan Castellano Orozco
- Successor: Juan Torres de Osorio

Orders
- Consecration: 7 June 1604 by Camillo Borghese

Personal details
- Born: 1556 Palermo, Italy
- Died: 22 November 1611 (aged 54–55) Siracusa, Italy

Giuseppe Saladino (1556 – 22 November 1611) was a Roman Catholic prelate who served as Bishop of Siracusa (1604–1611).

== Biography ==
Giuseppe Saladino was born in Palermo, Italy in 1556. On 31 May 1604, he was appointed during the papacy of Pope Clement VIII as Bishop of Siracusa. On 7 June 1604, he was consecrated bishop by Camillo Borghese, Cardinal-Priest of San Crisogono, with Agostino Quinzio, Bishop of Korčula, and Leonard Abel, Titular Bishop of Sidon, serving as co-consecrators. He served as Bishop of Siracusa until his death on 22 November 1611.

== External links and additional sources ==
- Cheney, David M. "Archdiocese of Siracusa". Catholic-Hierarchy.org. (for Chronology of Bishops) ^{[self-published]}
- Chow, Gabriel. "Archdiocese of Siracusa (Italy)". GCatholic.org. (for Chronology of Bishops) ^{[self-published]}

Catholic Church titles
| Preceded by Juan Castellano Orozco | Bishop of Siracusa; 1604–1611 | Succeeded by Juan Torres de Osorio |
