= Campofiorito =

Campofiorito Campuciurutu (Sicilian)
- Comune
- Comune di Campofiorito
- Location within Italy Location within Sicily
- Coordinates: 37°45′N 13°16′E
- Country: Italy
- Region: Sicily
- Metropolitan city: Palermo (PA)

Government
  - Mayor: Giuseppe Oddo

Area
  - Total: 21.7 km^{2} (8.4 sq mi)
- Elevation: 660 m (2,170 ft)

Population (30 April 2017)
  - Total: 1,291
  - Density: 59.5/km^{2} (154/sq mi)
- Demonym: Compofioritani
- Time zone: UTC+1 (CET)
  - Summer (DST): UTC+2 (CEST)
- Postal code: 90030
- Dialing code: 091
- Website: Official website

Campofiorito (Sicilian: Campuciurutu) is a comune (municipality) in the Metropolitan City of Palermo in the Italian region of Sicily, located about 40 kilometres (25 mi) south of Palermo.

Campofiorito borders the following municipalities: Bisacquino, Contessa Entellina, Corleone.

== Twin towns and sister cities ==
Campofiorito is twinned with:

- Aci Catena, Italy
- Catenanuova, Italy
