= Juan Torres de Osorio =

17th-century Spanish Catholic bishop

Most Reverend Juan Torres de Osorio
- Bishop of Valladolid
- Church: Catholic Church
- Diocese: Diocese of Valladolid
- In office: 1627–1632
- Predecessor: Alfonso López Gallo
- Successor: Gregorio Pedrosa Cásares
- Previous posts: Bishop of Siracusa (1613–1619); Bishop of Catania (1619–1624); Bishop of Oviedo (1624–1627)

Orders
- Consecration: 24 November 1613 by Paolo Emilio Sfondrati

Personal details
- Born: 16 January 1562 Cuéllar, Spain
- Died: 23 September 1632 (age 70) Valladolid, Spain

Juan Torres de Osorio (1562–1632) was a Roman Catholic prelate who served as Bishop of Valladolid (1627–1632), Bishop of Oviedo (1624–1627), Bishop of Catania (1619–1624), and Bishop of Siracusa (1613–1619).

== Biography ==
Juan Torres de Osorio was born in Cuéllar, Spain on 16 January 1562. On 13 November 1613, he was appointed during the papacy of Pope Paul V as Bishop of Siracusa. On 24 November 1613, he was consecrated bishop by Paolo Emilio Sfondrati, Cardinal-Bishop of Albano, with Antonio d'Aquino, Bishop of Sarno, and Domingo de Oña, Bishop of Gaeta, serving as co-consecrators. On 19 October 1619, he was appointed during the papacy of Pope Paul V as Bishop of Catania. On 22 April 1624, he was selected as Bishop of Oviedo and confirmed by Pope Urban VIII on 29 May 1624. On 7 March 1627, he was selected as Bishop of Valladolid and confirmed by Pope Urban VIII on 19 July 1627. He served as Bishop of Valladolid until his death on 23 September 1632.

While bishop, Osorio was the principal co-consecrator of Justino Antolínez Burgos, Bishop of Tortosa (1627).

== External links and additional sources ==
- Cheney, David M. "Archdiocese of Siracusa". Catholic-Hierarchy.org. (for Chronology of Bishops) ^{[self-published]}
- Chow, Gabriel. "Archdiocese of Siracusa (Italy)". GCatholic.org. (for Chronology of Bishops) ^{[self-published]}
- Cheney, David M. "Metropolitan Archdiocese of Oviedo". Catholic-Hierarchy.org. (for Chronology of Bishops) ^{[self-published]}
- Chow, Gabriel. "Archdiocese of Oviedo (Spain)". GCatholic.org. (for Chronology of Bishops) ^{[self-published]}
- Cheney, David M. "Archdiocese of Catania". Catholic-Hierarchy.org. (for Chronology of Bishops) ^{[self-published]}
- Chow, Gabriel. "Metropolitan Archdiocese of Catania (Italy)". GCatholic.org. (for Chronology of Bishops) ^{[self-published]}
- Cheney, David M. "Archdiocese of Valladolid". Catholic-Hierarchy.org. (for Chronology of Bishops) ^{[self-published]}
- Chow, Gabriel. "Metropolitan Archdiocese of Valladolid (Spain)". GCatholic.org. (for Chronology of Bishops) ^{[self-published]}

Catholic Church titles
Preceded by Giuseppe Saladino	Bishop of Siracusa; 1613–1619	Succeeded by Paolo Faraone
Preceded by Bonaventura Secusio	Bishop of Catania; 1619–1624	Succeeded by Innocenzo Massimo
Preceded by Alsono Martín de Zuñiga	Bishop of Oviedo; 1624–1627	Succeeded by Juan Pereda Gudiel
Preceded by Alfonso López Gallo	Bishop of Valladolid; 1627–1632	Succeeded by Gregorio Pedrosa Cásares
