= Santa Lucia, Aci Catena =

Church in Aci Catena, Italy

Coordinates: 37.60656°N 15.14227°E

Santa Lucia is a Roman Catholic parish church located in Aci Catena in the region of Sicily, Italy.

== History and description ==
A church at the site is documented in 1296, when King Frederick III of Sicily visited the Sanctuary of the Madonna di Valverde. The parish here putatively served the local shoemakers. The next notices we have are from 1570-1580, when the church is known to perform baptisms. There is a documented is a pastoral visit by the vicar of the diocese of Catania in 1634, who noted the church had diverse altars. The church was in process of refurbishment when it was gravely damaged by the 1693 earthquake, prompting reconstruction in the present form. In 1730, the church was made collegiate, but it no longer functions as thus.

The entrance has a large polygonal staircase with 23 steps made with black lava stone. The facade portal has a rich baroque sculptural decoration; the bronze doors have a modern bas-relief. The belltower was added in the 19th century. The interior has a nave roof with wooden painted panels (1757) by Antonio Emanuele. The elaborate side altars and stuccoed columns were sculpted and decorated by Pietro D’Urso. Above the lateral doors are frescoed lunettes (1763) by Giambattista Piparo. Other frescoes depict Some of the frescoes in the Chapel of the Crucifix are painted by Pietro Paolo Vasta, depicting the Last Supper, the paintings of the Immaculate Conception with Saints Anne and Joachim and the Trinity with St Michael the Archangel. The depict the themes of the Old Testament alliance (Moses and the Tablets) and the New Testament alliance (Last Supper). Alessandro Vasta, Pietro Paolo's son, painted King David and his Harp and King Solomon and the Temple of Jerusalem.
