= Salvatore Pappalardo (archbishop of Siracusa) =

Italian archbishop

His Excellency The Most Reverend Salvatore Pappalardo
- Archbishop emeritus of Siracusa
- Church: Roman Catholic Church
- Archdiocese: Roman Catholic Archdiocese of Siracusa
- Metropolis: Siracusa
- See: Siracusa
- Appointed: 12 September 2008
- Installed: 8 November 2008
- Term ended: 20 October 2020
- Predecessor: Giuseppe Costanzo
- Successor: Francesco Lomanto

Orders
- Ordination: 30 June 1968
- Consecration: 5 March 1998 by Luigi Bommarito
- Rank: Archbishop

Personal details
- Born: 18 March 1945 (age 81) Nicolosi, Sicily, Italy
- Education: Pontifical Lateran University
- Motto: Latin: Servus per Iesum
- Coat of arms

Salvatore Pappalardo (born 18 March 1945) is an Italian prelate of the Catholic Church who was Archbishop of Siracusa from 2008 to 2020. Before that, he was Bishop of Nicosia for ten years.

== Biography ==
Salvatore Pappalardo was born in Nicolosi on 18 March 1945. He was ordained a priest on 30 June 1968. He studied at the seminary in Catania and then obtained a licentiate in theology and a doctorate in canon law at the Pontifical Lateran University.

In the Archdiocese of Catania he was a religion teacher in state schools, head of the diocesan Catechetical Office, vice rector of the seminary, and a parish priest. He became chancellor of the archdiocese and was Vicar General from 1989 to 1998.

Pope John Paul II named him Bishop of Nicosia on 5 February 1998. He received his episcopal consecration on 5 March 1998 in the Cathedral Basilica of Catania and was installed on 25 March 1998.

On 12 September 2008, Pope Benedict XVI appointed him Archbishop of Siracusa and he was installed there on 8 November.

Pope Francis accepted his resignation on 24 July 2020.
