= Giuseppe Costanzo =

Italian Roman Catholic bishop (1933–2025)

His Excellency Giuseppe Costanzo
- Archbishop Emeritus of Siracusa
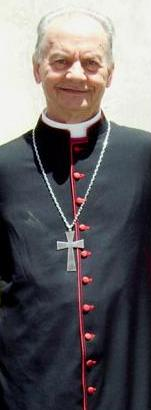
- Archdiocese: Siracusa
- Appointed: 7 December 1989
- Term ended: 12 September 2008
- Predecessor: Calogero Lauricella
- Successor: Salvatore Pappalardo
- Previous posts: Auxiliary Bishop of Acireale and Titular Bishop of Mazaca (1976–1982); Official of the Roman Curia (1979–1982); Bishop of Nola (1982–1989)

Orders
- Ordination: 15 August 1955
- Consecration: 4 April 1976 by Salvatore Pappalardo, Pasquale Bacile and Domenico Picchinenna

Personal details
- Born: 2 January 1933 Carruba di Riposto, Italy
- Died: 2 September 2025 (aged 92) Syracuse, Italy
- Buried: Cathedral of Syracuse
- Motto: Enarrare mirabilia Dei
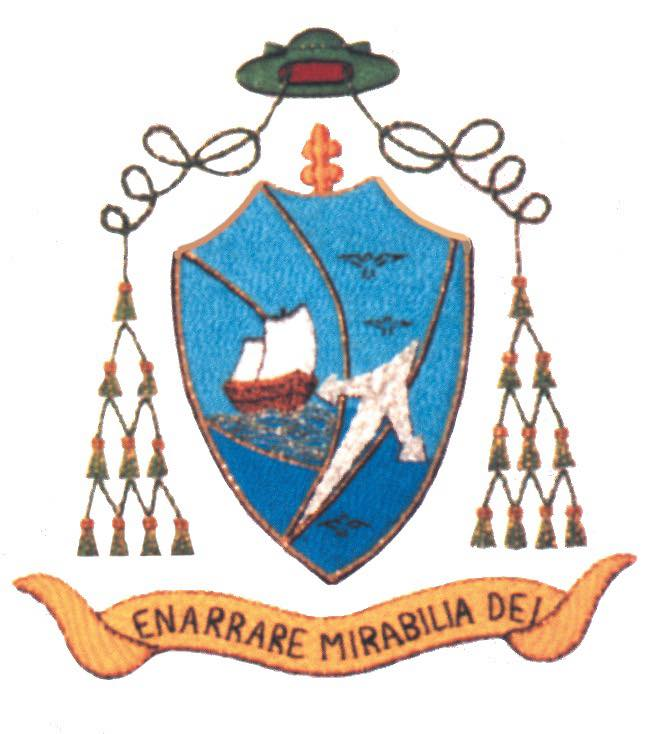
- Coat of arms

Styles of Giuseppe Costanzo
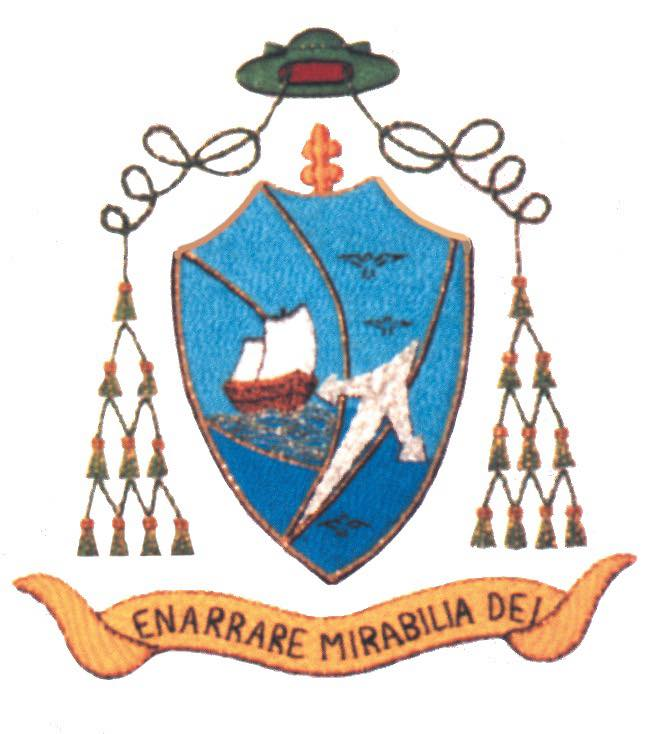
- Reference style: His Excellency; The Most Reverend
- Spoken style: Your Excellency
- Religious style: Archbishop

Giuseppe Costanzo (2 January 1933 – 2 September 2025) was an Italian Roman Catholic archbishop from 1989 to 2008 metropolitan archbishop of Syracuse.

== Biography ==
Costanzo was born in Carruba di Riposto (diocese of Acireale) on 2 January 1933. He was ordained a priest on the day of the Solemnity of the Assumption of Mary on 15 August 1955. He was a professor of exegesis and biblical languages and rector of the episcopal seminary of Acireale.

On 21 February 1976 Pope Paul VI appointed him auxiliary bishop of Acireale, assigning him the titular see of Mazaca. He received episcopal consecration on the following 4 April by the laying on of hands by Cardinal Salvatore Pappalardo. From 22 January 1979 to 6 August 1982 he was general ecclesiastical assistant of Italian Catholic Action.

On 6 August 1982 Pope John Paul II appointed him bishop of Nola. On 7 December 1989, the pope promoted him metropolitan archbishop of Syracuse. He was vice-president of the Italian Episcopal Conference and vice-president of the National Convention of the Churches of Italy in Palermo. At his behest, the construction of the basilica sanctuary of Our Lady of Tears, consecrated by Pope John Paul II on 6 November 1994, was completed. For the 50th anniversary of Our Lady's tears, he proclaimed a Marian year for the archdiocese.

In 2004 he proclaimed a Lucian year on the occasion of the 1700th anniversary of the martyrdom of Saint Lucy and asked and obtained from Cardinal Angelo Scola, patriarch of Venice, the concession of the body of Saint Lucia for the solemn celebrations of December.

In 2005, on the occasion of his 50th priestly jubilee, he proclaimed a vocational year together with the Eucharistic year. Also on the occasion of his jubilee, on 1 September, on the occasion of the celebrations of Our Lady of Tears, the mayor of Syracuse, Giambattista Bufardeci, conferred on him honorary citizenship of the city.

He was vice-president of the Sicilian Bishops' Conference until 30 January 2008, when, during the winter session of the Sicilian Bishops' Conference, Salvatore Gristina, metropolitan archbishop of Catania, was appointed as his successor.

On 12 September 2008, Pope Benedict XVI accepted his resignation, presented upon reaching the age limit according to the norms of the Code of Canon Law at the age of 75, and became archbishop emeritus of Syracuse. The following 8 November he welcomed his successor, Salvatore Pappalardo, giving him the reliquary of Our Lady of Tears, of which the archbishop is the custodian.

Costanzo died in Syracuse on 2 September 2025, at the age of 92.

Catholic Church titles
Preceded by Calogero Lauricella	Archbishop of Siracusa; 1989–2008	Succeeded by Salvatore Pappalardo
Preceded by Guerino Luigi Grimaldi	Bishop of Nola; 1982–1989	Succeeded by Umberto Tramma
Preceded by Renato Spallanzani	Titular Bishop of Mazaca; 1976–1982	Succeeded by Domenico Padovano
Preceded by —	Auxiliary Bishop of Acireale; 1976–1982	Succeeded by —
