= Gregory Asbestas =

9th century Eastern Orthodox Archbishop of Syracuse and Metropolitan of Nicaea

Gregory Asbestas (Greek: Γρηγόριος Ἀσβεστᾶς, fl. 844–880) was an influential bishop from Syracuse, who served thrice as Archbishop of Syracuse (844 – ca. 852/3, 858–867, and 877–878/9) and later (879–880) as metropolitan bishop of Nicaea. A protégé of the Patriarch of Constantinople Methodius I, he played an important role in the church conflicts of the day, becoming one of the leading opponents of Methodius' rival and successor, Ignatius, who dethroned him. Asbestas consequently became a close ally of another opponent of Ignatius, Photius, and when Ignatius was deposed and succeeded by Photius in 858, Asbestas was reinstated and performed Photius' consecration. He was deposed again during Ignatius' second patriarchate (858–867). He wrote a Life of Methodius and, according to Ignatius' supporter Nicetas Paphlago, illustrated the acts of Constantinopolitan synode of 861 with humiliating pictures of Ignatius, but neither the Life of Methodius, nor the Acts survived.

== Sources ==
- Cutler, Anthony; Kazhdan, Alexander (1991). "Asbestas, Gregory". In Kazhdan, Alexander P. (ed.). Oxford Dictionary of Byzantium. New York and Oxford: Oxford University Press. pp. 202–203. ISBN 978-0-19-504652-6.
- Dvornik, Francis (1948). The Photian Schism. Cambridge: Cambridge University Press. pp. 16–36, 48–52.
- Winkelmann, Friedhelm; Lilie, Ralph-Johannes; Ludwig, Claudia; Pratsch, Thomas; Rochow, Ilse (2000). "Gregorios Asbestas (#2480)". Prosopographie der mittelbyzantinischen Zeit: I. Abteilung (641–867), 2. Band: Georgios (#2183) – Leon (#4270) (in German). Berlin and New York: Walter de Gruyter. pp. 87–94. ISBN 9783110166729.
