= Renato Riggio =

Argentine footballer

Personal information
- Full name: Renato Enrique Riggio
- Date of birth: 14 April 1978 (age 48)
- Place of birth: Salta, Argentina
- Height: 1.74 m (5 ft 9 in)
- Position: Midfielder

Senior career*
Years	Team	Apps	(Gls)
1997–2000	Gimnasia y Tiro	40	(3)
2000	Banfield	0	(0)
2001	Unión Española	8	(0)
2002–2003	Juventud Antoniana	29	(1)
2003–2004	Instituto	28	(11)
2004–2005	Independiente	16	(1)
2005	Olimpo	6	(0)
2006	San Martín SJ	12	(1)
2007	Central Norte	12	(3)
2007	Instituto	9	(0)
2008	Jorge Wilstermann	18	(1)
2009–2010	Gimnasia y Tiro	29	(1)
2011	Alumni	24	(3)
- * Club domestic league appearances and goals

Renato Enrique Riggio (born April 14, 1978, in Salta, Argentina) is an Argentine former footballer who played as a midfielder. He then became a football coach.
