= Metropolis of Nicaea =

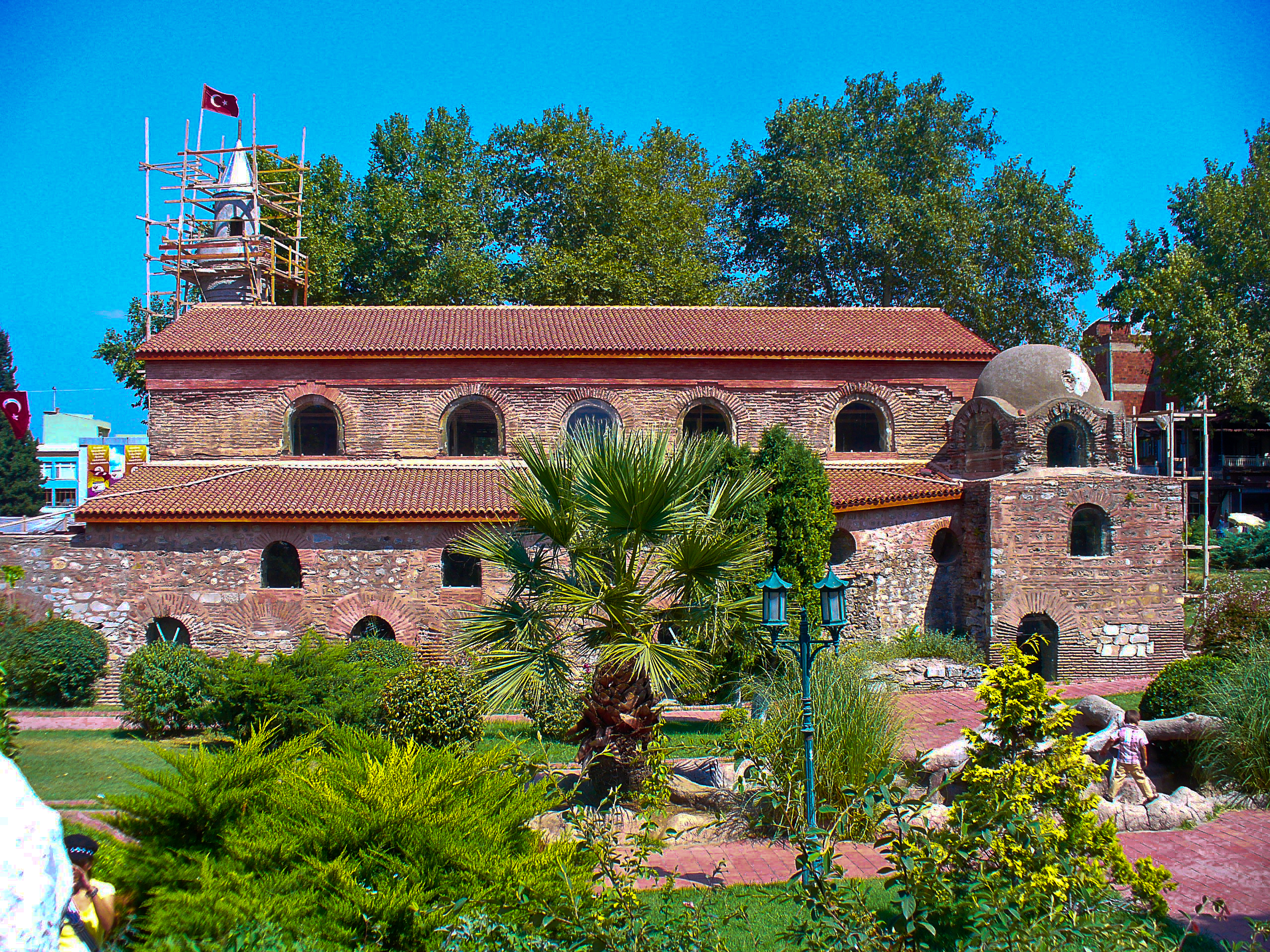
Ayasofya Iznik 903

The Metropolis of Nicaea (Greek: Μητρόπολις Νικαίας), was an ecclesiastical province (since the mid-4th century a metropolitan bishopric) of the Patriarchate of Constantinople in the city of Nicaea in the province of Bithynia (now Iznik in Turkey). A prestigious see due to its proximity to the Byzantine capital, Constantinople, and the location of two Ecumenical Councils in 325 and 787, the metropolitan see of Nicaea remained important until its conquest by the Ottoman Turks in 1331. The Christian element in the diocese diminished rapidly after that, with the flight of the Greek population and the Islamization of the remainder. As a result, the seat of the diocese was moved to Cius. The metropolis remained active until the population exchange between Greece and Turkey in the early 1920s. It remains a titular see of the Patriarchate of Constantinople as well as being, since the mid-15th century, a titular archbishopric of the Roman Catholic Church.

== History ==
Nicaea was an important and prosperous city in Late Antiquity, and its local church flourished as a result. The First Ecumenical Council was held in the city in 325, and under Emperor Valens (r. 364–378), the local see was removed from the purview of its neighbour and rival, Nicomedia, and raised to the status of a separate metropolis. In the fifth century it took three suffragans from the jurisdiction of Nicomedia, and later six. In 787 a second Ecumenical Council (the Seventh) was held there, ending the first period of Byzantine Iconoclasm. In the Notitiae Episcopatuum from the 8th to the 15th centuries, Nicaea steadily occupies the eighth place in the metropolitan sees subject to the Patriarchate of Constantinople.

The city remained important throughout the middle Byzantine period (7th–12th centuries). Following the rebellion of Nikephoros Melissenos, his Turkish allies captured the city in 1081, and it became the first capital of the Seljuk Turkish Sultanate of Rum until its recapture by the First Crusade in 1097. After the capture of Constantinople and the establishment of the Latin Empire by the Fourth Crusade (1204), the city became the capital of the Empire of Nicaea, and the seat of the Patriarchate of Constantinople in exile until the recapture of Constantinople in 1261. Among the 46 bishops recorded by Le Quien (Oriens Christianus, Vol. I, 639–56), the most notable are: Theognis, the first known bishop, excommunicated in 325; Anastasius in the 6th century; Peter, Theophanes the Branded, Ignatios the Deacon and Gregory Asbestas in the 9th century; Eustratius in the early 12th century; and Basilios Bessarion in the 15th century.

The city was captured, after a long siege, by the Ottoman Turks in 1331. The long resistance of the city, as well as the exodus of its Greek Orthodox population to still Byzantine-controlled lands and the rapid Islamization that followed the conquest (the phenomenon of crypto-Christianity notwithstanding) quickly diminished the Greek Orthodox element in the population. Already in 1354, when Gregory Palamas visited the city, he found the local Christian population much depleted, and in a partial census of Nicaea itself dating to 1454/5, only seven Christian households are recorded. Although the entire region of Bithynia suffered a sharp decline in the numbers of its Christian element during and after the Ottoman conquest, throughout the early Ottoman period the Patriarchate retained active all of its Byzantine-era metropolises—apart from Nicaea also Nicomedia, Chalcedon and Prussa—a number totally disproportionate to the demographic realities on the ground. Apart from the desire to maintain in existence historical and prestigious sees like Nicaea, this practice was most likely the result of their proximity to the seat of the Patriarchate in Constantinople, which allowed their bishops to both administer their dioceses and play an active role in the central administration of the Church. This practice became formalized in the 18th century, when the bishops of the dioceses closest to Constantinople (i.e. Bithynia and Eastern Thrace), who typically resided in the Ottoman capital and were members of the patriarchate's permanent synod, were elevated to "Elder" (γέροντες) metropolitans and formed a group with the power to check and counsel the Patriarchs.

Greek Orthodox metropolises in Asia Minor, ca. 1880.

Nevertheless, as a result of the scarcity of the Christian element in Nicaea itself the seat of the metropolis was moved to the nearby port of Cius, whose local archbishopric was consequently abolished. The date of the transfer is unknown, but may have been as early as the late 14th century. The local church of the Dormition (or Theotokos Pazariotissa, as it was known) served as the cathedral of the metropolis at least since its renovation in 1692.

The metropolis experienced a revival in late Ottoman times, as a result of the general demographic upswing of the Orthodox (not just Greek) population in this period. By the early 20th century, it encompassed 26 parishes, including Greek-speaking, Armenian-speaking and Turkish-speaking Christians. According to the (not always reliable) pre-World War I census of the Patriarchate, the metropolis encompassed 33,470 people.

== Sources ==
- Darrouzès, Jean, ed. (1981). Notitiae Episcopatuum Ecclesiae Constantinopolitanae. Paris: Institut français d'études byzantines.
- Foss, Clive (1991). "Nicaea". In Kazhdan, Alexander (ed.). The Oxford Dictionary of Byzantium. Oxford and New York: Oxford University Press. pp. 1463–1464. ISBN 0-19-504652-8.
- Komatina, Predrag (2014). "Settlement of the Slavs in Asia Minor During the Rule of Justinian II and the Bishopric των Γορδοσερβων" (PDF). Београдски историјски гласник: Belgrade Historical Review. 5: 33–42.
- Moustakas, Konstantinos (2003). "Νικαίας Μητρόπολις (Οθωμανική Περίοδος)". Encyclopaedia of the Hellenic World, Asia Minor (in Greek). Foundation of the Hellenic World.
- Nesbitt, John; Oikonomides, Nicolas, eds. (1996). Catalogue of Byzantine Seals at Dumbarton Oaks and in the Fogg Museum of Art, Volume 3: West, Northwest, and Central Asia Minor and the Orient. Washington, DC: Dumbarton Oaks Research Library and Collection. ISBN 0-88402-250-1.
