= Diocese of Nicosia, Sicily =

Roman Catholic diocese in Italy

Coordinates: 37.7500°N 14.4000°E

Diocese of Nicosia Dioecesis Nicosiensis o Herbitensis

Catholic
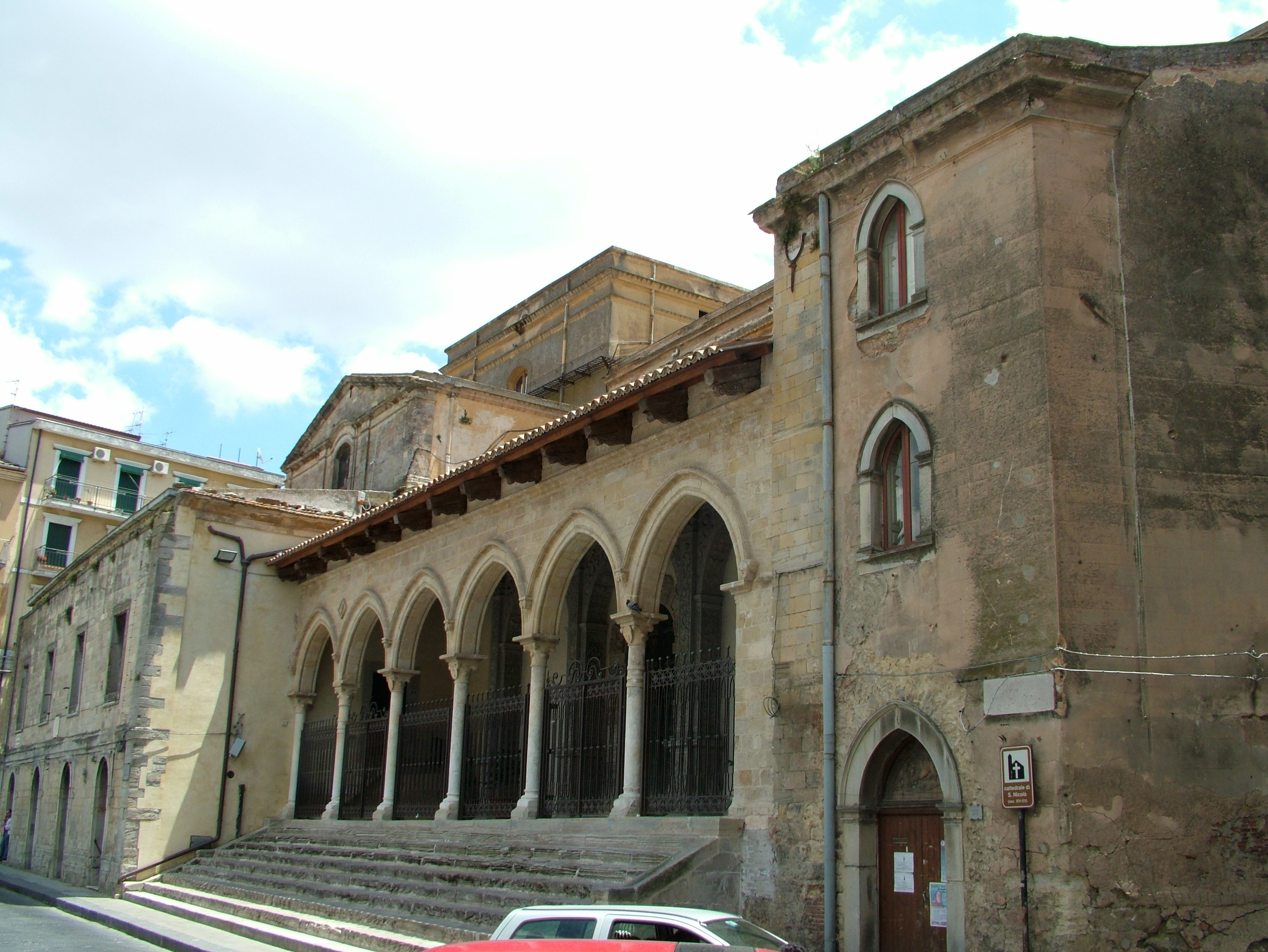
- Nicosia Cathedral

Location
- Country: Italy
- Ecclesiastical province: Messina-Lipari-Santa Lucia del Mela

Statistics
- Area: 1,475 km^{2} (570 sq mi)
- Population: Total; Catholics: (as of 2023); 71,610 ▼; 70,610 (est.) ▼
- Parishes: 40

Information
- Denomination: Catholic Church
- Rite: Roman Rite
- Established: 17 March 1817 (209 years ago)
- Cathedral: Basilica Cattedrale di S. Nicola di Bari
- Secular priests: 35 (diocesan) ▼4 (Religious Orders) ▼10 Permanent Deacons ▲

Current leadership
- Pope: Leo XIV
- Bishop: Giuseppe Schillaci
- Bishops emeritus: Salvatore Muratore

Map
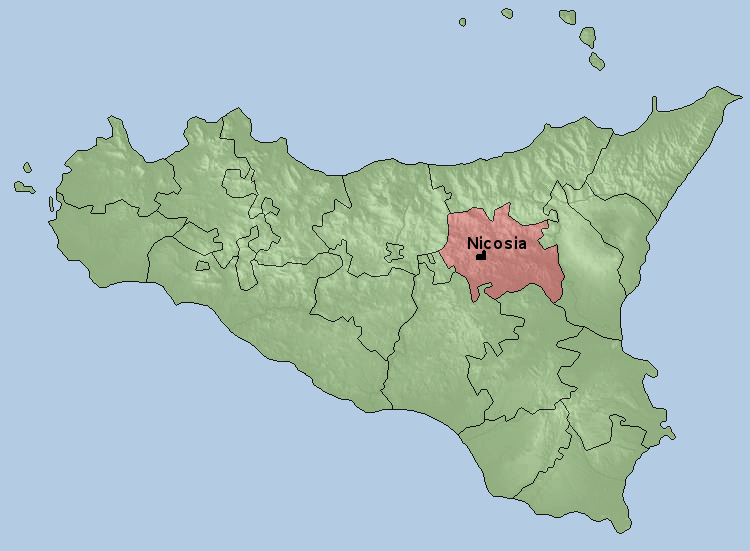

Website
- www.diocesinicosia.it

The Diocese of Nicosia (Latin: Dioecesis Nicosiensis seu Herbitensis) is a Latin diocese of the Catholic Church in Sicily. It is a suffragan of the Archdiocese of Messina-Lipari-Santa Lucia del Mela. The city of Nicosia is c. 80 km directly west of Mount Etna.

== History ==
Nicosia had been placed under the patronage of S. Nicholas of Myra by Pope Benedict XIV. The Collegiate Church of S. Nicolas in Nicosia had a Chapter composed of 43 individuals, headed by three dignities: the Archpriest, the Cantor, and the Treasurer, and ten canons. The church was also a parish church. Another church in the city, Santa Maria Maggiore, was named a collegiate church by Pope Urban VIII in 1625. Its college was composed of three dignities (the Dean, the Archpriest, and the Primicerius) and ten canons-in-ordinary with two honorary canons.

As early as 1815, King Ferdinand I of the Two Sicilies had written to the pope, pointing out that the island of Sicily had only nine bishops, and that the extent of these dioceses was too extensive for the bishops to oversee them adequately. The population of the island exceeded 1.5 million, and the diocese of Messina alone had 130,000. The pope consulted with the apostolic delegate the archbishop of Palermo and members of the College of Cardinals in the Consistorial Congregation.

=== Erection of the diocese ===
Finally, on 17 March 1817, Pope Pius VII issued the bull "Superaddita Diei", establishing the diocese of Nicosia (Herbitensis). The moment was opportune, since the archbishop of Messina, Gaetano Maria Garrasi, had died on 16 February 1817. To form the territory of the new diocese, the pope detached from the archdiocese of Messina the communes of: Alimena, Buompietro, Castelbuono, Gangi, Geraci, Petralia Soprana, Petralia, Sottana, Bronte, Maletto, Capizzi, Cesarò, S. Mauro, and S. Teodoro; plus two small country districts called Casale Marianopolis and Bon-Pietro.

Within the diocese is the ancient city of Troina, which was briefly an episcopal see from 1087 to 1090.

==== Chapter and cathedral ====
The Collegiate Church of S. Nicholas had its privileges and prerogatives revoked, and it was reduced to the status of a parish church. Similarly, the Chapter of the collegiate church had its privileges and powers revoked and was suppressed. The pope then elevated S. Nicholas to the status of a cathedral church and assigned it as the seat of the new bishop of Nicosia. The bishop was made a suffragan of the archbishop of Messina. A cathedral Chapter was created to administer and provide liturgical services for the cathedral, consisting of five dignities (the Archpriest, the Archdeacon, the Cantor, the Deacon, and the Treasurer) and ten canons, along with ten "mansionarii" (canonicatus secundarios). The archpriest was to serve as the parish priest.

On the 150th anniversary of its founding as a cathedral, the cathedral of S. Nicholas of Bari in Nicosia was granted the title and privileges of a minor basilica.

==== Seminary ====
In the bull of 1817 establishing the diocese, Pope Pius VII also mandated that a seminary for priests also be established. It was not until 1845, however, that Bishop Benza (1844–1847) was able to found the seminary, in a rented house; his expected financial support did not materialize, and he was forced to close it. Bishop Milana reopened the seminary, and began building permanent premises, which were not completed until the early 1860s, by Bishop Lo Piccolo (1858–1881). In 1867, it was closed, and the building confiscated by the government. In 1882, it reopened, in quarters provided by the municipal authorities in the former Carmelite convent. In 1889, the seminary moved to the former monastery of San Biagio. In 1961, the seminary was moved again, to a new building in as suburb, three km. from the center of Nicosia.

Pius VII had also noted in the bull of 1817 that there was a seminary for youth (high school), located at Bronte, which was subsequently detached from the diocese of Nicosia and transferred to the diocese of Catania.

=== Development ===
The first bishop of Nicosia was Gaetano Maria Avarna, the Vicar-general and Auxiliary Bishop of Messina, transferred from the titular bishopric of Zama by Pope Pius VII, on 26 June 1818.

The construction of an orphanage in Nicosia was begun c. 1800, on the initiative of the archbishop of Messina, with the backing of the king. The building was completed in 1811. The institution was administered by the archpriest of the cathedral Chapter, a civil syndic, and the director of the Monte di Pietà. The Monte di Pietà had been established in the mid-16th century by the Confraternità della Misericordia as a bank for loans to the poor.

The Jesuits established a mission in Nicosia at the church of Santa Maria Deiparae in 1807.

In 1819, the Collegiate Church of S. Maria Maggiore in Nicosia was raised to the rank and title of a minor basilica.

Bishop Bernardo Cozzuoli (1881–1902) presided over the first diocesan synod, which was held from 6–9 September 1883. He held a second synod on 14–16 November 1893.

== Bishops ==
- Gaetano Maria Avarna (1818–1841)

Sede vacante (1841–1844)

- Rosario Vincenzo Benza (1844–1847)
- Camillo Milana (1851–1858)
- Melchiorre Lo Piccolo (1858–1881)
- Bernardo Cozzucli (Cozzuoli) (1881–1902)
- Ferdinando Fiandaca (1903–1912)
- Felice Agostino Addeo, O.S.A. (1913–1942 Resigned)
- Pio Giardina (1942–1953 Died)
- Clemente Gaddi (1953–1962 Appointed, Coadjutor Archbishop of Siracusa)
- Costantino Trapani, O.F.M. (1962–1976)
- Salvatore Di Salvo (1976–1984 Resigned)

Pio Vittorio Vigo (1984–1985), Apostolic Administrator

- Pio Vittorio Vigo (1985–1997 Appointed, Archbishop of Monreale)
- Salvatore Pappalardo (1998–2008)
- Salvatore Muratore (2009–2022)
- Giuseppe Schillaci (2022–present)

== Bibliography ==
- Beritelli e la Vita, Giuseppe; Alessio Narbone (1852) Notizie storiche di Nicosia (in Italian). Palermo: Giuseppe Perdone 1852.
- Cappelletti, Giuseppe (1870). Le chiese d'Italia dalla loro origine sino ai nostri giorni (in Italian). Vol. vigesimoprimo (21). Venezia: Antonelli. pp. 579–581.
- D'Avino, Vincenzio (1848). Cenni storici sulle chiese arcivescovili, vescovili, e prelatizie (nullius) del regno delle due Sicilie (in Italian). Naples: dalle stampe di Ranucci. p. 472.
- Ritzler, Remigius; Sefrin, Pirminus (1968). Hierarchia Catholica medii et recentioris aevi (in Latin). Vol. 7 (1800–1846). Monasterii: Libr. Regensburgiana.
- Ritzler, Remigius; Sefrin, Pirminus (1978). Hierarchia catholica Medii et recentioris aevi (in Latin). Vol. 8 (1846–1903). Il Messaggero di S. Antonio.
- Pięta, Zenon (2002). Hierarchia catholica medii et recentioris aevi (in Latin). Vol. 9 (1903–1922). Padua: Messagero di San Antonio. ISBN 978-88-250-1000-8.
- Pius VII, "Superaddita Diei"", 17 March 1817, in: Bullarii Romani continuatio (in Latin), Vol. 7 (Romae: Typographia Reverendae Camerae Apostolicae 1852), pp. 1428-1442.
- Savagnone, F. Guglielmo (1912). "Concili e sinodi di Sicilia," (in Italian), in: Atti della reale Accademia di scienze, lettere e belle arti di Palermo terza serie, Vol. 9. Palermo: Impresa generale d'Affissione e Publicità, 1912. pp. 3-212 + Appendice.
