= Palazzo Riggio, Aci Catena =

Palace in Aci Catena, Sicily, Italy

Coordinates: 37°N 15°E

The Palazzo Riggio is a Baroque aristocratic palace in central Aci Catena, region of Sicily, Italy. It is adjacent to the church of the Santa Maria della Catena.

The palace was commissioned in the 1670s by Stefano Riggio, Prince of Campofranco and Campoflorido, who was sent to Catania to serve as viceroy after the eruption of Etna of 1669. Settling in the province, he purchased this locale and the towns of Aci Sant'Antonio and Aci San Filippo for 36,500 scudi. The land had previously belonged to the Diana family. The interior is notable for the sculpted portal and private chapel.
