= Archdiocese of Syracuse =

Latin Catholic archdiocese in Italy

Coordinates: 37.0833°N 15.2833°E

Archdiocese of Siracusa Archidioecesis Syracusana

Catholic
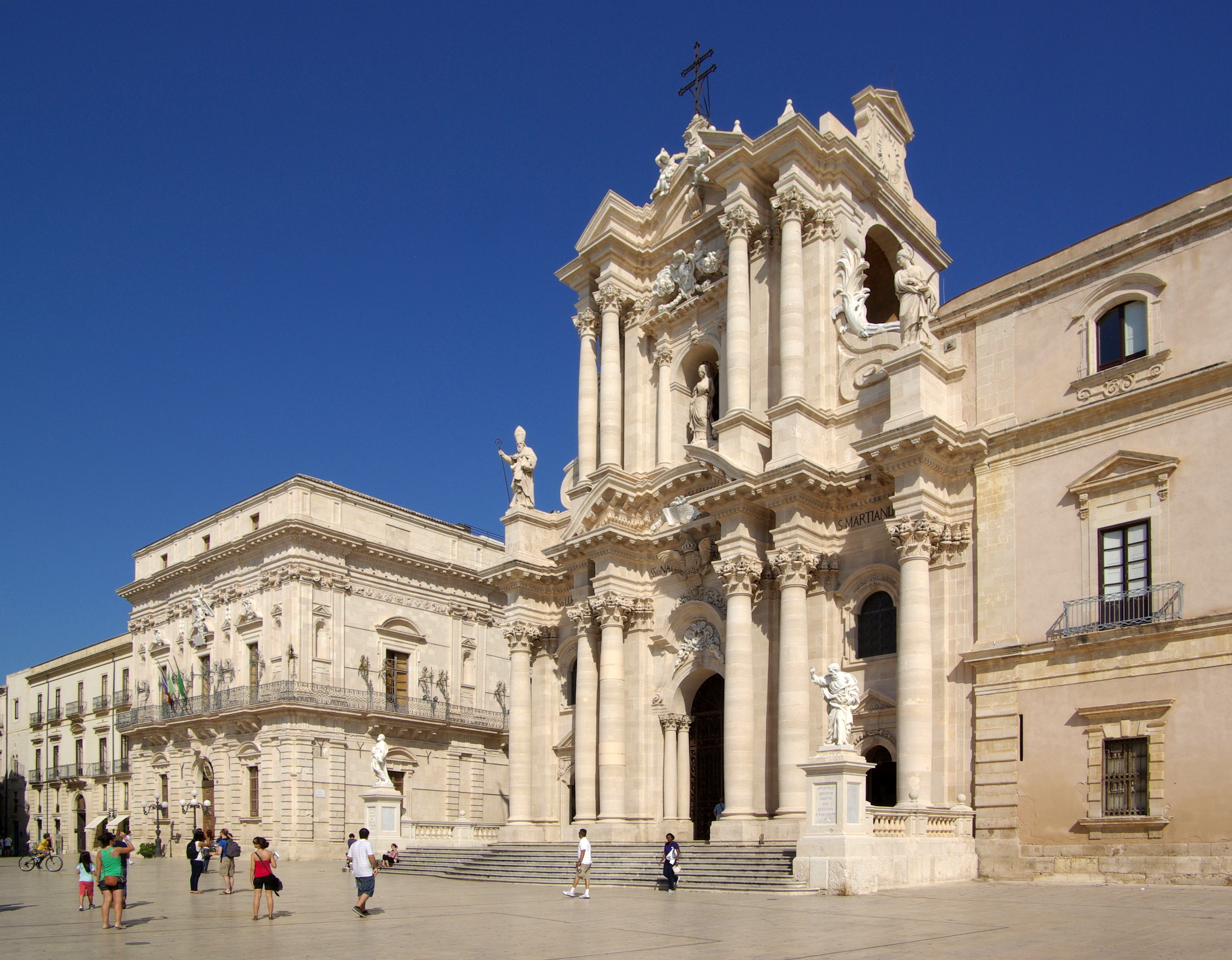
- Cathedral of Syracuse

Location
- Country: Italy
- Ecclesiastical province: Siracusa

Statistics
- Area: 1,341 km^{2} (518 sq mi)
- Population: Total; Catholics: (as of 2023); 294,901 (est.) ▼; 285,000 (est.) ▼
- Parishes: 76

Information
- Denomination: Catholic Church
- Sui iuris church: Latin Church
- Rite: Roman Rite
- Established: 2nd century
- Cathedral: Cattedrale della Natività di Maria Santissima
- Secular priests: 104 (diocesan); 30 (Religious Orders) ▼56 Deacons ▲

Current leadership
- Pope: Leo XIV
- Archbishop: Francesco Lomanto
- Bishops emeritus: Salvatore Pappalardo

Map
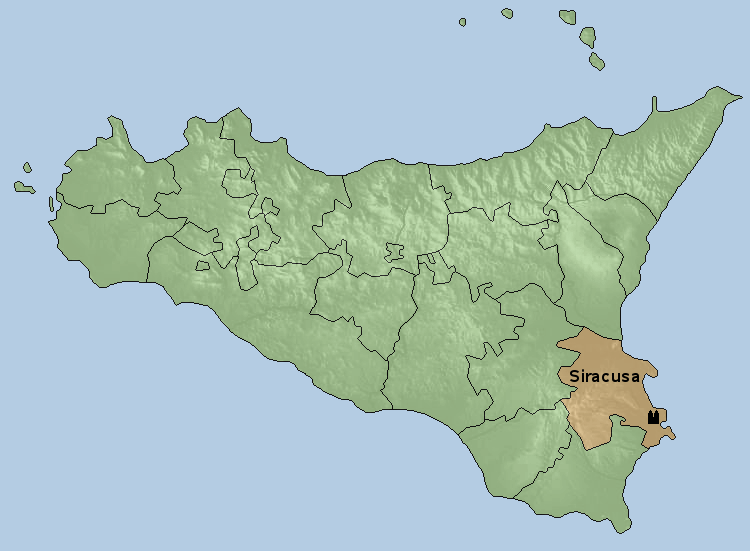

Website
- Website of the Archdiocese, arcidiocesi.siracusa.it. Accessed 27 February 2024.

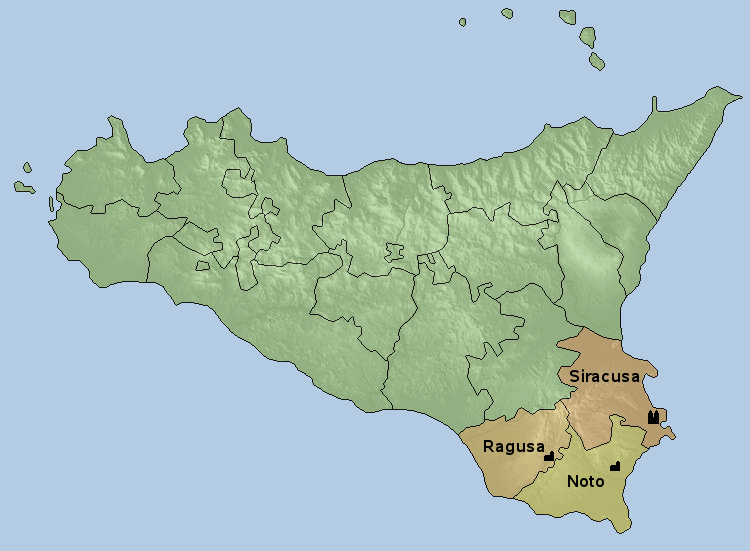
Map of the ecclesiastical province of Siracusa

The Archdiocese of Siracusa or Syracuse (Latin: Archidioecesis Syracusana) is a Latin Church ecclesiastical territory or diocese of the Catholic Church in Sicily. It became an archdiocese in 1844. The current archbishop is Francesco Lomanto.

== History ==
Syracuse claimed to be the second Church founded by St. Peter, after that of Antioch. It also claims that St. Paul preached there. As its first bishop it venerates St. Marcianus, whose dates are uncertain, though some claim he was ordained by St. Peter himself. Little trust can be placed in the authenticity of the list of the seventeen bishops who were predecessors of Chrestus, to whom the Emperor Constantine wrote a letter.

In the times of St. Cyprian (mid-3rd century), Christianity certainly flourished at Syracuse, and the catacombs located there attest to Christian worship there in the 2nd century. Besides its martyred bishops, Syracuse claims other Christian martyrs, such as Saints Benignus and Evagrius (204), St. Bassianus (270); and the martyrdom of the deacon Euplus and the virgin St. Lucy under Diocletian are thought to be historical.

The names of the known bishops of the following century are few in number: Germanus (346); Eulalius (465); Agatho (553), during whose rule Pope Vigilius died at Syracuse; another bishop was denounced by Pope Honorius for the protection which he accorded to prostitutes; St. Zozimus (640), who founded the monastery of Santa Lucia fuori-le-mura; St. Elias (d. 660).

Of Marcianos II, it is said that he was consecrated not at Rome, but at Syracuse, since the Emperor Leo the Isaurian (726) had removed Southern Italy from the jurisdiction of Rome, and had then elevated Syracuse to the dignity of a metropolitan see, over the thirteen other dioceses of Sicily. Bishop Stephen II (c. 768–787) was present at the Second Council of Nicaea, and carried to Constantinople the relics of St. Lucy for safety against the Saracen incursions.

Archbishop Gregorios Asbestas was deposed by Ignatius, who had become Patriarch of Constantinople in 847, though Ignatius' election and then his act of deposition of Gregory were condemned by Pope Leo IV. Gregory and two other bishops had appealed to Rome, and Pope Leo insisted that no bishop should be deposed without the consent of Rome. Gregory then became the principal supporter of Patriarch St. Photius, and actually carried out his consecration in 857. He lost his See when Syracuse fell to the Arabs.

After Syracuse fell to the Arabs in 878, Bishop Sophronius was thrown into prison at Palermo together with the monk Theodosius, where he died in a dungeon. Until the Norman Conquest in the eleventh century the names of other bishops are not known. The series of bishops begins again in 1093 with Bishop Rogerius, who received the pallium from Pope Urban II.

On 19 October 1188, Pope Celestine III wrote to the Archbishop of Monreale, Guglielmo, finally settling the dissention between Siracusa and Monreale over the right to metropolitan status, which had turned into a scandal. The Pope decided that the pallium, which the Archbishops of Siracusa had been accustomed to wear through the indulgence of the Holy See, should not be used by the bishop of Syracuse and his successors. The diocese of Siracusa became suffragan of the archdiocese of Monreale.

Among the bishops of this period were:

- Pietro de Urries (1516), ambassador of Emperor Charles V to the Fifth Lateran Council;
- Jacopo Orozco (1562), who introduced the Roman ritual in place of the Gallican, and who founded the seminary.

Discussions about the small number of bishops on the island of Sicily and the large numbers of Catholics in their dioceses began as early as 1778 in the General Parliament of Sicily. On 5 April 1778, they petitioned King Ferdinand to have the number of dioceses increased to solve the problem, and he graciously agreed to their supplication. In 1802, when the Bishop of Syracuse died, the town Council of Caltagirone petitioned the King again, and in the bull of appointment of the new bishop Pope Pius VII reserved the right to divide the diocese at the appropriate moment. In 1806, the Pope and the Consistorial Congregation assigned the Archbishop of Palermo the task of carrying out the negotiations which would lead to a reordering of the dioceses of Sicily. A new bishop of Siracusa, Filippo Trigona, was appointed in 1807, and both he and the town council of Siracusa were opposed to the plan to diminish the size of the diocese. On 12 September 1816, however, Pope Pius VII proceeded to issue the instructions to detach the new diocese of Caltagirone from Syracuse, and the King followed with executorial letters on 8 April 1817. On 15 May 1844, Pope Gregory XVI created the new diocese of Noto out of territory belonging to the diocese of Siracusa, and the action was approved by King Ferdinand II of the Two Sicilies on 2 July 1844. Noto was made suffragan to the diocese of Siracusa.

On 6 May 1950, Pope Pius XII established the new diocese of Ragusa out of the territory of the Archdiocese of Siracusa, and made it suffragan to the ecclesiastical province of Siracusa. The Archbishop of Siracusa, Ettore Baranzini, was appointed to guide the formation of the new diocese, and, on 9 September 1950, the Papal Legate, Cardinal Ernesto Ruffini of Palermo, handed over the new diocese to Archbishop Baranzini. His Auxiliary Bishop, Francesco Pennisi, was appointed Vicar General of Ragusa and took up residence in the town of some 73,000. On 1 October 1955, the definitive separation of the two dioceses took effect, and Bishop Pennisi became the first bishop of Ragusa.

== Bishops ==
=== Diocese of Siracusa ===
Erected: 2nd Century
Latin Name: Syracusanus
Metropolitan: Archdiocese of Monreale

==== Before 1400 ====
...

- Chrestus (attested 314)

...

- Eulalius (attested 499/500)
- Maximianus, O.S.B. (591 – dead by Nov 594)
- Ioannes (595 – after 603)

...

- Gregory Asbestas (844 – ca. 852/3, 858–867, and 877–878/9)
- Sophronius (c. 876–878)

...

- Riccardus Palmeri (1156? – December 1182)
- Laurentius (c. 1192 – 1200/1201)
- Gottofredus (Rotofredus) (c. 1202?)
- Andreas (died 1207)
- Adam (attested 1211–1212)
- Bartolomeo (1215–1226)
- Gualterus de Palena (Bishop-Elect)
- Conradus (c. 1228) (Bishop-Elect)
- Gregorius (attested 1233–1254)
- Mathaeus de Panormo (1255–1267)
- Reynaldus de Lusio
- Simon de Leontino, O.P. (1270 – c. 1280)

...

- Domenico de Saragossa, O.P. (10 January 1304 – 8 August 1304)
- Philippus de Sanchio (1305–1312)
- Petrus de Montecateno (1313 – 4 September 1336)

...

- Thomas de Herbes, O.S.B. (18 March 1388 – 14 March 1419)

==== From 1400 to 1600 ====
- Rogerius (Bellhomo) (15 May 1419 – 22 January 1443)
- Joannes Garsias, O.P. (5 October 1444 – 3 February 1446)
- Paolo de Santafé (3 February 1446 – 4 January 1460)
- Giacopo Antonio Venier (9 January 1462 – 26 January 1463) (Bishop-elect)
- Andrea Tolomei (26 January 1463 – 1468 Died)
- Dalmazio Gabrielli (Gabriele, Grazielli), O.P. (6 September 1469 – 13 January 1511 Died)
- Guillermo Raimundo Centelles (4 June 1512 – 22 August 1516 Died)
- Pedro de Urieta (28 September 1516 – 1518 Resigned)
- Ludovico Platamone (18 February 1518 – 30 May 1540 Died)
- Girolamo Beccadelli Bologna (29 April 1541 – 16 July 1560 Died)
- Juan Orozco de Arce (6 November 1562 – 11 August 1574)
- Gilberto Isfar y Corillas (11 August 1574 – 23 January 1579)
- Juan Castellano Orozco (26 June 1579 – 12 May 1602 Died)

==== From 1600 to 1840 ====
- Giuseppe Saladino (31 May 1604 – 22 November 1611 Died)
- Juan Torres de Osorio (13 November 1613 – 19 October 1619)
- Paolo Faraone (7 October 1619 – 12 November 1629 Died)
- Fabrizio Antinori (13 November 1630 – 25 July 1635 Died)
- Francesco d'Elia e Rossi (2 May 1639 – 6 December 1647 Died)
- Giovanni Antonio Capobianco (22 March 1649 – 19 May 1673 Died)
- Francesco Maria Rini (Rhini), O.F.M. (1 October 1674 – 19 October 1676)
- Francesco Fortezza (14 December 1676 – 13 November 1693 Died)
- Asdrubale Termini (30 May 1695 – 6 June 1722 Died)
- Tomás Marín (Marino), O.P. (14 February 1724 – 2 May 1730 Died)
- Matteo Trigona (7 May 1732 Confirmed – 10 Oct 1747 Resigned)
- Francesco Maria Testa (6 May 1748 Confirmed – 22 April 1754)
- Giuseppe Antonio de Requeséns, O.S.B. (17 February 1755 Confirmed – January 1773 Died)
- Giovanni Battista Alagona (13 September 1773 Confirmed – September 1801 Died)
- Gaetano Maria Bonanno (24 May 1802 – 6 August 1806 Died)
- Filippo Trigona (18 September 1807 Confirmed – 2 January 1824 Died)
- Giuseppe-Maria Amorelli (20 December 1824 Confirmed – 13 December 1840 Died)

=== Archbishops of Siracusa ===
- Michele Manzo (21 April 1845 Confirmed – 27 September 1852)
- Angelo Robino (27 June 1853 Confirmed – 28 August 1868 Died)
- Giuseppe Guarino (23 February 1872 – 5 July 1875 Appointed, Archbishop of Messina)
- Benedetto Lavecchia Guarnieri, O.F.M. (5 July 1875 – 6 March 1896 Died)
- Giuseppe Fiorenza (22 June 1896 – 11 December 1905 Resigned)
- Luigi Bignami (11 December 1905 – 27 December 1919 Died)
- Giacomo Carabelli (13 April 1921 – 16 July 1932 Died)
- Ettore Baranzini (29 April 1933 – 6 March 1968 Died)
- Giuseppe Bonfigioli (6 March 1968 Succeeded – 17 April 1973 Appointed, Archbishop of Cagliari)
- Calogero Lauricella (8 September 1973 – 20 June 1989 Died)
- Giuseppe Costanzo (7 December 1989 – 12 September 2008 Retired)
- Salvatore Pappalardo (Note: He is not the Salvatore Pappalardo who was Archbishop of Palermo and who became a cardinal in 1973.) (12 September 2008 – 24 July 2020 Retired)
- Francesco Lomanto (24 July 2020 – present)

== See also ==
- Timeline of Syracuse, Sicily

== Books ==
=== Reference Works ===
- Eubel, Conradus, ed. (1913). Hierarchia catholica, Tomus 1 (second ed.). Münster: Libreria Regensbergiana. (in Latin)
- Eubel, Conradus, ed. (1914). Hierarchia catholica, Tomus 2 (second ed.). Münster: Libreria Regensbergiana. (in Latin)
- Eubel, Conradus, ed. (1923). Hierarchia catholica, Tomus 3 (second ed.). Münster: Libreria Regensbergiana. (in Latin)
- Gauchat, Patritius (Patrice) (1935). Hierarchia catholica IV (1592-1667). Münster: Libraria Regensbergiana. (in Latin)
- Ritzler, Remigius; Sefrin, Pirminus (1952). Hierarchia catholica medii et recentis aevi V (1667-1730). Patavii: Messagero di S. Antonio. (in Latin)
- Ritzler, Remigius; Sefrin, Pirminus (1958). Hierarchia catholica medii et recentis aevi VI (1730-1799). Patavii: Messagero di S. Antonio. (in Latin)
- Ritzler, Remigius; Sefrin, Pirminus (1968). Hierarchia Catholica medii et recentioris aevi sive summorum pontificum, S. R. E. cardinalium, ecclesiarum antistitum series... A pontificatu Pii PP. VII (1800) usque ad pontificatum Gregorii PP. XVI (1846) (in Latin). Vol. VII. Monasterii: Libr. Regensburgiana.
- Ritzler, Remigius; Pirminus Sefrin (1978). Hierarchia catholica Medii et recentioris aevi... A Pontificatu PII PP. IX (1846) usque ad Pontificatum Leonis PP. XIII (1903) (in Latin). Vol. VIII. Il Messaggero di S. Antonio.
- Pięta, Zenon (2002). Hierarchia catholica medii et recentioris aevi... A pontificatu Pii PP. X (1903) usque ad pontificatum Benedictii PP. XV (1922) (in Latin). Vol. IX. Padua: Messagero di San Antonio. ISBN 978-88-250-1000-8.

=== Studies ===
- Agnello, Nunzio (1891). Il monachismo in Siracusa: cenni storici degli ordini religiosi soppressi dalla legge 7 luglio 1866 (in Italian). Siracusa: Francesco Miuccio.
- Avino, Vincenzio d' (1848). Cenni storici sulle chiese arcivescovili, vescovili, e prelatizie (nullius) del regno delle due Sicilie (in Italian). Naples: dalle stampe di Ranucci. pp. 634–638. (article by P. Francesco Serafino)
- Avolo, Ignazio (1832). Cenni sopra l'antico metropolitano di Siracusa (in Italian). Siracusa: Giuseppe Pulejo.
- Cappelletti, Giuseppe (1870). Le chiese d'Italia dalla loro origine sino ai nostri giorni (in Italian). Vol. vigesimoprimo (21). Venezia: Antonelli.
- Lanzoni, Francesco (1927). Le diocesi d'Italia dalle origini al principio del secolo VII (an. 604) (in Italian). Rome: Biblioteca Apostolica Vaticana.
- Backman, Clifford R. (2002). The Decline and Fall of Medieval Sicily: Politics, Religion, and Economy in the Reign of Frederick III, 1296-1337. Cambridge University Press. ISBN 978-0-521-52181-9.
- Garana, Ottavio (1994). I vescovi di Siracusa (in Italian). Siracusa: Emanuele Romeo.
- Kamp, Norbert (1975). Kirche und Monarchie im staufischen Königreich Sizilien: I. Prosopographische Grundlegung, Bistumer und Bischofe des Konigreichs 1194–1266: 3. Sizilien München: Wilhelm Fink 1975
- Pirro, Rocco (1733). Mongitore, Antonino (ed.). Sicilia sacra disquisitionibus et notitiis illustrata. Vol. Tomus primus (third ed.). Palermo: haeredes P. Coppulae. pp. 598–690.
- Privatera, Serafino (1879). Storia di Siracusa antica e moderna (in Italian). Vol. I. Naples: Pignatelli.; Volume II (in Italian). 1879.
