= Lorenzo Gramiccia =

Italian painter

Lorenzo Gramiccia (?–1796) was an Italian painter, active in a late-Baroque.

The precise date of birth is not known: if the literature commonly places it in 1702, on the basis of a document from 1721, in which he is said to be seventeen, it should be slightly postponed. In the same it is deduced that at the time he lived in Rome and was a student of Bonaventura Lamberti. Since the master died in September of the same year, it was he who completed one of the four cartoons (St. Peter baptizes St. Petronilla) for the mosaics of the corners of the Chapel of the Angels and of St. Petronilla, in St. Peter's Basilica.

He was born in Cave, Lazio, near Palestrina in the Lazio, but is mainly known for his work in the north of Italy. He trained in Rome, but did not pursue Neoclassical styles of painting. He painted in Venice for the churches of Santi Giovanni e Paolo, San Simone Profeta, and in 1777 for San Giacomo dall’Orio. He painted a Roman Charity (circa 1740–1750) found at the Accademia Carrara of Bergamo.

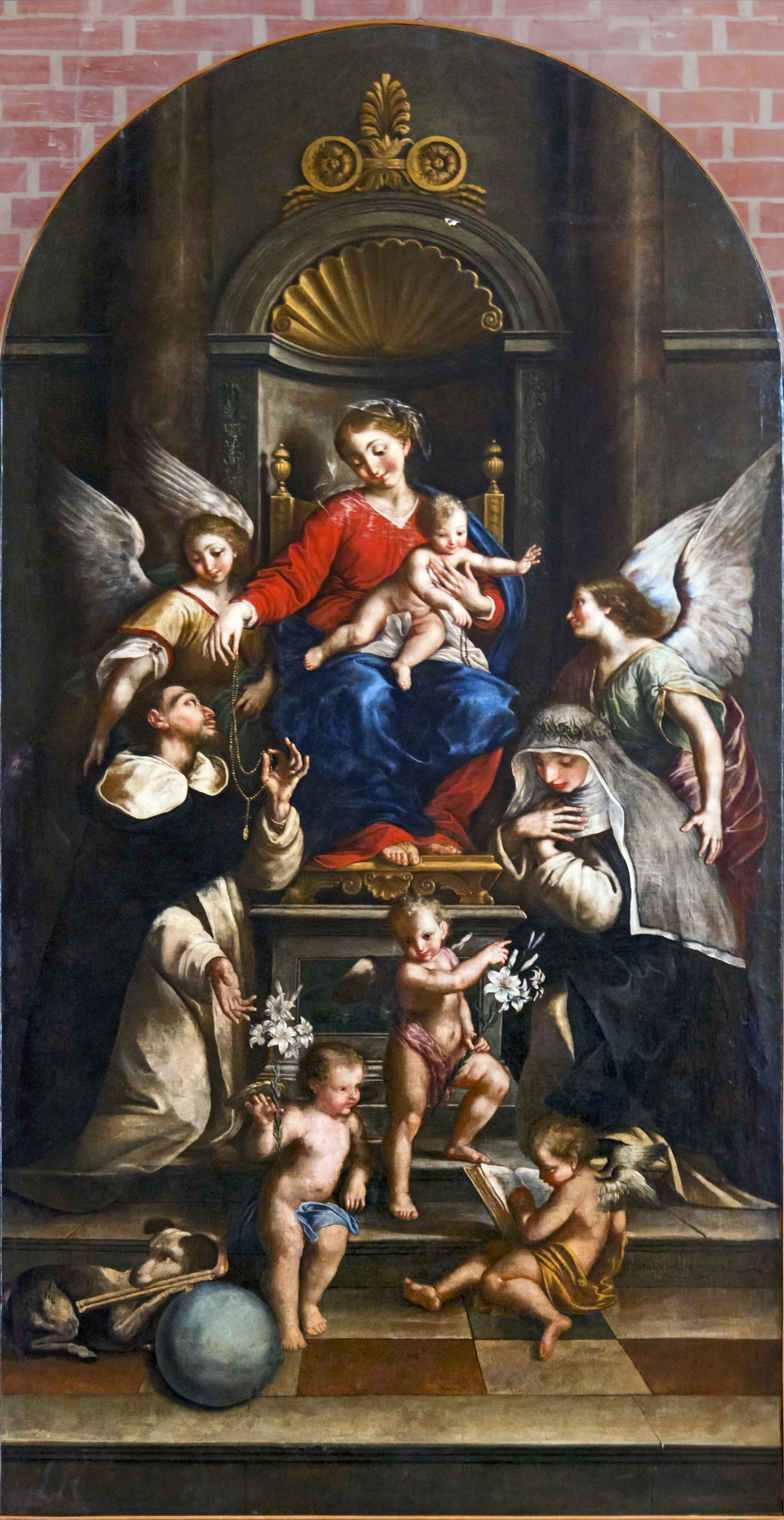
Madonna del Rosario altarpiece at Santi Giovanni e Paolo, Venice

In 1765, after stopping briefly in Bologna, he settled in Venice as a guest, it seems, of the Cavalli patricians. Here he dedicated himself both to the production of altarpieces, with a classicist approach, and to genre painting, with influences from Pietro Longhi.

He died in Rome.
