= Giuseppe Statella =

Italian footballer

Personal information
- Date of birth: 15 March 1988 (age 38)
- Place of birth: Melito di Porto Salvo, Italy
- Height: 1.80 m (5 ft 11 in)
- Position: Midfielder

Youth career
- Bari

Senior career*
Years	Team	Apps	(Gls)
2006–2014	Bari	5	(1)
2008–2009	→ Benevento (loan)	22	(3)
2009	→ Salernitana (loan)	10	(0)
2010	→ Torino (loan)	3	(0)
2010	→ Grosseto (loan)	11	(0)
2011	→ Fidelis Andria (loan)	14	(1)
2012–2013	→ Pavia (loan)	42	(5)
2014–2015	Pro Vercelli	25	(1)
2015–2018	Cosenza	107	(17)
2018	Ternana	17	(0)
2018–2020	Catanzaro	53	(1)
2020–2021	Vibonese	25	(2)
2021–2022	Lavello	18	(3)
2022	ACR Messina	15	(1)
2022–2023	Gelbison	7	(0)

International career^{‡}
2006	Italy U-19	2	(1)
- * Club domestic league appearances and goals as of 21 January 2023 ‡ National team caps and goals as of 21 September 2006

Giuseppe Statella (born 15 March 1988) is an Italian professional footballer who plays as a midfielder.

== Club career ==
On 5 October 2020 he joined Vibonese.

On 26 July 2021, he moved to Lavello in Serie D.

On 31 January 2022, Statella returned to Serie C and signed with ACR Messina.

On 25 August 2022, Statella signed with freshly-promoted Serie C club Gelbison. His contract with Gelbison was terminated by mutual consent on 27 January 2023.
