= Francesco Montenegro =

Italian prelate

His Eminence Francesco Montenegro
- Cardinal; Archbishop Emeritus of Agrigento
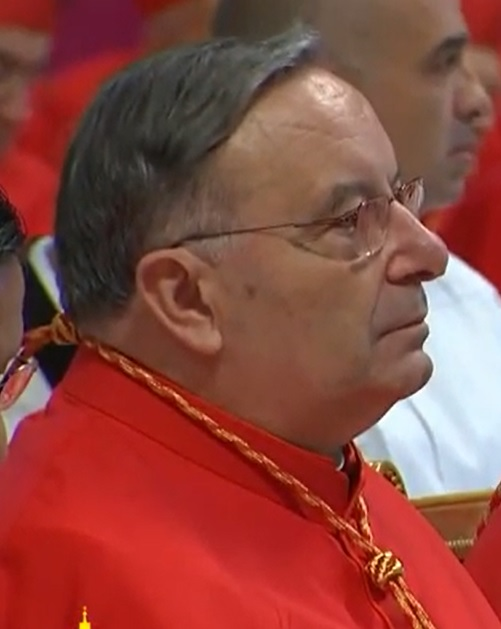
- Cardinal Francesco Montenegro during Consistory 2015.
- Church: Roman Catholic Church
- Archdiocese: Agrigento
- See: Agrigento
- Appointed: 23 February 2008
- Installed: 17 May 2008
- Term ended: 22 May 2021
- Predecessor: Carmelo Ferraro
- Successor: Alessandro Damiano
- Other post: Cardinal-Priest of Santi Andrea a Gregorio al Monte Celio (2015-)
- Previous post: Auxiliary Bishop of Messina-Lipari-Santa Lucia del Mela (2000–08)

Orders
- Ordination: 8 August 1969 by Francesco Fasola
- Consecration: 18 March 2000 by Giovanni Marra
- Created cardinal: 14 February 2015 by Pope Francis
- Rank: Cardinal-Priest

Personal details
- Born: 22 May 1946 (age 80) Messina, Italy
- Motto: Caritas Sine Modo (Love without Limit)
- Coat of arms

Ordination history of Francesco Montenegro
History
Priestly ordination
- Date: 8 August 1969
Episcopal consecration
- Principal consecrator: Giovanni Marra
- Co-consecrators: Ignazio Cannavo; Francesco Sgalambro
- Date: 29 April 2000
Cardinalate
- Elevated by: Pope Francis
- Date: 14 February 2015
Episcopal succession
Bishops consecrated by Francesco Montenegro as principal consecrator
- Alessandro Damiano: 5 September 2020

Styles of Francesco Montenegro
- Reference style: His Eminence
- Spoken style: Your Eminence
- Religious style: Cardinal
- Informal style: Cardinal

Francesco Montenegro (born 22 May 1946) is an Italian prelate of the Roman Catholic Church. He served as the Archbishop of Agrigento from 2008 until 2021. Pope Francis made him a cardinal on 14 February 2015.

== Early life and career ==
Francesco Montenegro was born in Messina on 22 May 1946. He studied philosophy and theology at the Archdiocesan Seminary Saint Pius X there. He was ordained a priest on 8 August 1969 and then continued his studies at the Ignatianum of Messina. He did parish work during 1969–1971 in a suburban area of the city of Messina and in 1971–1978 served as secretary to the Archbishops of Messina Francesco Fasola and Ignazio Cannavò.

From 1978 to 1988 he was pastor of the parish of San Clemente in Messina and then director of the diocesan branch of Caritas, regional delegate of Caritas, and finally regional representative of the Italian Caritas.

He also fulfilled assignments as a professor of religion, diocesan assistant of Italian Sports Center, diocesan director of the Apostleship of Prayer, rector of the church sanctuary of Santa Rita and spiritual adviser of the minor seminary, and a member of the Council of Priests.

From 1997 to 2000, he was pro-vicar general of the Archdiocese of Messina-Lipari-Santa Lucia del Mela and served as well beginning in 1998 as proto-metropolitano canon of the chapter of the cathedral of Messina.

== Bishop, archbishop and cardinal ==
On 18 March 2000, Pope John Paul II appointed him auxiliary bishop of Messina-Lipari-Saint Lucia del Mela and titular bishop of Aurusuliana. He received his episcopal consecration on 29 April 2000 in the cathedral of Messina from Archbishop Giovanni Marra.

From May 2003 to May 2008, and again from May 2015 to December 2018, he was President of Italian Caritas.

On 23 February 2008, Pope Benedict XVI named him Archbishop of Agrigento, replacing Carmelo Ferraro, who had resigned because of his age. He took possession of the archdiocese on 17 May.

Since May 2013, he has been President of the Commission for Migration of the Italian Episcopal Conference.

On 4 January 2015, Pope Francis announced that he would make Montenegro a cardinal during the consistory in Rome on 14 February. At that ceremony, he was assigned the titular church of Santi Andrea e Gregorio al Monte Celio. On 13 April 2015, Pope Francis appointed Montenegro a member of Pontifical Council Cor Unum and Pontifical Council for the Pastoral Care of Migrants and Itinerant People. Pope Francis also named him to participate in the Synod on the Family in October 2015.

Pope Francis appointed Alessandro Damiano Archbishop Coadjutor of Agrigento in anticipation of Montenegro's retirement on 30 April 2020 and accepted Montenegro's resignation on 22 May 2021.

Montenegro was named a member of the Congregation for the Causes of Saints on 7 August 2021.

On 19 June 2023, Pope Francis nominated him as Apostolic Administrator sede vacante of the Greek Catholic Eparchy of Piana degli Albanesi.

Montenegro participated as a cardinal elector in the 2025 papal conclave that elected Pope Leo XIV.

== See also ==
- Cardinals created by Pope Francis

Catholic Church titles
Preceded by Francesco Sgalambro	Auxiliary Bishop of Messina–Lipari–Santa Lucia del Mela; 18 March 2000 – 23 February 2008	Succeeded by Cesare Di Pietro
Preceded by Luciano Bux	— TITULAR — Titular Bishop of Aurusuliana; 18 March 2000 – 23 February 2008	Succeeded by Adam Bałabuch
Preceded by Carmelo Ferraro	Archbishop of Agrigento; 23 February 2008 – 22 May 2021	Succeeded by Alessandro Damiano
Preceded by Edmund Szoka	Cardinal-Priest of Santi Andrea e Gregorio al Monte Celio; 14 February 2015 –	Incumbent
