= Luigi Natoli =

Italian bishop and archbishop (1799–1875)

- Bishop of Caltagirone, Archbishop of Messina
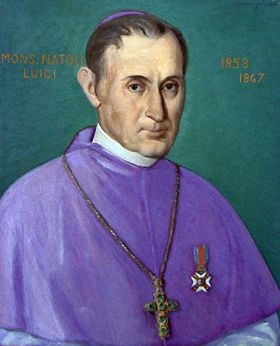

Personal details
- Born: 15 June 1799 Patti, Sicily, Italy
- Died: 24 February 1875 Messina
- Denomination: Roman Catholic

Luigi Natoli (15 June 1799 – 24 February 1875) was a Sicilian Roman Catholic priest. He was born in Patti, in north-eastern Sicily. He was ordained on 2 March 1822; was appointed bishop of the Caltagirone on 15 March 1858; and became archbishop of Messina on 22 February 1867. He died on 24 February 1875.

== Luigi Natoli and His Relationship with Pope Pius IX ==
Luigi Natoli was the Archbishop of Messina and an important figure in the Roman Catholic Church in Sicily during the 19th century. He was a close friend of Pope Pius IX.

Natoli was appointed Bishop of Caltagirone by Pope Pius IX and participated in the First Vatican Council, where he supported the doctrine of papal infallibility promoted by Pope Pius IX himself. His ecclesiastical work demonstrated close collaboration with the pope and strong commitment to the teachings of the Roman Catholic Church.
