= Giacomo di Santa Lucia =

Most Reverend Giacomo di Santa Lucia
- Archbishop (personal title) of Patti
- Church: Catholic Church
- Diocese: Diocese of Patti
- In office: 1480–1482
- Successor: Giacomo Antonio Leofanti
- Previous post: Archbishop of Messina (1474–1480)

Personal details
- Died: 1482 Patti, Italy

Giacomo di Santa Lucia (died 1482) was a Roman Catholic prelate who served as Archbishop (personal title) of Patti (1480–1482) and Archbishop of Messina (1474–1480).

== Biography ==
Giacomo di Santa Lucia was ordained a priest in the Order of Friars Minor. On 23 May 1474, he was appointed by Pope Sixtus IV as Archbishop of Messina. On 7 July 1480, he was appointed by Pope Sixtus IV as Archbishop (personal title) of Patti and Titular Archbishop of Philippi. He served as Archbishop of Patti until his death in 1482.

== External links and additional sources ==
- Cheney, David M. "Archdiocese of Messina-Lipari-Santa Lucia del Mela". Catholic-Hierarchy.org. (for Chronology of Bishops) ^{[self-published]}
- Chow, Gabriel. "Archdiocese of Messina-Lipari-Santa Lucia del Mela (Italy)". GCatholic.org. (for Chronology of Bishops) ^{[self-published]}
- Cheney, David M. "Diocese of Patti". Catholic-Hierarchy.org. (for Chronology of Bishops) ^{[self-published]}
- Chow, Gabriel. "Diocese of Patti". GCatholic.org. (for Chronology of Bishops) ^{[self-published]}

Catholic Church titles
Preceded by Antonio Cerdà i Lloscos	Archbishop of Messina; 1474–1480	Succeeded by Pietro de Luna
Preceded by	Archbishop (personal title) of Patti; 1480–1482	Succeeded by Giacomo Antonio Leofanti
