= Giacomo Antonio Leofanti =

Italian Roman Catholic prelate

Most Reverend Giacomo Antonio Leofanti
- Bishop of Patti
- Church: Catholic Church
- Diocese: Diocese of Patti
- In office: 1486–1494
- Predecessor: Giacomo di Santa Lucia
- Successor: Giovanni Marquet

Personal details
- Died: 1494 Patti, Italy

Giacomo Antonio Leofanti (died 1494) was a Roman Catholic prelate who served as Bishop of Patti (1486–1494).

== Biography ==
On 9 February 1486, he was appointed by Pope Innocent VIII as Bishop of Patti. He served as Bishop of Patti until his death in 1494.

== External links and additional sources ==
- Cheney, David M. "Diocese of Patti". Catholic-Hierarchy.org. (for Chronology of Bishops) ^{[self-published]}
- Chow, Gabriel. "Diocese of Patti". Gcatholic. (for Chronology of Bishops) ^{[self-published]}

Catholic Church titles
Preceded by Giacomo di Santa Lucia	Bishop of Patti; 1486–1494	Succeeded by Giovanni Marquet
