= Giovanni Marquet =

Italian Roman Catholic prelate

Most Reverend Giovanni Marquet
- Bishop of Patti
- Church: Catholic Church
- Diocese: Diocese of Patti
- In office: 1494–1499
- Predecessor: Giacomo Antonio Leofanti
- Successor: Miguel Figueroa (bishop)

Personal details
- Died: 1499 Patti, Italy

Giovanni Marquet (died 1499) was a Roman Catholic prelate who served as Bishop of Patti (1494–1499).

He was ordained a priest in the Order of Preachers. On 16 June 1494, he was appointed by Pope Alexander VI as Bishop of Patti. He served as Bishop of Patti until his death in 1499.

== External links and additional sources ==
- Cheney, David M. "Diocese of Patti". Catholic-Hierarchy.org. (for Chronology of Bishops) ^{[self-published]}
- Chow, Gabriel. "Diocese of Patti". GCatholic.org. (for Chronology of Bishops) ^{[self-published]}

Catholic Church titles
Preceded by Giacomo Antonio Leofanti	Bishop of Patti; 1494–1499	Succeeded by Miguel Figueroa (bishop)
