= Vincenzo Napoli =

Vincenzo Napoli may refer to:

- Vincenzo Napoli (bishop) (1574-1648), Italian Roman Catholic bishop
- Vincenzo Napoli (politician) (born 1950), Italian politician
