= Miguel Figueroa (bishop) =

Italian Roman Catholic prelate

Most Reverend Miguel Figueroa
- Bishop of Patti
- Church: Catholic Church
- Diocese: Diocese of Patti
- In office: 1500–1517
- Predecessor: Giovanni Marquet
- Successor: Francisco de Urríes
- Previous post: Auxiliary Bishop of Zaragoza (1500)

Orders
- Consecration: 8 November 1501 by Juan Ortega Bravo de la Laguna

Personal details
- Died: 10 May 1517 Patti, Italy

Miguel Figueroa (died 10 May 1517) was a Roman Catholic prelate who served as Bishop of Patti (1500–1517) and as Auxiliary Bishop of Zaragoza (1500)

== Biography ==
On 4 September 1500, he was appointed by Pope Alexander VI as Bishop of Patti and Auxiliary Bishop of Zaragoza. On 8 November 1501, he was consecrated bishop by Juan Ortega Bravo de la Laguna, Bishop of Calahorra y La Calzada, with Guillermo Ramón de Moncada, Bishop of Tarazona, and Juan Crespo, Bishop of Ales, serving as co-consecrators. He served as Bishop of Patti until his death on 10 May 1517.

== See also ==
- Catholic Church in Italy

== External links and additional sources ==
- Cheney, David M. "Diocese of Patti". Catholic-Hierarchy.org. (for Chronology of Bishops) ^{[self-published]}
- Chow, Gabriel. "Diocese of Patti". GCatholic.org. (for Chronology of Bishops) ^{[self-published]}

Catholic Church titles
Preceded by Giovanni Marquet	Bishop of Patti; 1500–1517	Succeeded by Francisco de Urríes
