= Patti Cathedral =

Cathedral in Patti, Italy

Coordinates: 38.1382°N 14.9640°E

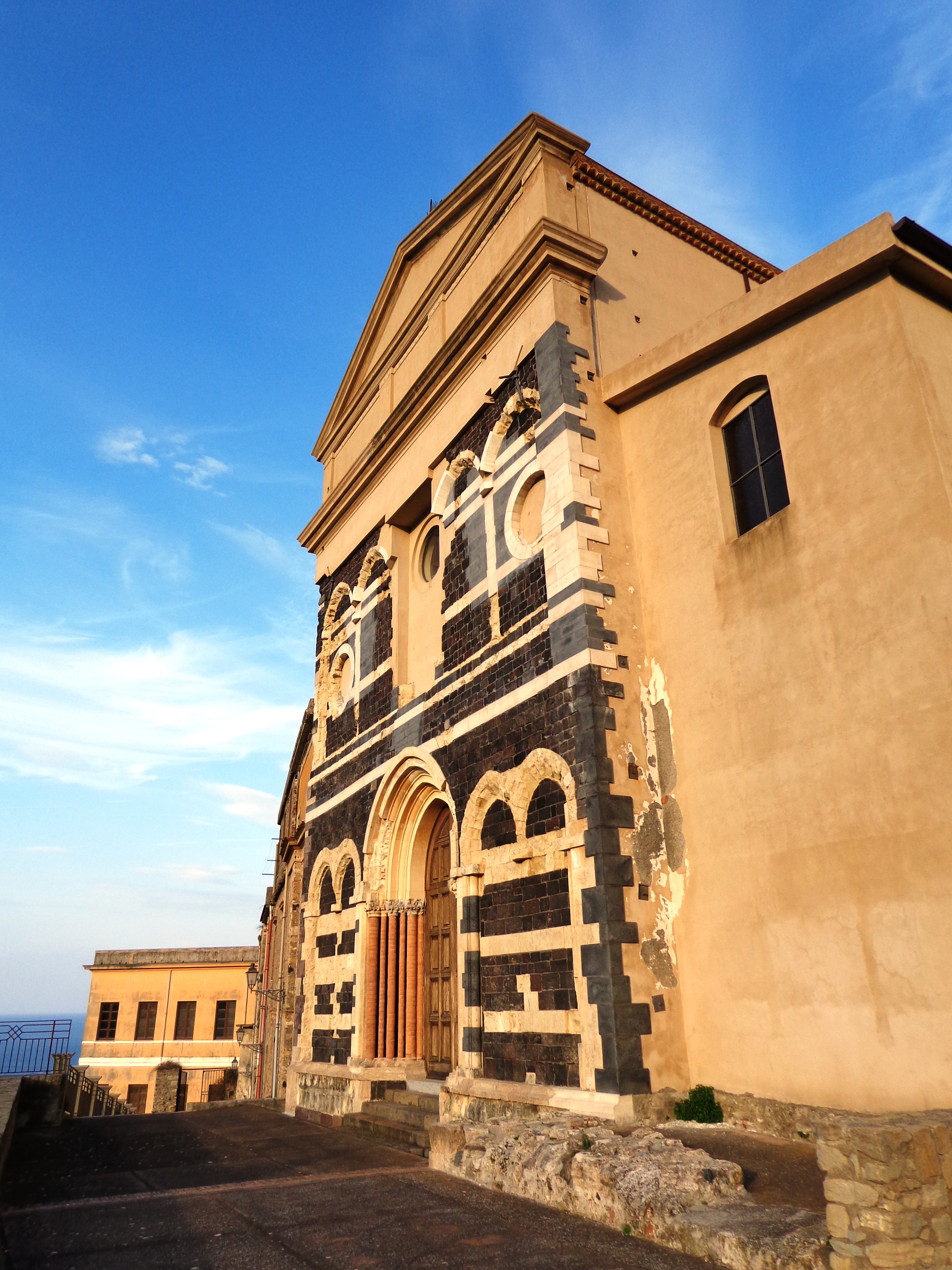
Patti Cathedral

Patti Cathedral (Italian: Duomo di Patti; Basilica cattedrale di San Bartolomeo) is a Roman Catholic cathedral in Patti, Sicily, Italy, dedicated to Saint Bartholomew.

Count Roger of Altavilla founded the Benedictine monastery of the Most Holy Savior in the 1090s; he had the church built and dedicated to St. Bartholomew the Apostle.

The central portal is in Gothic style; inside the cathedral are works of art and funeral monuments, including the sarcophagus of Queen Adelasia, wife of Count Roger and mother of Roger II, first king of Sicily. as well as Madonna and Child Enthroned between Angels by Antonello de Saliba and the 18th century The Adoration of the Shepherds.

The tympanum includes a coat of arms of the Bourbons.

After an earthquake in 1693, the cathedral had to be almost completely rebuilt.

It is the episcopal seat of the Diocese of Patti.
