= Tindari =

Frazione of Italy

- Lu Tìnnaru (Sicilian); Tyndaris (Greek)
- Tyndaris; Tyndarion
- Ancient Propylaeum Gate and Arch

- Location within Sicily
- 38°08′44″N 15°02′23″E
- Type: Settlement
- Periods: Archaic Greek to Byzantine period
- Cultures: Ancient Greece
- Location: Patti, Italy

Tindari (Italian: [ˈtindari]; Sicilian: Lu Tìnnaru [lʊ ˈtinnaɾʊ]), ancient Tyndaris (Ancient Greek: Τυνδαρίς, Strab.) or Tyndarion (Τυνδάριον, Ptol.), is a small town, frazione (suburb or municipal component) in the comune of Patti and a Latin Catholic titular see.

The monumental ruins of ancient Tyndaris are a main attraction for visitors and excavations are continuing to reveal more parts of the city.

Tindari has a famous sanctuary and is also famous for the poem Vento a Tindari, written by Salvatore Quasimodo.

== History ==
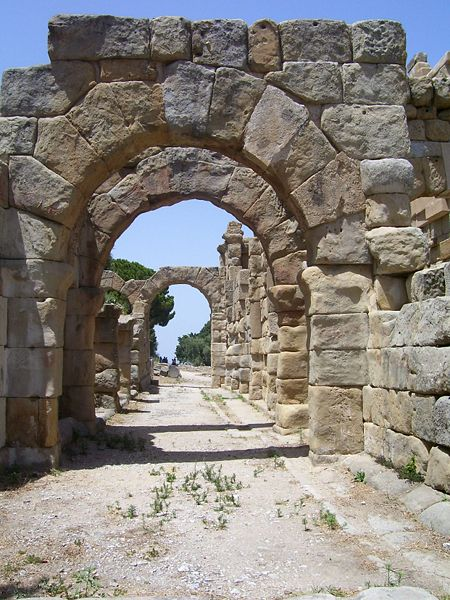
The monumental propylaeum gate from the inside

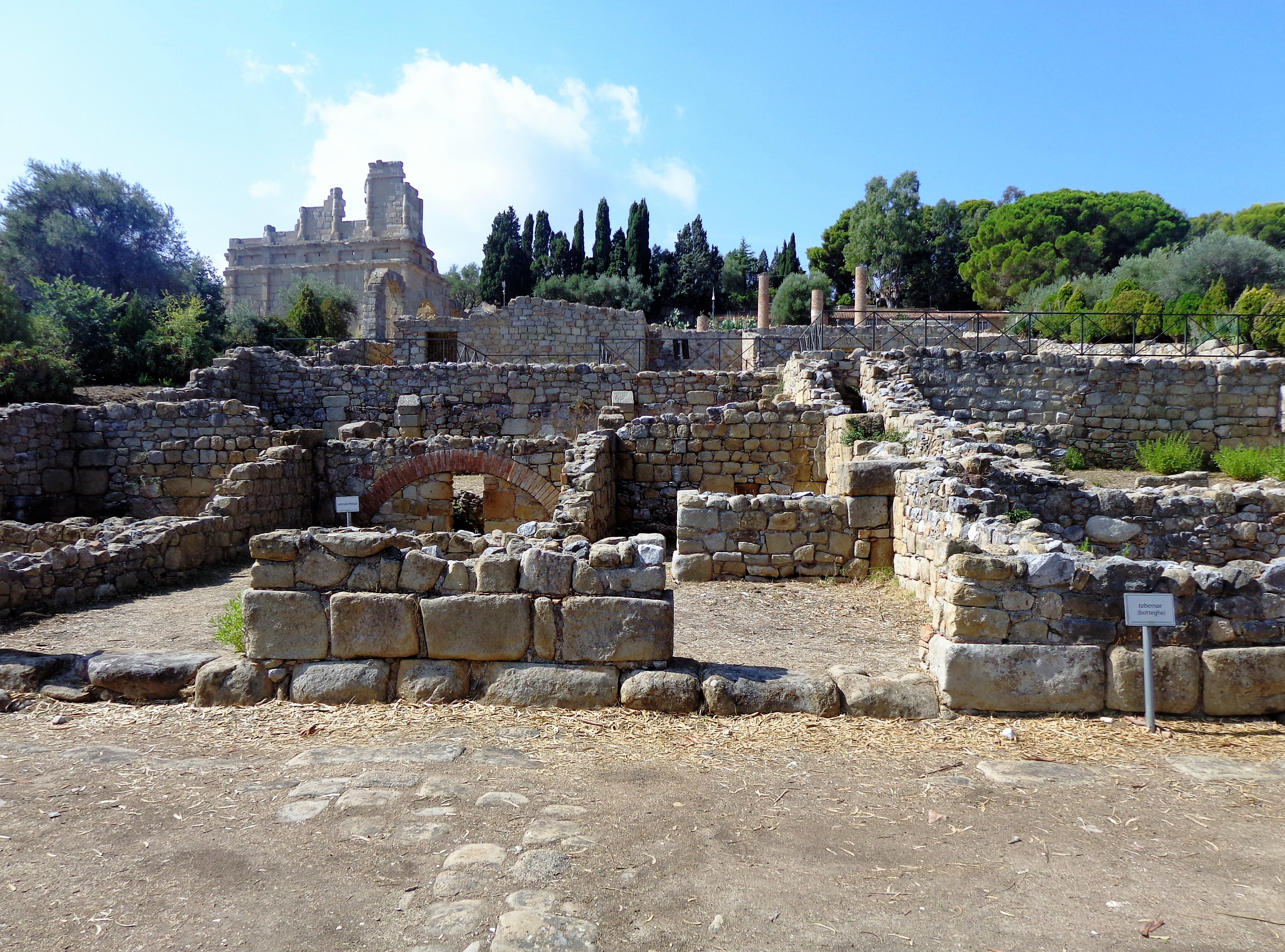
Roman Domus

Ancient Tyndaris was strategically situated on its prominent hill overlooking the wide bay of the Tyrrhenian Sea bounded by the Capo di Milazzo on the east, and the Capo Calavà on the west. It was connected by a comparatively narrow isthmus with the lower ground inland. It thus commanded views of the summit of Mount Etna and northwards to the Lipari Islands.

It was one of the latest of all the cities in Sicily that could claim a purely Greek origin, having been founded by the elder Dionysius in 396 or 395 BC in Magna Graecia; the site is so strategic that it is a surprise it was not occupied earlier. The original settlers were the remains of the Messenian exiles, who had been driven from Naupactus, Zacynthus, and the Peloponnese by the Spartans after the close of the Peloponnesian War. These had at first been established by Dionysius at Messana, when he repeopled that city; but the Spartans having taken umbrage at this, he transferred them to the site of Tyndaris, which had previously been included in the territory of Abacaenum. The colonists themselves gave to their new city the name of Tyndaris, from their native divinities, the "Tyndaridae" or Dioscuri, and readily admitting fresh citizens from other quarters, soon raised their whole population to the number of 5000 citizens. The new city thus rose at once to be a place of considerable importance.

It is next mentioned in 344 BC, when it was one of the first cities that declared in favor of Timoleon after his landing in Sicily. At a later period we find it mentioned as espousing the cause of Hieron, and supporting him during his war against the Mamertines, 269 BC. On that occasion he rested his position upon Tyndaris on the left, and on Tauromenium (modern Taormina) on the right. Indeed, the strong position of Tyndaris made it an important strategic post on the Tyrrhenian sea, as Tauromenium was on the Sicilian sea, and hence we find it frequently mentioned in accounts of subsequent wars. In the First Punic War it was at first dependent upon Carthage; and though the citizens, alarmed at the progress of the Roman armies, were at one time on the point of turning to Rome, they were restrained by the Carthaginians, who carried off all the chief citizens as hostages. In 257 BC, the Battle of Tyndaris took place off the coast of Tyndaris, between the city and the Liparaean islands, in which a Roman fleet under Gaius Atilius Regulus obtained some advantage over the Carthaginian fleet, but without any decisive result. The Roman fleet is described on that occasion as touching at the promontory of Tyndaris, but the city had not yet fallen into their hands, and it was not until after the fall of Panormus (modern Palermo) in 254 BC that Tyndaris expelled the Carthaginian garrison and joined the Roman alliance.

Little is heard of Tyndaris under Roman government, but it appears to have been a flourishing and considerable city. Cicero calls it nobilissima civitas and we learn from him that the inhabitants had displayed their zeal and fidelity towards the Romans upon many occasions. Among others they supplied naval forces for the armament of Scipio Africanus the Younger, a service for which he repaid them by restoring to them a statue of Mercury which had been carried off by the Carthaginians and which continued as an object of great veneration in the city, until it was stolen by the rapacious Verres. Tyndaris was also one of seventeen cities selected by the Roman Senate, apparently as an honorary distinction, to contribute to certain offerings to the temple of Venus at Eryx. In other respects it had no peculiar privileges, and was in the condition of an ordinary municipal town, with its own magistrates, local senate, etc., but was certainly in the time of Cicero one of the most considerable places in the island. It, however, suffered severely from the exactions of Verres and the inhabitants, to revenge themselves on their oppressor, publicly demolished his statue as soon as he had quit the island.

Tyndaris again bore a considerable part in the Sicilian revolt between Sextus Pompeius and Octavian. It was one of the points occupied and fortified by the former, when preparing for the defence of the Sicilian straits, but was taken by Agrippa after his naval victory at Mylae, and became one of his chief posts, from which he carried on offensive warfare against Pompey. Subsequently, to this we hear nothing more of Tyndaris in history; but there is no doubt of its having continued to subsist throughout the period of the Roman Empire. Strabo speaks of it as one of the places on the north coast of Sicily which, in his time, still deserved the name of cities; and Pliny gives it the title of a Colonia. It is probable that it received a colony under Augustus, as we find it bearing in an inscription the titles of Colonia Augusta Tyndaritanorum. Pliny indeed mentions a great calamity which the city had sustained, when (he tells us) half of it was swallowed up by the sea, probably from an earthquake having caused the fall of part of the hill on which it stands, but we have no clue to the date of this event. The Itineraries attest the existence of Tyndaris, apparently still as a considerable place, in the fourth century.

== Ecclesiastical history ==
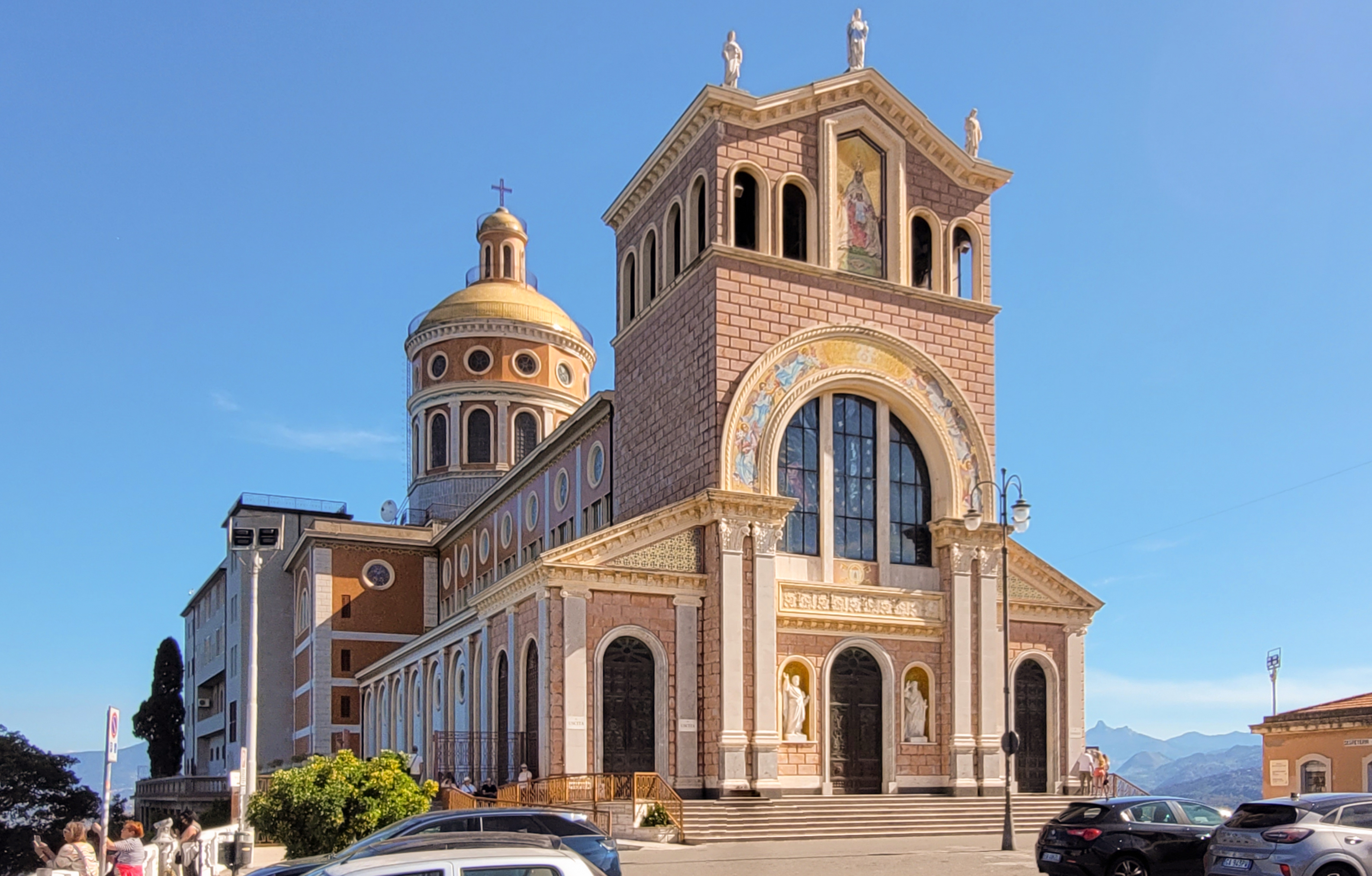
Sanctuary of Tindari

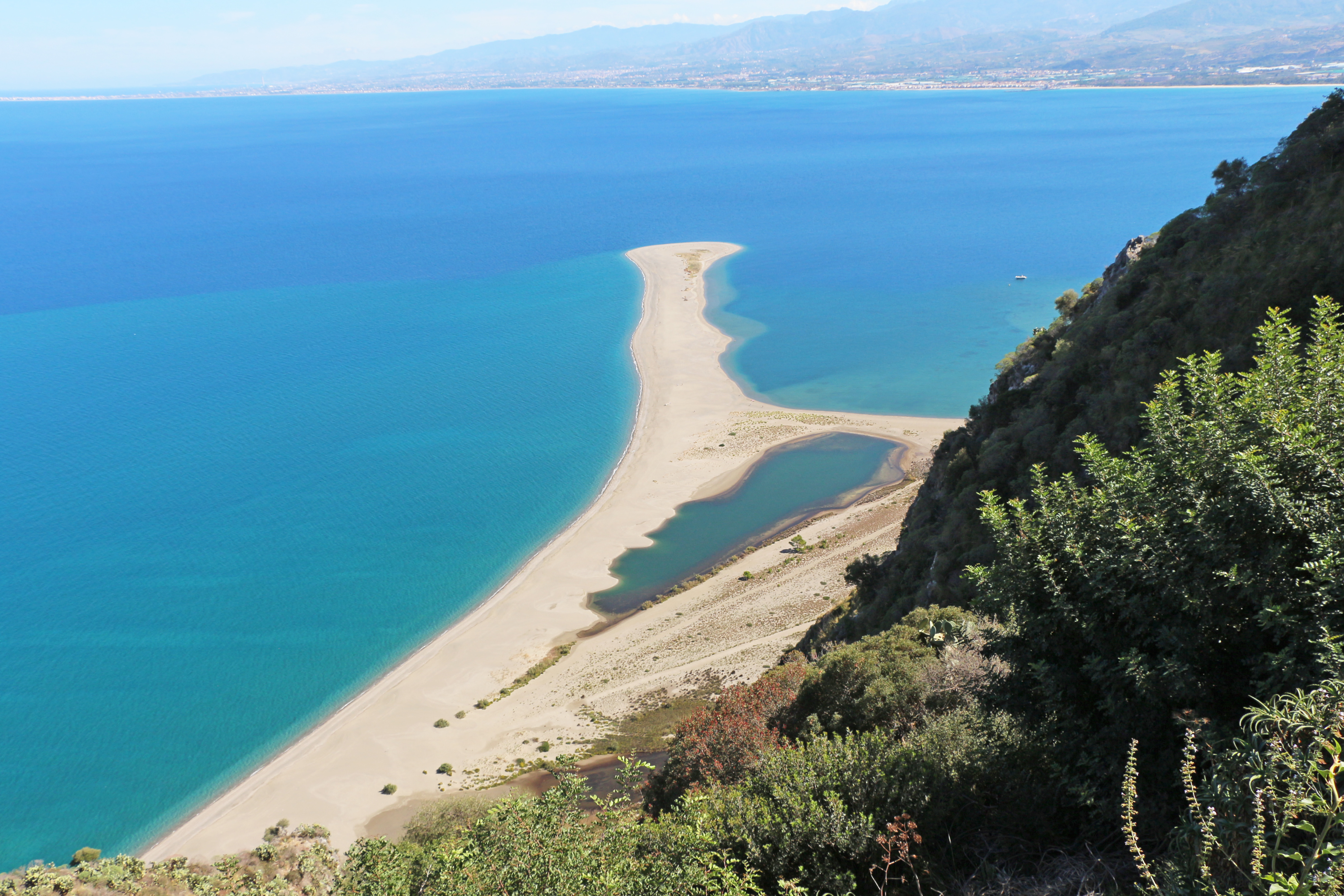
Lagoon of Tindari included in the nature reserve of Marinello

- Established in 498 as Diocese of Tindari (Italian) / Tyndaris (Latin) / Tyndaritan(us) (Latin adjective). In the early 7th century Sicily had no Metropolitan see, so although politically part of the Byzantine Empire, all its bishoprics were in the sway of the papal ('Western') Patriarchate of Rome as (exempt) suffragan dioceses of Rome. During the conflict on Iconoclasm, Byzantine emperor Leo III the Isaurian transferred all Sicily to his capital's Patriarchate of Constantinople (circa 732); in the 8th or 9th century, the newly created Metropolitan Archdiocese of Syracuse was given all Sicilian bishoprics as suffragans, including Tindari, where no bishops were recorded since 649.
- Although the Notitia Episcopatuum under emperor Leo VI (early 10th century) still lists Tindari among the suffragans of Syracuse, that probably was just canonical theory, as in 836 Tindari was conquered for Islam by Arabs and nothing is heard from the diocese.
- Formally suppressed in 880 without direct successor, but lost (some) territory in 1082 to establish the short-lived Diocese of Troina (suppressed in 1098 to establish the Diocese of Messina). When Sicilia was again conquered and Christianize by the Normans in the 11th century, the bishopric wasn't restored, its territory rather assigned to the new Diocese of Patti.

=== Titular see ===
The diocese was nominally restored in 1968 as Latin Titular bishopric of Tindari (Curiate Italian) / Tyndaris (Latin) / Tyndaritan(us) (Latin adjective)

== Remains ==
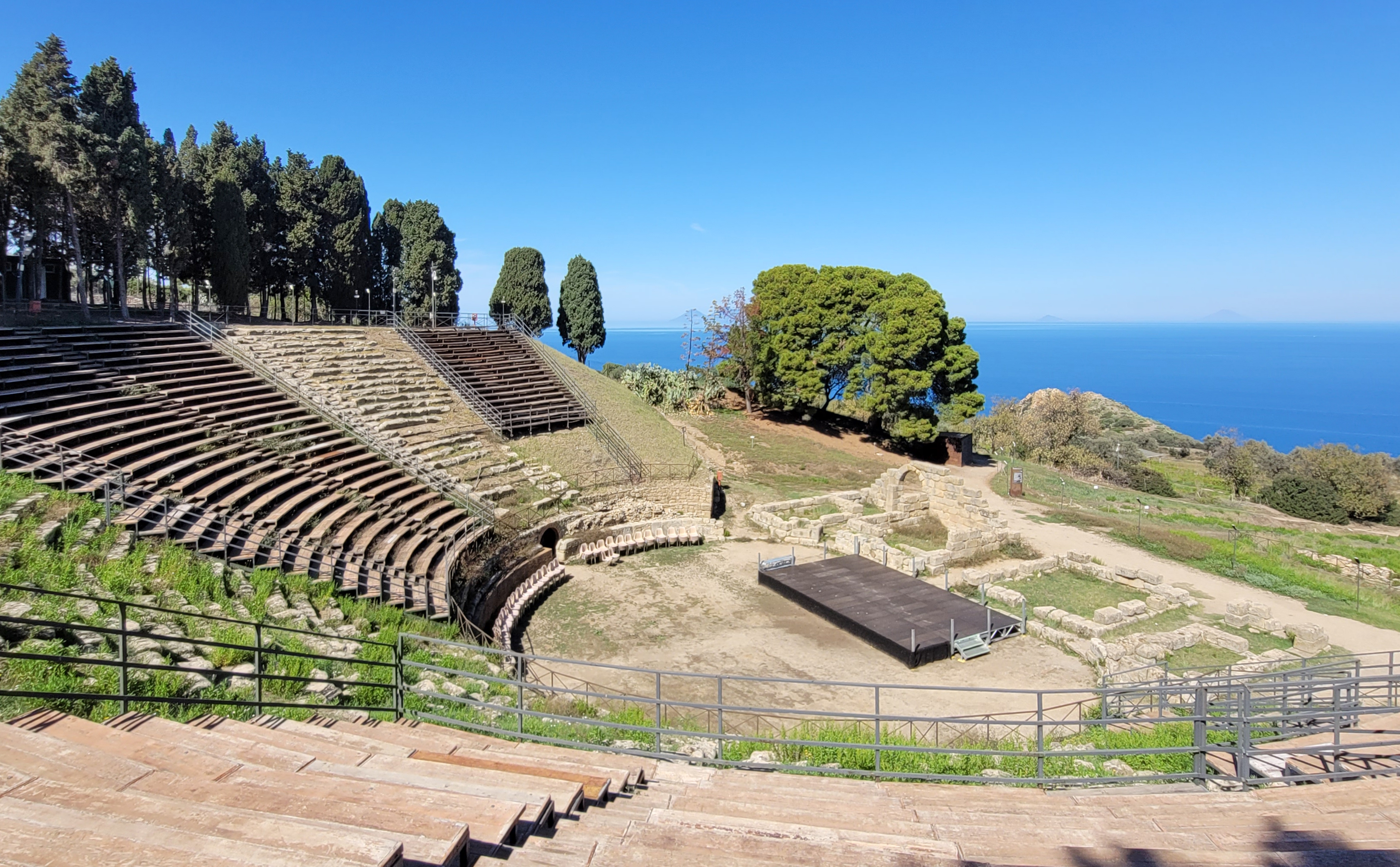
Theatre

By the 19th century, the site of Tyndaris was wholly deserted, but the name was retained by a church, which crowned the most elevated point of the hill on which the city formerly stood, and was still called the Madonna di Tindaro. It is c. 180 m above the sea-level, and forms a conspicuous landmark to sailors. Considerable ruins of the ancient city, are also visible. It occupied the whole plateau or summit of the hill, and the remains of the ancient walls may be traced, at intervals, all round the brow of the cliffs, except in one part, facing the sea, where the cliff is now quite precipitous. It is not improbable that it is here that a part of the cliff fell in, in the manner recorded by Pliny Two gates of the city are also still distinctly to be traced.

The chief monuments, of which the ruins are still extant within the circuit of the walls, are:

- the theatre, of which the remains are in imperfect condition, but sufficient to show that it was not of large size, and apparently of Roman construction, or at least, like that of Tauromenium, rebuilt in Roman times upon the Greek foundations
- a propylaeum with two handsome stone arches (previously called a Gymnasium)
- several other edifices of Roman times, but of wholly uncertain character, a mosaic pavement and some Roman tombs.

Numerous inscriptions, fragments of sculpture, and architectural decorations, as well as coins, vases etc. have also been discovered on the site.

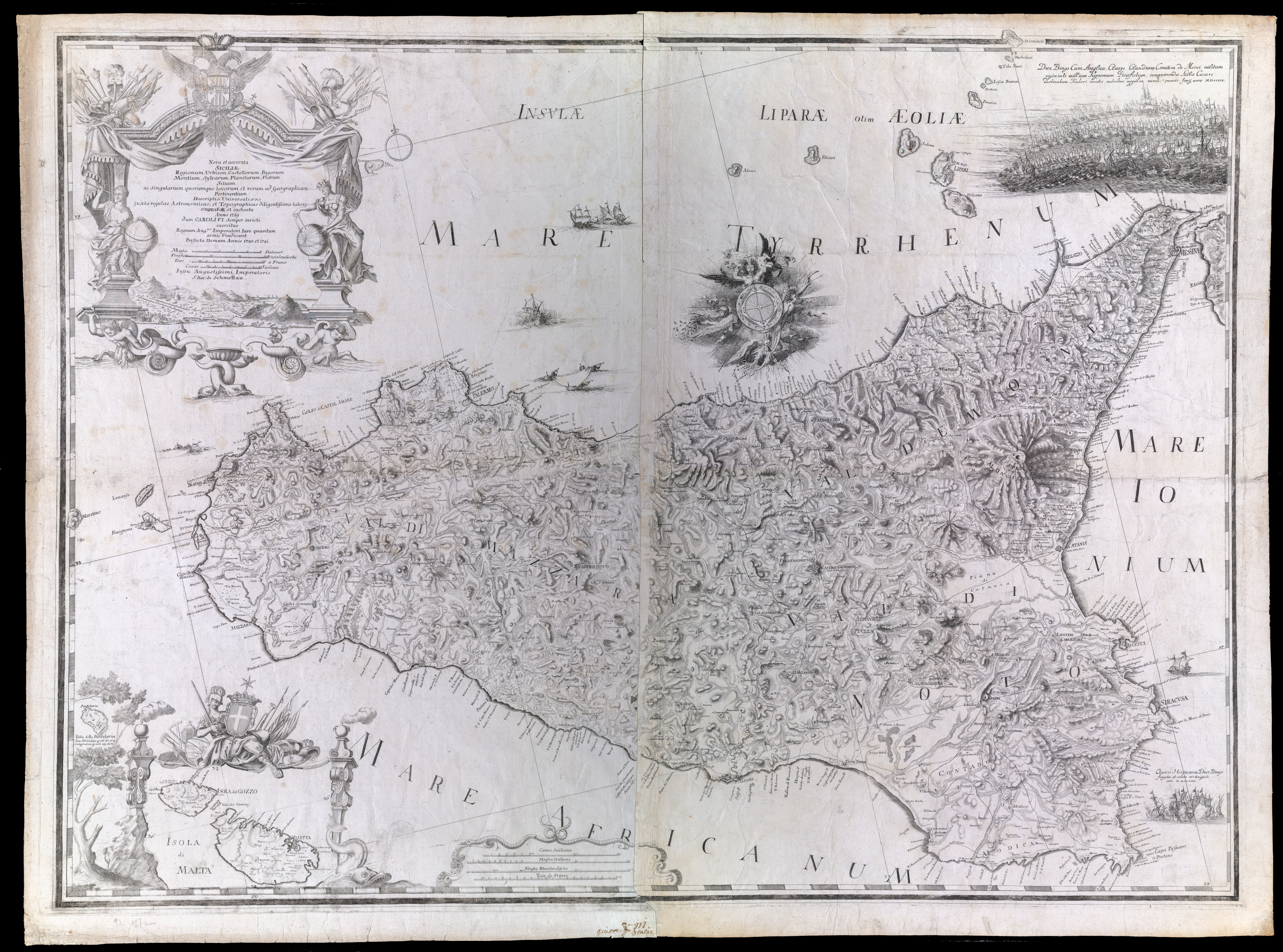
Includes vignettes of the British fleet commanded by Admiral John Byng in the Battle of Capo Passero (1718), and landing at Tindari (1719).

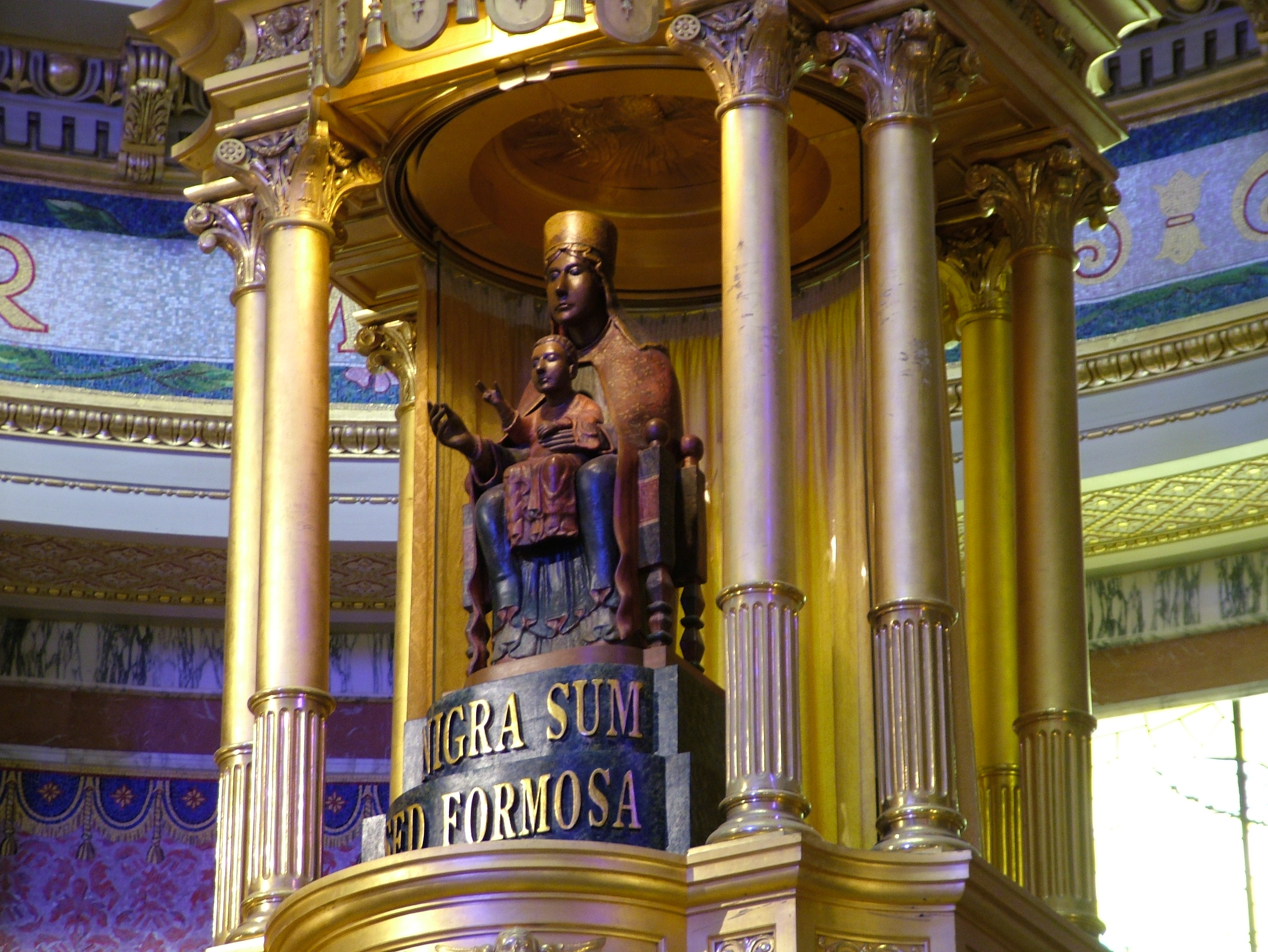
The Black Madonna of Tindari celebrated the 7–8 September, inscribed NIGRA SUM SED FORMOSA, meaning "I am black but beautiful".

== Legend ==
Local legend tells that the lagoon was created after a pilgrim who came to see the Madonna refused to pray to the Madonna because she was black. The woman accidentally dropped her baby into the ocean and the Madonna made the land rise to save the baby. The sands of Marinello have taken shape of the profile of the Madonna.

== Cultural references ==
An episode of Inspector Montalbano was called "Excursion to Tindari". It ends with four of the main characters overlooking the bay. Salvatore Quasimodo, who would later be awarded the Nobel prize for literature, in 1930 published a poem entitled "Vento a Tindari" (Wind at Tindari).

== Accessibility ==
By car, if you come from Falcone, of Autostrada Messina-Palermo take Palermo direction along SS 113.

Tindari and its Church are reachable by trains run by Trenitalia, including services from Messina with the Oliveri railway station situated on the Palermo–Messina railway. Outside of the station is available an Uber service by app.

Tindari is also served by bus provided from Azienda Siciliana Trasporti.

== See also ==
- List of Catholic dioceses in Italy

== Sources and external links ==
- GCatholic - former and titular bishopric
- Fasolo Michele (December 10, 2013). Tyndaris e il suo territorio I: Introduzione alla carta archeologica del territorio di Tindari. MediaGEO. ISBN 978-88-908755-1-9.
- Diocese of Patti on BeWeB - Beni ecclesiastici in web

Bibliography

- Fasolo, Michele (2013). Tyndaris e il suo territorio I.Introduzione alla carta archeologica del territorio di Tindari (in Italian). Rome: mediaGEO. ISBN 978-88-908755-1-9.
- Fasolo, Michele (2014). Tyndaris e il suo territorio II. Carta archeologica del territorio di Tindari e materiali (in Italian). Rome: mediaGEO. ISBN 978-88-908755-2-6.
- Rocco Pirri, Sicilia sacra, vol. I, Palermo 1733, p. 493
- Giuseppe Cappelletti, Le Chiese d'Italia dalla loro origine sino ai nostri giorni, Venice 1870, vol. XXI, pp. 587–588
- Francesco Lanzoni, Le diocesi d'Italia dalle origini al principio del secolo VII (an. 604), vol. II, Faenza 1927, p. 650
