= Sgalambro =

Sgalambro is an Italian surname. Notable people with the surname include:

- Francesco Sgalambro (1934–2016), Italian Roman Catholic bishop
- Manlio Sgalambro (1924–2014), Italian philosopher and writer
