= Urríes =

Urríes is a surname. Notable people with the surname include:

- Francisco de Urríes (died 1551), Roman Catholic prelate
- Jaime Jordán de Urríes (born 1977), Spanish footballer
