= Dionysius O'Driscoll =

17th-century Roman Catholic bishop

Most Reverend Dionysius O'Driscoll
- Archbishop of Brindisi
- Church: Catholic Church
- Archdiocese: Archdiocese of Brindisi
- In office: 1640–1650
- Predecessor: Francesco Surgenti
- Successor: Lorenzo Reynoso

Orders
- Consecration: 9 Apr 1640 by Gil Carrillo de Albornoz

Personal details
- Born: Ireland
- Died: August 1650

Dionysius O'Driscoll, O.F.M. Obs. or Dionysius Odriscol (died 1650) was a Roman Catholic prelate who served as Archbishop of Brindisi (1640–1650).

== Biography ==
Dionysius O'Driscoll was born in Ireland and ordained a priest in the Order of Friars Minor Observant. On 5 Mar 1640, he was appointed during the papacy of Pope Urban VIII as Archbishop of Brindisi. On 9 Apr 1640, he was consecrated bishop by Gil Carrillo de Albornoz, Cardinal-Priest of Santa Maria in Via, with Vincenzo Napoli, Bishop of Patti, and Deodato Scaglia, Bishop of Melfi e Rapolla, serving as co-consecrators. He served as Archbishop of Brindisi until his death in Aug 1650.

== External links and additional sources ==
- Cheney, David M. "Archdiocese of Brindisi-Ostuni". Catholic-Hierarchy.org. (for Chronology of Bishops) ^{[self-published]}
- Chow, Gabriel. "Archdiocese of Brindisi-Ostuni (Italy)". GCatholic.org. (for Chronology of Bishops) ^{[self-published]}

Catholic Church titles
Preceded by Francesco Surgenti	Archbishop of Brindisi; 1640–1650	Succeeded by Lorenzo Reynoso
