= Vincenzo Napoli (bishop) =

Italian Roman Catholic prelate (died 1648)

Most Reverend Vincenzo Napoli
- Bishop of Patti
- Church: Catholic Church
- Diocese: Diocese of Patti
- In office: 1609–1648
- Predecessor: Juan de Rada
- Successor: Ludovico Ridolfi

Orders
- Consecration: 6 December 1609 by Giovanni Garzia Mellini

Personal details
- Died: 23 August 1648 Patti, Italy

Vincenzo Napoli (died 1648) was a Roman Catholic prelate who served as Bishop of Patti (1609–1648).

== Biography ==
On 2 December 1609, Vincenzo Napoli was appointed during the papacy of Pope Paul V as Bishop of Patti. On 6 December 1609, he was consecrated bishop by Giovanni Garzia Mellini, Bishop of Imola, with Lucio de Morra, Archbishop of Otranto, and Antonio Albergati, Bishop of Bisceglie, serving as co-consecrators. He served as Bishop of Patti until his death on 23 August 1648.

While bishop, he was the principal co-consecrator of Dionysius O'Driscoll, Archbishop of Brindisi (1640); and Marcello Stella, Bishop of Isernia (1640).

== External links and additional sources ==
- Cheney, David M. "Diocese of Patti". Catholic-Hierarchy.org. (for Chronology of Bishops) ^{[self-published]}
- Chow, Gabriel. "Diocese of Patti". GCatholic.org. (for Chronology of Bishops) ^{[self-published]}

Catholic Church titles
Preceded by Juan de Rada	Bishop of Patti; 1609–1648	Succeeded by Ludovico Ridolfi
