= Diocese of Caltagirone =

Roman Catholic diocese in Italy

Coordinates: 37.2333°N 14.5167°E

Diocese of Caltagirone Dioecesis Calatayeronensis

Catholic
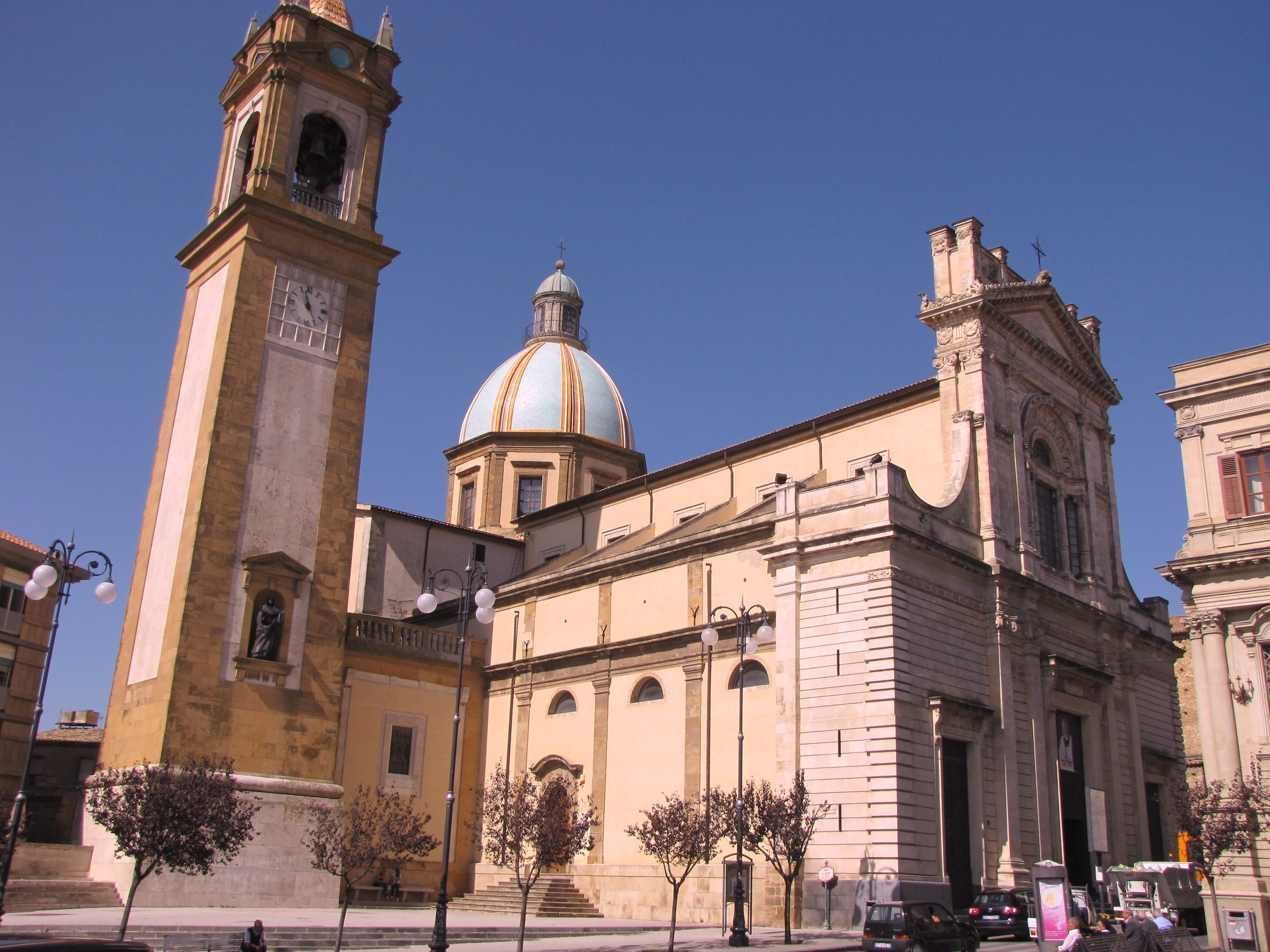
- Exterior of the Cathedral of Caltagirone

Location
- Country: Italy
- Ecclesiastical province: Catania

Statistics
- Area: 1,551 km^{2} (599 sq mi)
- Population: Total; Catholics: (as of 2023); 138,780 ▼; 132,320 ▼ (95%)
- Parishes: 57

Information
- Denomination: Catholic Church
- Rite: Roman Rite
- Established: 12 September 1816 (210 years ago)
- Cathedral: Basilica Cattedrale di S. Giuliano
- Secular priests: 79 (diocesan) ▲13 (religious Orders) ▲12 Permanent Deacons

Current leadership
- Pope: Leo XIV
- Bishop: Calogero Peri, OFMCap

Map
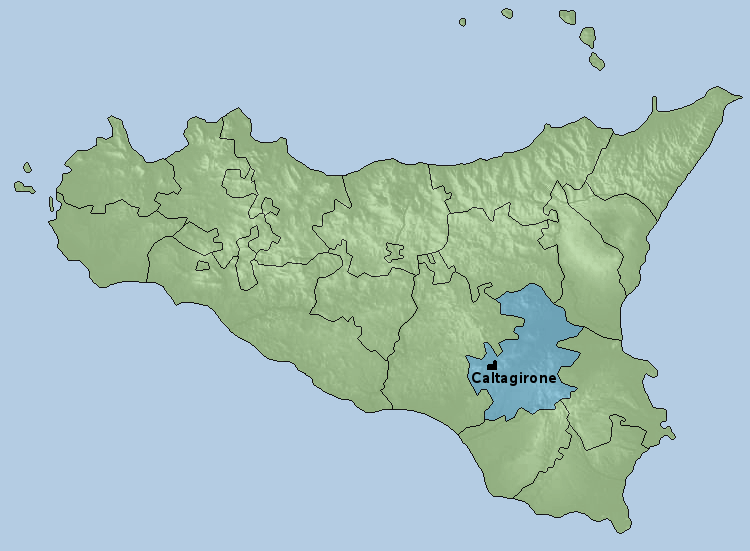

Website
- Diocesan web site (in Italian)

The Diocese of Caltagirone (Latin: Dioecesis Calatayeronensis) is a Latin Church diocese of the Catholic Church situated in the eastern interior of Sicily. Before 1816, its territory was part of the diocese of Siracusa. From 1816 to 1844, it was a suffragan of the archdiocese of Monreale. It became subject to the new archdiocese of Siracusa in 1844. In the diocesan reorganization of Sicily in 2000, became a suffragan of the archdiocese of Catania.

The seat of the bishop is in the city of Caltagirone, in the Basilica Cathedral of S. Giuliano.

== History ==
The town of Caltagirone was severely damaged by the great earthquake of 1693. Out of a population of 12,339, some 800 persons were killed. Half of the buildings were reparable, the other half were not. The principal church of S. Giuliano was in ruins, as was S. Giacomo (patron of the city), the church of the Conventual Franciscans, and the church of S. Bonaventura. The Jesuit college lost its façade, and the residence and bell tower were uninhabitable. The Carmelites, Dominicans, the Fate Bene Brothers, and the Crociferi lost their churches and residences.

=== Early considerations ===
Pope Pius VII had been approached on two occasions by King Ferdinand of Naples and Sicily about dividing the extensive diocese of Siracusa, once in 1802 following the death of Bishop Alagona, and again in 1807 following the death of Bishop Bonanno. But the Papal States were under French occupation, and in 1804 the pope was compelled to go to Paris for the coronation of the Emperor Napoleon. In 1809, the Papal States were annexed by the French Empire, and the pope was taken prisoner to France and then to Savona. In June 1814, following the fall of Napoleon, he returned to Rome.

From 1806 to 1815, King Ferdinand was in exile from the kingdom of Naples, which was occupied by Joseph Bonaparte and then Joachim Murat, calling themselves kings of Naples. Having recovered his mainland possessions, Ferdinand proclaimed the union of Naples and Sicily in the Kingdom of the Two Sicilies on 12 December 1816.

=== Erection ===
The main city, where the cathedral of St. Giuliano is located, is Caltagirone. S. Giuliano had been a parish church and, since 1631, a collegiate church, with a Chapter, led by four dignities: the Provost, the Dean, the Cantor, and the Treasurer; and sixteen canons.

The diocese of Caltagirone was created on 12 September 1816 with the papal bull Romanus Pontifex of Pope Pius VII, and with the permission (exequatur) of the King of Naples which was registered on 20 February 1818. The diocese consists of fifteen towns in the province of Catania: Caltagirone, Castel di Judica, Grammichele, Mazzarrone, San Michele di Ganzaria, Raddusa, Ramacca, Mirabella Imbaccari, Scordia, Militello in Val di Catania, Palagonia, Mineo, Licodia Eubea, San Cono and Vizzini. The territory is subdivided into 57 parish churches.

The collegiate Chapter of S. Giuliano was abolished, and the church reduced to the status of a simple parish church. It was then elevated to the rank of a cathedral, and the cathedral Chapter was created; it had five dignities (the Archdeacon, the Provost, the Dean, the Cantor, and the Treasurer) sixteen canons, and twelve secondary canons mansionarii.

The diocese of Caltagirone was made a suffragan of the archdiocese of Monreale.

Pius VII granted to the kings of the Two Sicilies the privilege, whenever a vacancy in the episcopal office occurred, of nominating a suitable person to be bishop, subject to the approval of the pope.

Gaetano Trigona e Parisi was nominated the first bishop of Caltagirone by King Ferdinand on 18 June 1818, and confirmed by Pope Pius VII on 21 December 1818.

==== Minor basilicas ====
The Collegiate Church of S. Giacomo (Sancti Jacobi) in Caltagirone was granted the honor and title of "minor basilica" by Pope Pius VII on 12 September 1816, in the bull "Romanus Pontifex". Its Chapter consisted of four dignities and eight canons.

The church of the Assumption of the Virgin Mary, called "Cœnadomini" in Caltagirone was granted the honor and title of "minor basilica" by Pope Paul VI on 27 June 1963, in the Apostolic Brief entitled "Praesidium Decusque'. The earlier church had been ruined in the great earthquake of 1693,

The church of San Nicolò–Santissimo Salvatore in Milteto (diocese of Caltagirone) was granted the honor and title of "minor basilica" by Pope Francis in 2021.

==== Suffragan ====
Originally Caltagirone was a suffragan of the diocese of Monreale, but from 20 May 1844 it was transferred by Pope Gregory XVI to the ecclesiastical province of Siracusa. From 2 December 2000, with the Pope John Paul II's papal bull, Ad maiori consulendum, the diocese became a suffragan of archdiocese of Catania. On 20 March 2010, the 15th bishop of Caltagirone, Calogero Peri, OFMCap, was the first bishop to be consecrated in the cathedral Saint Julian in Caltagirone.

Bishop Giovanni Bargigia presided at the second diocesan synod in Caltagirone, summoned by him on 6 January 1933.

== Bishops ==
- Gaetano Trigona e Parisi (21 December 1818 – 15 April 1833)
- Benedetto Denti, OSB (15 April 1833 – 3 August 1853)
- Giuseppe Maria Maniscalco, OFM (17 April 1854 – 10 April 1855)
- Luigi Natoli (15 March 1858 – 22 February 1867)

Sede vacante (1867–1872)

- Antonio Morana (23 February 1872 – 18 August 1879)
- Giovanni Battista Bongiorno (22 September 1879 – 14 March 1887)
- Saverio Gerbino (14 March 1887 – 16 March 1898)
- Damaso Pio De Bono (28 November 1898 – 17 December 1925)
- Giovanni Bargiggia (14 March 1927 – 6 July 1937)
- Pietro Capizzi (12 August 1937 – 11 November 1960)
- Francesco Fasola, OSSGCN (11 November 1960 – 25 June 1963)
- Carmelo Canzonieri (30 July 1963 – 8 January 1983)
- Vittorio Luigi Mondello (30 July 1983 – 28 July 1990)
- Vincenzo Manzella (30 April 1991 – 17 September 2009)
- Calogero Peri, OFMCap, from 30 January 2010

== See also ==
- Luigi Natoli (bishop)

== Sources ==
- Cappelletti, Giuseppe (1870). Le chiese d'Italia dalla loro origine sino ai nostri giorni (in Italian). Vol. vigesimoprimo (21). Venezia: Antonelli. pp. 628–629.
- D'Avino, Vincenzio (1848). Cenni storici sulle chiese arcivescovili, vescovili, e prelatizie (nullius) del regno delle due Sicilie (in Italian). Naples: dalle stampe di Ranucci. pp. 129–131.. [article by Saverio Grasso].
- Manduca, Raffaele (2014). La Sicilia e l'inchiesta sui regolari di Pio IX: La diocesi di Caltagirone. (in Italian). Messina: Il Grano Edizioni, 2014.
- Panebianco, Raffaele (2021). La diocesi di Caltagirone nella riforma del Concilio Vaticano II. (in Italian) (Booksprint, 2021).
- Ritzler, Remigius; Sefrin, Pirminus (1968). Hierarchia Catholica medii et recentioris aevi (in Latin). Vol. 7 (1800–1846). Monasterii: Libr. Regensburgiana.
- Ritzler, Remigius; Sefrin, Pirminus (1978). Hierarchia catholica Medii et recentioris aevi (in Latin). Vol. 8 (1846–1903). Il Messaggero di S. Antonio.
- Pięta, Zenon (2002). Hierarchia catholica medii et recentioris aevi (in Latin). Vol. 9 (1903–1922). Padua: Messagero di San Antonio. ISBN 978-88-250-1000-8.

=== External links ===
- Diocesan website (in Italian)
