= Villa Romana di Patti =

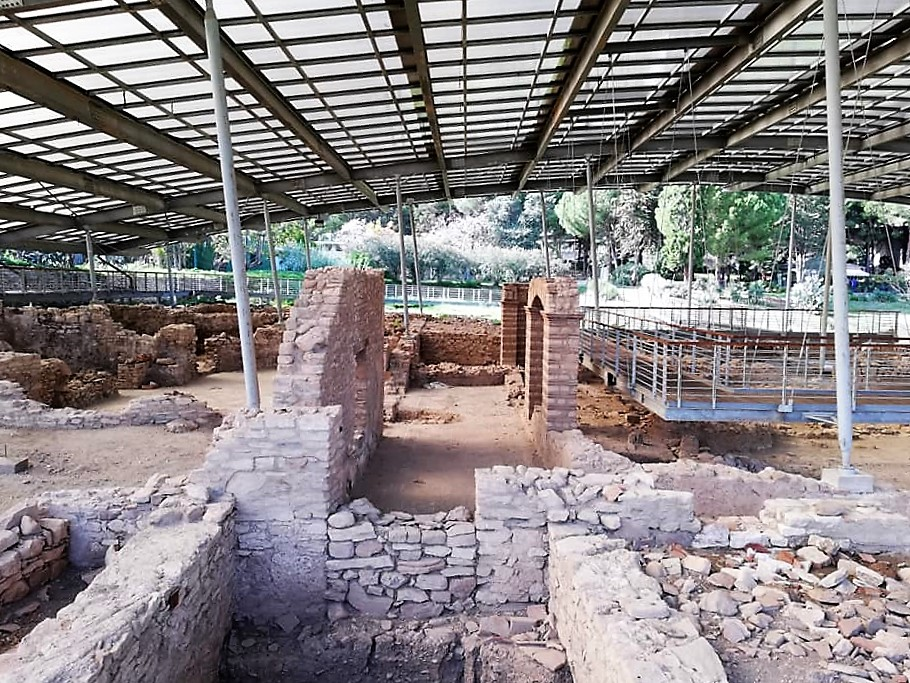
- The archaeological site of the villa

- Location within Sicily
- 38°8′57″N 14°58′19″E
- Periods: Roman Imperial
- Location: Patti, Italy

History
- Built: 2nd c. AD
- Abandoned: Approximately 10th c. AD

Site notes
- Owner: Public
- Management: Soprintendenza per i Beni Culturali ed Ambientali di Messina

The Villa Romana di Patti is a large and elaborate Roman villa located in the comune of Patti in the province of Messina on Sicily.

It was the seat of a rich latifundium estate, which until its discovery had few known examples except for the Villa Romana del Casale.

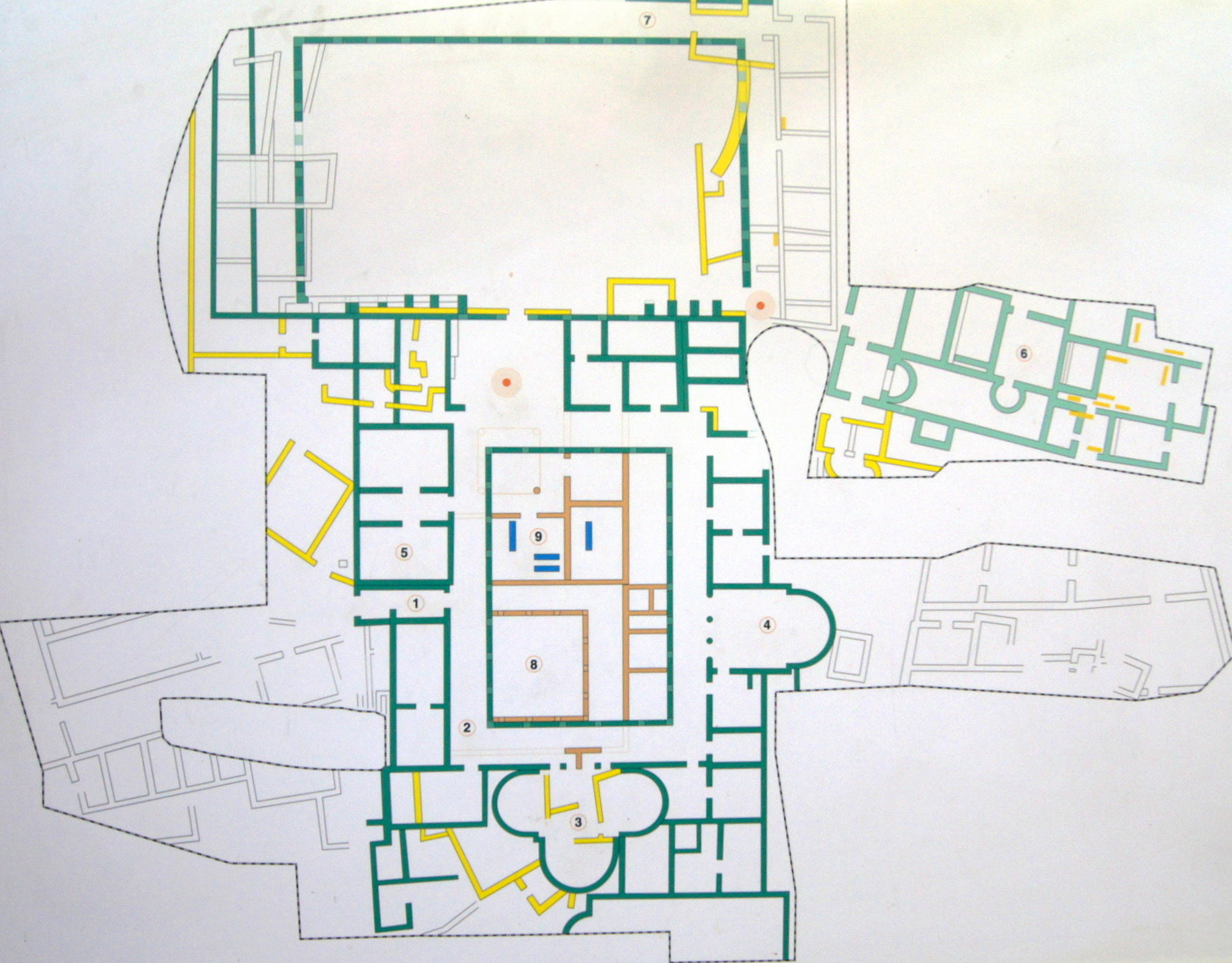
Plan of Villa di Patti

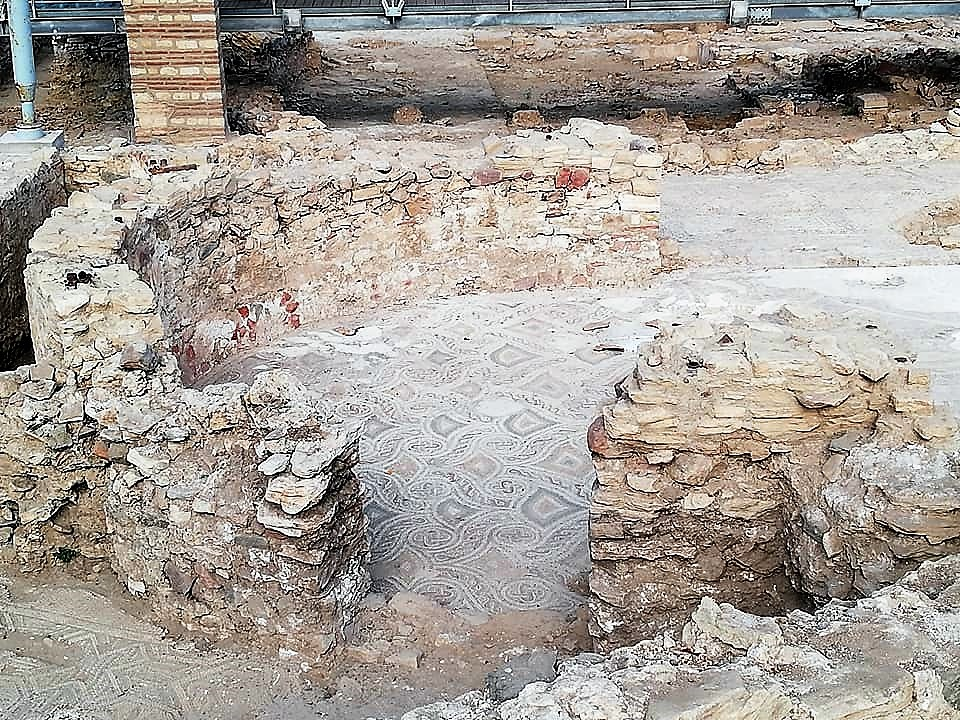
VR Patti 28 10 2018 10

== History and description ==
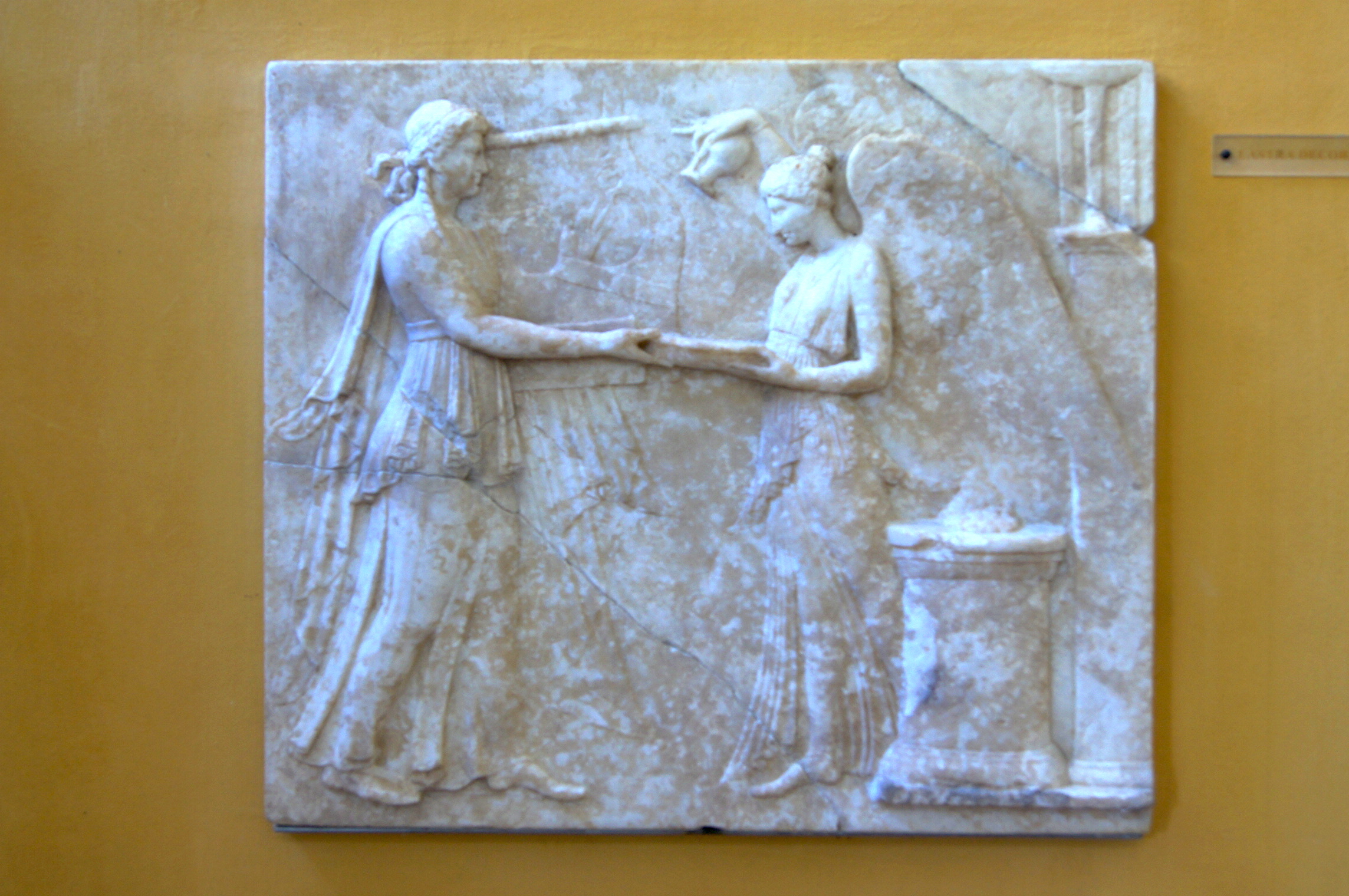
Relief from Villa di Patti

The villa was discovered in 1973 during construction work on a stretch of the A20 motorway, when part of its north side was destroyed.

Although excavation is continuing and many rooms still need to be revealed, the general configuration of the villa is already quite clear.

The original villa was constructed in the 2nd-3rd centuries AD and was demolished to make way for a larger and much more elaborate villa built over it in the early 4th century AD.

The nucleus of the later villa consists of a peristyle surrounded by residential rooms, typical of the late Roman villa. The most representative rooms are, on the west wing, the particularly large Aula Absidata ("apse hall") which recalls the Piazza Armerina basilica, and on the south wing a tri-apsidal room where the peristyle overlooked the sea. The Aula Absidata contained a mosaic floor now destroyed, but the mosaic floors of the peristyle and tri-apse are in excellent condition. The east–west orientation of the Aula Absidata, different from the north–south axis of the peristyle, raises doubts about its function and dating, suggesting that it might have been a church built after the owner had converted to Christianity.

The mosaic of the peristyle consists of a grid of square panels set within a frame of continuous laurel wreaths, enriched with floral and ornamental motifs. The mosaic of the tri-apse includes octagonal and circular medallions with animals on curvilinear sides. The quality of both polychrome mosaics is not very high, which indicates they were the product of a Sicilian workshop instead of North African craftsmen.

In the north-east area, a bath system had walls built using a different technique.

The residence had been abandoned before the earthquake that affected Sicily in AD 365.

After the earthquake between the sixth and seventh centuries, the remains of the villa were partly restored, and there was continuing habitation at least until the tenth century AD.

The site has been re-covered in recent years by a special protective roof.
