= Ludovico Ridolfi =

17th-century Roman Catholic bishop

Most Reverend Ludovico Ridolfi
- Bishop of Patti
- Church: Catholic Church
- Diocese: Diocese of Patti
- In office: 1649
- Predecessor: Vincenzo Napoli
- Successor: Luca Conchiglia

Orders
- Consecration: 12 Sep 1649 by Alfonso de la Cueva-Benavides y Mendoza-Carrillo

Personal details
- Born: 5 Sep 1587 Rome, Italy
- Died: 28 Oct 1649 (age 62)

Ludovico Ridolfi (1587–1649) was a Roman Catholic prelate who served as Bishop of Patti (1649).

== Biography ==
Ludovico Ridolfi was born on 5 Sep 1587 in Rome, Italy. On 3 Mar 1649, he was selected as Bishop of Patti and confirmed by Pope Innocent X on 19 Jul 1649. On 12 Sep 1649, he was consecrated bishop by Alfonso de la Cueva-Benavides y Mendoza-Carrillo, Cardinal-Bishop of Palestrina, with Luca Torreggiani, Archbishop of Ravenna, and Francesco Tontori, Bishop of Ischia, serving as co-consecrators. He served as Bishop of Patti until his death on 28 Oct 1649.

== External links and additional sources ==
- Cheney, David M. "Diocese of Patti". Catholic-Hierarchy.org. (for Chronology of Bishops) ^{[self-published]}
- Chow, Gabriel. "Diocese of Patti". GCatholic.org. (for Chronology of Bishops) ^{[self-published]}

Catholic Church titles
Preceded by Vincenzo Napoli	Bishop of Patti; 1649	Succeeded by Luca Conchiglia
