= Giovanni Marra =

Italian Roman Catholic prelate (1931–2018)

- Archbishop of Messina-Lipari-Santa Lucia del Mela
- Church: Catholic Church
- Archdiocese: Archdiocese of Messina-Lipari-Santa Lucia del Mela
- In office: 17 May 1997 – 18 November 2006
- Predecessor: Ignazio Cannavò
- Successor: Calogero La Piana
- Other post: Apostolic Administrator of Orvieto-Todi (2011-2012)
- Previous posts: Titular Archbishop of Rebellum (1989-1997); Auxiliary Bishop of Rome (1986-1997); Archbishop of the Military Ordinariate of Italy (1989-1996); Titular Bishop of Usula (1986-1989)

Orders
- Ordination: 19 September 1953 by Vincenzo De Chiara
- Consecration: 28 June 1986 by Ugo Poletti

Personal details
- Born: 5 February 1931 Cinquefrondi, Province of Reggio Calabria, Kingdom of Italy
- Died: 11 July 2018 (aged 87) Rome, Italy

Giovanni Marra (5 February 1931 – 11 July 2018) was an Italian Roman Catholic prelate.

Ordained to the priesthood in 1953, Marra was appointed bishop of Usula in 1986. He subsequently led the Military Ordinariate of Italy from 1989 until his resignation in 1996. The next year Marra was named archbishop of Messina–Lipari–Santa Lucia del Mela, serving until retirement in 2006. He died on 11 July 2018, aged 87.
