= Francesco Fasola =

Italian Catholic Archbishop (1898-1988)

Servant of God Francesco Fasola OSSGCN
- Archbishop Emeritus of Messina
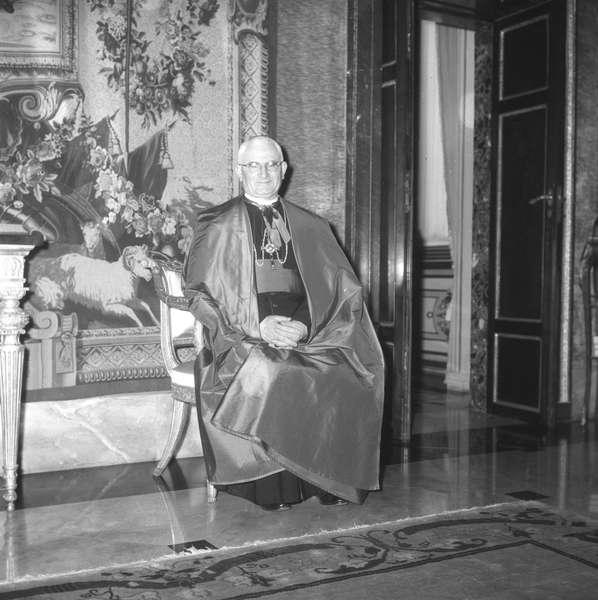
- Church: Roman Catholic Church
- Archdiocese: Messina
- See: Messina
- Appointed: 25 June 1963
- Installed: 15 September 1963
- Term ended: 3 June 1977
- Predecessor: Angelo Paino
- Successor: Ignazio Cannavò
- Previous posts: Titular Bishop of Vartana (1954–1960); Coadjutor Bishop of Agrigento (1954–1960); Bishop of Caltagirone (1960–1963); Archimandrite of Santissimo Salvatore of the Italo-Albanese (1963–1977)

Orders
- Ordination: 26 June 1921 by Giuseppe Gamba
- Consecration: 2 May 1954 by Gilla Vincenzo Gremigni

Personal details
- Born: Francesco Fasola; 23 February 1898 Maggiora, Novara, Kingdom of Italy
- Died: 1 July 1988 (aged 90) Novara, Italy
- Motto: Duc in altum ("launch into the deep")
- Coat of arms

Francesco Fasola (23 February 1898 – 1 July 1988) was an Italian member of the Congregatio Oblatorum Sanctorum Gaudentii et Caroli Novariae who served as the Archbishop of Messina from 1963 until his retirement in 1977. He served as a rector and parish priest after his ordination in Galliante before he was made a bishop in 1954 for the Agrigento diocese where he served as the coadjutor; he later was moved south to Caltagirone and then was made an archbishop. Fasola placed a particular emphasis during his episcopate on the renovation of ecclesial buildings and the ordination of new priests which was a sacrament he liked to bestow upon seminarians.

In 2005 the cause for the late archbishop launched in Messina and he became titled as a Servant of God.

== Life ==
Francesco Fasola was born in Maggiora in Novara on 23 February 1898 and was baptized the following morning in the Spirito Santo parish. The fragile economic condition at the time forced his father to emigrate to the United States of America where he remained for a decade.

He commenced his ecclesial studies on the Isola San Giulio in Lake Orta and then in Arona. Giuseppe Gamba elevated him to the diaconate on 26 May 1921 in Novara and then in the chapel of the Novara episcopal residence ordained him to the priesthood on 26 June. Fasola's spiritual director throughout the course of his studies was the Venerable Silvio Gallotti.

He was sent to Galliante after his ordination to commence his pastoral duties while later in 1929 he became the vicar for the San Giuseppe church in Novara. In 1942 he became the rector for Sacro Monte di Varallo and later in 1946 became the pro-vicar general for the Novara diocese.

Fasola was made a bishop on 8 March 1954 after Pope Pius XII named him to be the coadjutor for the Agrigento diocese (and as a titular bishop); he received his episcopal consecration in Novara on 2 May from Gilla Vincenzo Gremigni while the principal co-consecrators were the archbishops Giovanni Battista Peruzzo and Guido Tonetti. He was reluctant to accept his new position as a coadjutor much less as a bishop in general; he arrived in Agrigento to commence his pastoral duties there on 20 June 1954. He made two pastoral visits during his time as coadjutor and also worked for the renovation of the diocesan museum in addition to ensuring the refurbishment of churches. Fasola later received a letter on 19 August 1960 that informed him that he was to become the Bishop of Caltagirone which was formalized when Pope John XXIII appointed him to the position on 11 November 1960. He was enthroned in his new see on 21 January 1961. Fasola attended all five sessions of the Second Vatican Council that John XXIII opened in late 1962. In 1963 he learnt from the Sacred Consistorial Congregation in Rome that he would soon be appointed as the Archbishop of Messina. He travelled to Rome to persuade the officials there otherwise but was nonetheless appointed as such on 25 June 1963 after the election of Pope Paul VI. He was enthroned in his new archdiocese on 15 September 1963.

Fasola liked to ordain new priests and often celebrated ordinations on the liturgical feast of Saint Jean-Baptiste-Marie Vianney. Fasola later entered the Oblati dei Santi Gaudenzio e Carlo and made his initial profession on 17 October 1974 before making his solemn profession later on 10 November 1976. In 1973, upon turning 75, he submitted his mandated resignation to Pope Paul VI but overall sent five letters requesting resignation. The pope accepted this on 3 June 1977 and Fasola celebrated his last Mass as the see's archbishop on 9 July. He left Messina on 16 July 1977 to return to Sacro Monte di Varallo to spend his retirement.

He arrived at Sacro Monte di Varallo on 30 July 1977 after having stopped in Pompeii and Alatri in addition to making a brief detour to Rome. He also travelled to Bologna and Lucca before arriving at his destination where he spent his retirement reading and addressing correspondence. But the weakening of his health forced him to move to Novara for treatment where he celebrated his final Mass on 26 June 1988.

Fasola died in Novara on 1 July 1988 at 3:57 pm; his remains were interred in the Messina Cathedral.

== Beatification process ==
The beatification process opened on 30 September 2005 after the Congregation for the Causes of Saints issued the official nihil obstat (no objections) edict and titled Fasola as a Servant of God. The diocesan process opened in the Messina-Lipari-Santa Lucia del Mela archdiocese on 31 March 2006 and is ongoing.
