= Giuseppe Migliaccio =

Italian Roman Catholic prelate (1658–1729)

Most Reverend Giuseppe Migliaccio
- Archbishop of Messina
- Church: Catholic Church
- Archdiocese: Archdiocese of Messina
- In office: 1698–1729
- Predecessor: Francisco Alvarez de Quiñones
- Successor: Tomás Vidal y de Nin
- Previous post: Bishop of Patti (1693–1698)

Orders
- Consecration: 24 May 1693

Personal details
- Born: 31 March 1658 Montemaggiore, Italy
- Died: 25 March 1729 (age 70) Messina, Italy

Giuseppe Migliaccio (1658–1729) was a Roman Catholic prelate who served as Archbishop of Messina (1698–1729) and Bishop of Patti (1693–1698).

== Biography ==
Giuseppe Migliaccio was born in Montemaggiore, Italy on 31 March 1658. On 18 May 1693, he was appointed during the papacy of Pope Innocent XII as Bishop of Patti. On 24 May 1693, he was consecrated bishop by Galeazzo Marescotti, Cardinal-Priest of Santi Quirico e Giulitta, with Prospero Bottini, Titular Archbishop of Myra, and Lorenzo Corsini, Titular Archbishop of Nicomedia, serving as co-consecrators. On 24 November 1698, he was appointed during the papacy of Pope Innocent XII as Archbishop of Messina. He served as Archbishop of Messina until his death on 25 March 1729.

== External links and additional sources ==
- Cheney, David M. "Diocese of Patti". Catholic-Hierarchy.org. (for Chronology of Bishops) ^{[self-published]}
- Chow, Gabriel. "Diocese of Patti". GCatholic.org. (for Chronology of Bishops) ^{[self-published]}
- Cheney, David M. "Archdiocese of Messina-Lipari-Santa Lucia del Mela". Catholic-Hierarchy.org. (for Chronology of Bishops) ^{[self-published]}
- Chow, Gabriel. "Archdiocese of Messina-Lipari-Santa Lucia del Mela". GCatholic.org. (for Chronology of Bishops) ^{[self-published]}

Catholic Church titles
Preceded by Matteo Fazio	Bishop of Patti; 1693–1698	Succeeded by Francesco Girgenti
Preceded by Francisco Alvarez de Quiñones	Archbishop of Messina; 1698–1729	Succeeded by Tomás Vidal y de Nin
