= Battle of Tyndaris =

Naval battle of the First Punic War

- Part of the First Punic War
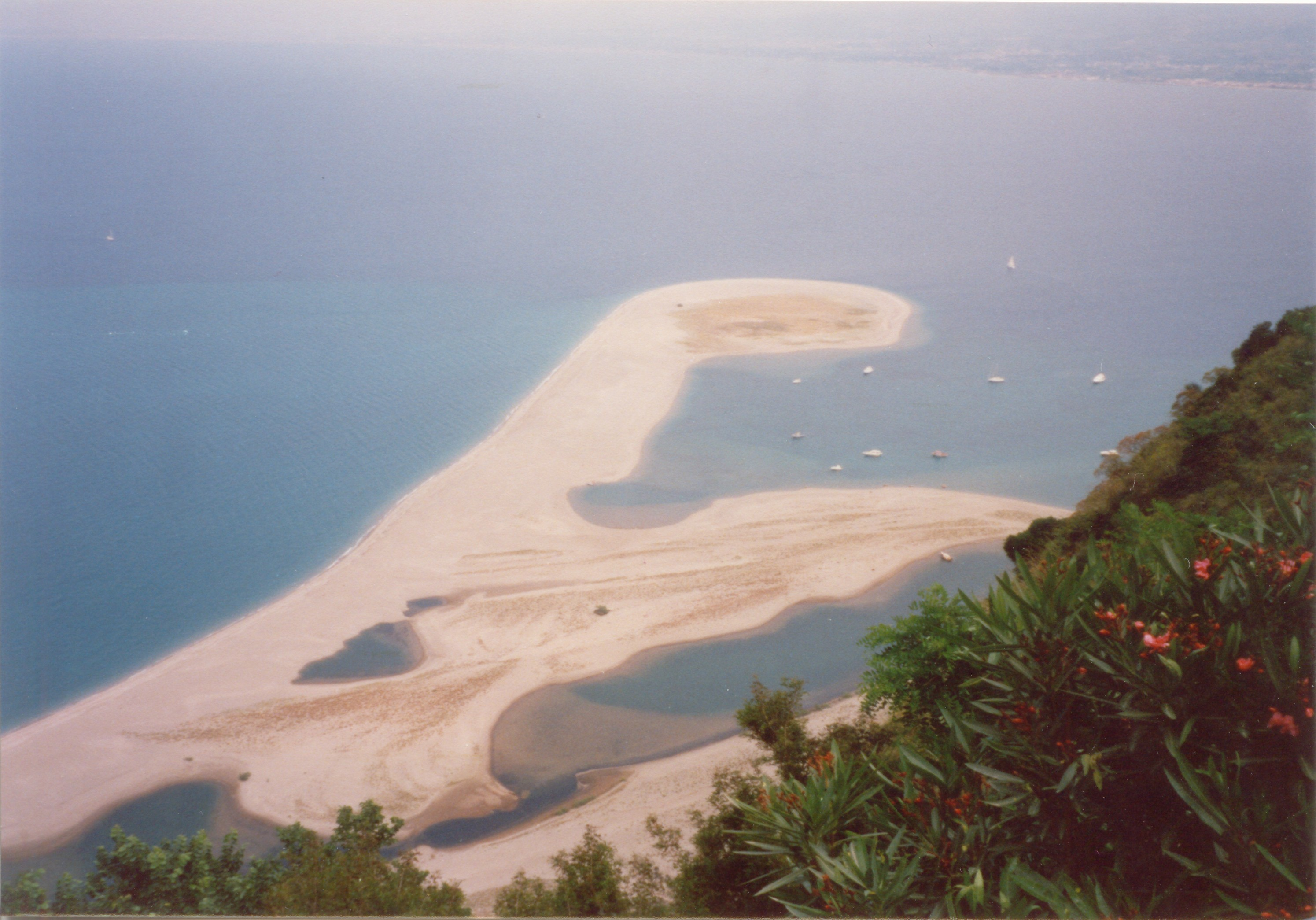
- Lagoon and coast of Tindari
Date	257 BC
Location	Tindaris (modern Tindari), Sicily 38°8′44″N 15°2′23″E
Result	Roman victory

Belligerents
Rome	Carthage

Commanders and leaders
Gaius Atilius Regulus	Hamilcar

Strength
Unknown	Unknown

Casualties and losses
9 ships sunk	18 ships 8 ships sunk 10 ships captured

The Battle of Tyndaris was a naval battle of the First Punic War that took place off Tyndaris (modern Tindari) in 257 BC. Tyndaris was a Sicilian town founded as a Greek colony in 396 BC located on the high ground overlooking the Tyrrhenian Sea in the Gulf of Patti. Hiero II, the tyrant of Syracuse, allowed Tyndaris to become a base for the Carthaginians. The battle took place in the waters between Tyndaris and the Aeolian Islands, with Gaius Atilius Regulus in command of the Roman fleet. Subsequently, the town fell to Rome.

== Battle ==
Gaius Atilius Regulus' fleet was anchored off Tyndaris when he observed the Carthaginian fleet sailing past, but not in a tactical formation. He gave orders for the main body of his ships to follow the leading ships. He then took an advance guard of ten ships and sailed towards the Carthaginians. The Carthaginians noticed that the advance guard had outdistanced the main body of the Roman fleet and that other Romans were still boarding their ships. Taking the initiative, the Carthaginians turned and engaged the Roman squadron and sank nine of the ships. Meanwhile, the rest of the Roman fleet arrived and formed a line. The Romans then engaged the Carthaginians, sinking eight and capturing ten of their ships. The remainder of the Carthaginian ships retreated to the Aeolian Islands.

This naval engagement was followed by the Battle of Cape Ecnomus.
