= Bonaventura Secusio =

Prelate of the Catholic Church in Italy (died 1618)

Most Reverend Bonaventura Secusio
- Patriarch (personal title) of Catania
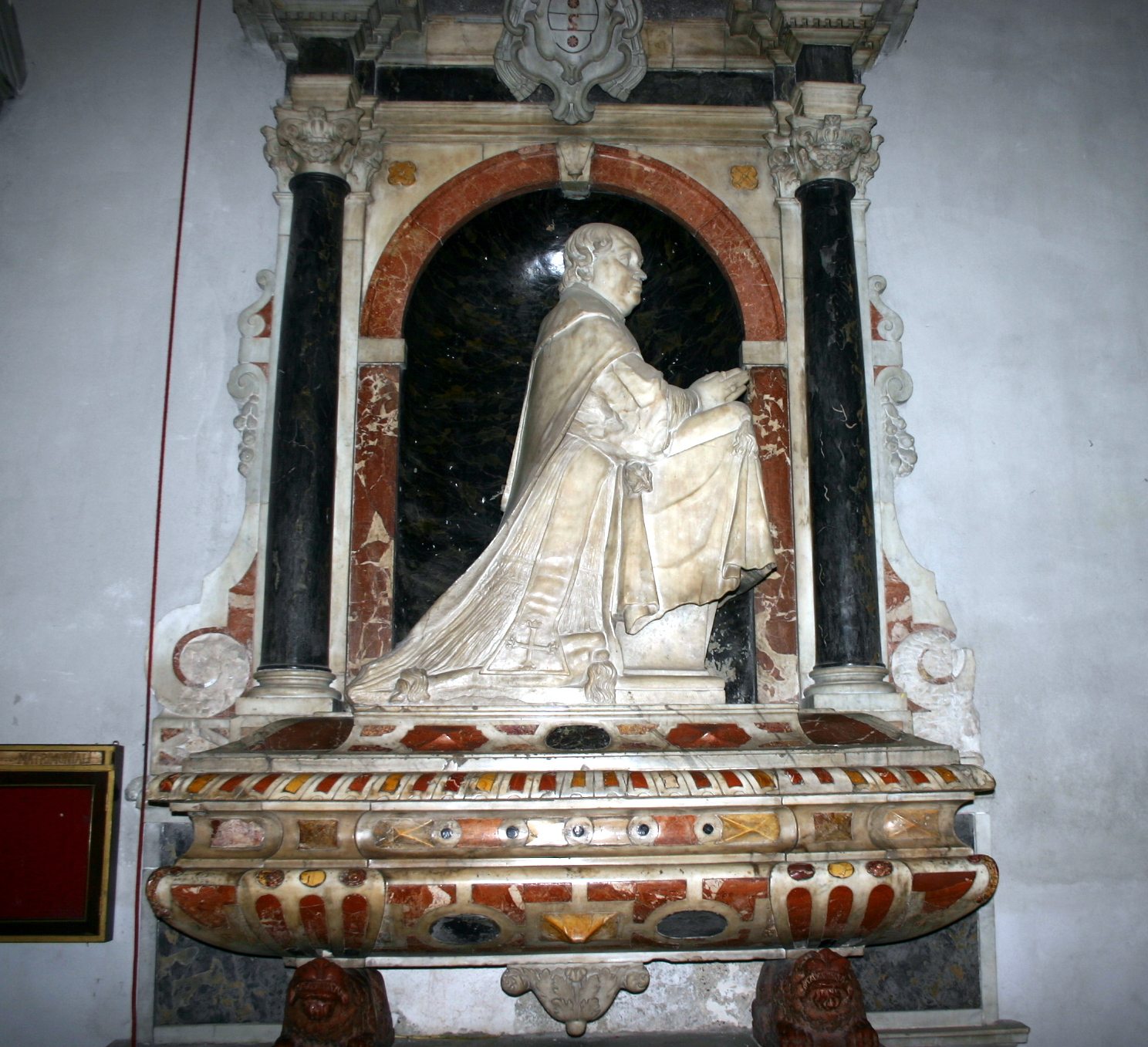
- Church: Catholic
- Diocese: Diocese of Catania
- In office: 1609–1618
- Predecessor: Juan Ruiz Villoslada
- Successor: Juan Torres de Osorio

Orders
- Consecration: 14 March 1599 by Alessandro Ottaviano de' Medici

Personal details
- Died: March 1618 Catania, Sicily

Bonaventura Secusio, O.F.M. Obs. (died March 1618) was a Catholic prelate who served as Bishop of Catania (1609–1618), Bishop of Messina (1605–1609), Bishop of Patti (1601–1605), the Latin Patriarch of Constantinople (1599–1618), and as Minister General of the Order of Observant Friars Minor (1593–1600).

== Biography ==
Bonaventura Secusio was ordained a priest in the Order of Friars Minor Observants. In 1593, he was appointed the Minister General of the Order of Observant Friars Minor. On 10 March 1599, he was appointed by Pope Clement VIII as Latin Patriarch of Constantinople and consecrated bishop on 14 March 1599 by Alessandro Ottaviano de' Medici, Archbishop of Florence with Fabio Blondus de Montealto, Latin Patriarch of Jerusalem, and Domenico Bolano, Bishop of Canea, serving as co-consecrators. In 1600, he resigned as Minister General of the Order of Observant Friars Minor. On 30 April 1601, he was appointed by Pope Clement VIII as Bishop of Patti. On 17 August 1605, he was appointed by Pope Paul V as Bishop of Messina. On 10 June 1609, he was appointed by Pope Paul V as Bishop of Catania where he served until his death in March 1618.

While bishop, he was the principal consecrator of Jean-François Berliet, Bishop of Tarentaise and the co-consecrator of Paolo Tolosa, Bishop of Bovino.

Catholic Church titles
Preceded by Bonifazio Bevilacqua Aldobrandini	Latin Patriarch of Constantinople; 1599–1601	Succeeded by Ascanio Gesualdo
Preceded by Gilberto Isfar y Corillas	Bishop of Patti; 1601–1605	Succeeded by Juan de Rada
Preceded by Francisco Velarde de la Cuenca	Bishop of Messina; 1605–1609	Succeeded by Pedro Ruiz Valdivieso
Preceded by Juan Ruiz Villoslada	Bishop of Catania; 1609–1618	Succeeded by Juan Torres de Osorio
