= Diocese of Patti =

Roman Catholic diocese in Italy

Coordinates: 38.1333°N 14.9667°E

Diocese of Patti Dioecesis Pactensis

Catholic
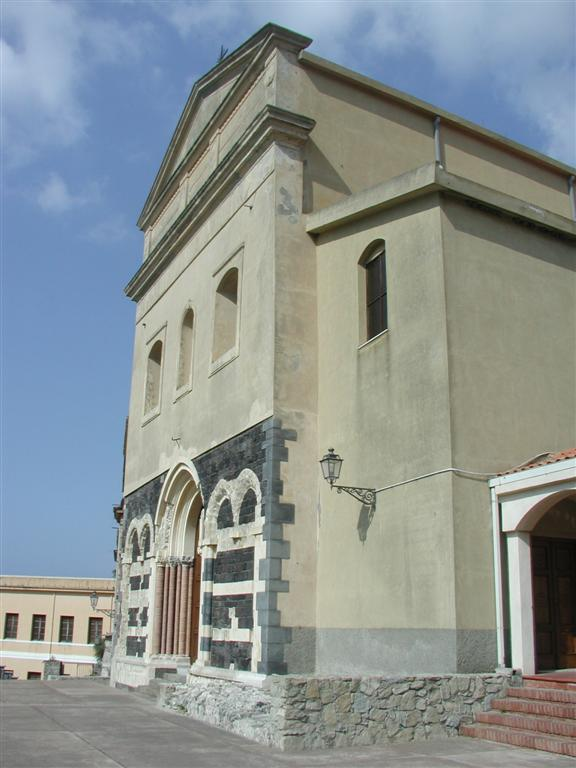
- Patti Cathedral

Location
- Country: Italy
- Ecclesiastical province: Messina-Lipari-Santa Lucia del Mela

Statistics
- Area: 1,648 km^{2} (636 sq mi)
- Population: Total; Catholics: (as of 2023); 166,270 (est.) ▼; 161,170 (est.) ▼ (97.0%)
- Parishes: 84

Information
- Denomination: Catholic
- Sui iuris church: Latin Church
- Rite: Roman Rite
- Established: 12th century
- Cathedral: Cattedrale di S. Bartolomeo
- Secular priests: 100 ▼

Current leadership
- Pope: Leo XIV
- Bishop: Giglielmo Giombanco
- Bishops emeritus: Ignazio Zambito

Map
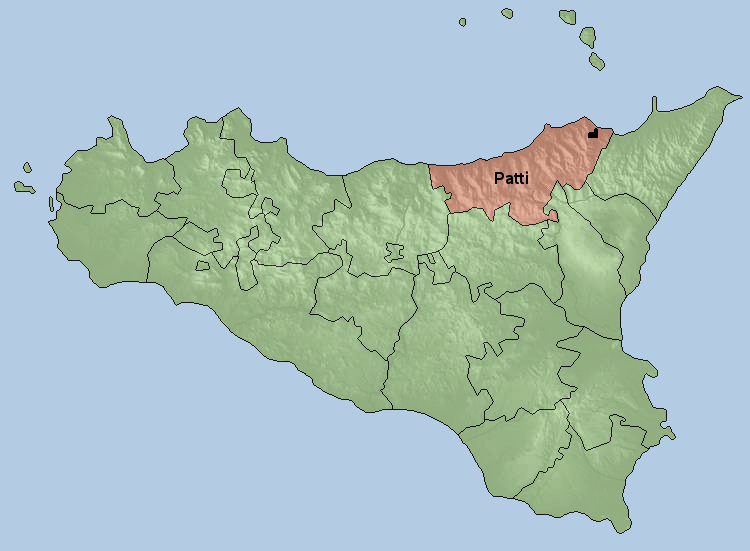

Website
- diocesipatti.it

The Diocese of Patti (Latin: Dioecesis Pactensis) is a Latin diocese of the Catholic Church located on the north shore of the island of Sicily. It is a suffragan of the Archdiocese of Messina-Lipari-Santa Lucia del Mela. Its patron saint is Bartholomew the Apostle, in whose honor the cathedral is named.

== Geography ==
The diocese includes the city of Patti and 41 other communes of the civil province of Messina. The natural borders of the diocese are the Tyrrhenian Belt which goes from Oliveri to Tusa, for a length of about 102 kilometres, and the Nebrodi mountain range.

== History ==
=== Diocese of Tyndaris ===
The diocese of Patti had an ancient precursor, the diocese of Tyndaris, now a small hamlet on the Tyrrhenian Sea 7 km east of Patti. Four of its bishops are known by name:

- Severinus (501)
- Eutychius (593)
- Benenatus (599)
- Theodorus (649).

The Emperor Leo III the Isaurian (717–741) removed the dioceses of Sicily, including Tyndaris, from Roman control and made them suffragans of the Ecumenical Patriarchate of Constantinople, and immediately subject to the metropolitan of Syracuse. In the mid-9th (or 10th) century, Basil of Ialimbana revised the geography of George of Cyprus with the addition of a Notitia episcopuum, in which the diocese appears as a suffragan of Syracuse.

=== Patti ===
The importance of Patti grew, however, when Duke Robert Guiscard and Count Roger I founded on the island of Lipari Patti a Benedictine abbey, dedicated to Saint Bartholomew, in c. 1085; the abbey was joined to the Abbey of S. Salvatore when it was founded in 1094.

On 14 September 1131 Anacletus II, the pope from the double election of 1130 who was recognized in Rome and in the Kingdom of Sicily, made the monastery of S. Bartholomew in Patti an episcopal see, and at the same time made the Abbey of Lipari an episcopal seat, uniting them in the person of one bishop, who would be suffragan of and consecrated by the Archbishop of Messana. The new See was endowed by King Roger II of Sicily, making it richer than the long established See of Syracuse. Pope Eugenius III in 1157 confirmed the action of Anacletus II.

Pope Lucius III, in 1183 and again in 1184, confirmed the subordination of the dioceses of Cefalù and Patti to the archbishopric of Messina.

In 1206, it lost territory to establish the territorial prelature of Santa Lucia del Mela.

In October 1229, the Emperor Frederick II, on the petition of Bishop Paganus of Patti, confirmed all the possessions and privileges of the diocese.

==== Chapter and cathedral ====
The Cathedral of S. Bartolommeo in Patti was originally served by Benedictine monks, down to 1649, who came to form the cathedral Chapter. It originally consisted of five dignities (the Prior, the Archdeacon, the Cantor, the Treasurer, and the Sacristan) and eight canons. In 1604, Bishop Bonaventura Secusio, in the belief that the number of canons was too small for the dignity of his cathedral, added two more canons. The cathedral Chapter was secularized in 1649, by a decree of Pope Innocent X. Later, in 1693, it had a Chapter consisting of five dignities and nine canons; in 1753, the number of canons had grown to eighteen.

Frederick III of Sicily (1295–1337) devastated Patti because the town was a supporter of his Angevin rivals, Robert and Philip of Naples. The French Pope John XXII, who supported the Angevins, laid all of Sicily under an interdict, which lasted from 1321 to 1335, causing severe problems between the Sicilian episcopate and the monarchy.

On 18 April 1399, Lipari and Patti were separated, and the first bishop of the separate see of Patti was Francesco Hermemir. His predecessor, Francesco Gaptulus, continued as Bishop of Lipari.

The diocese was small, having only five communities in it besides the capital. In 1416, the city of Patti is recorded as having a population of 2682. The entire diocese had 8,986 inhabitants.

==== Synods ====
In 1536, Bishop Arnaldo Albertini (1534–1544) held a diocesan synod. Bishop Bartolomé Sebastián de Aroitia (1549–1567) held a diocesan synod on 26 January 1567. On 27–28 August 1584, Bishop Gilberto Isfar y Corillas (1579–1600) presided over a diocesan synod in the cathedral of Saint Bartholomew in Patti. Bishop Matteo Fazio, O.P. (1682–1692) held a diocesan synod on 30 November–2 December 1687, and published the constitutions.

==== Seminary ====
Following the conclusion of the Council of Trent in 1563, King Philip II of Spain, who was also king of Sicily, ordered the implementation of its decrees, in particular for the establishment of seminaries. He ordered his royal Visitor, Francisco Puteo, to carry out his order, which the Visitor conveyed to the Church of Patti. The bishop obeyed the mandates, and began the erection. On 15 March 1588, the king assigned the revenues of the feud of Rocca and of Valdina to the seminary. Grdually the seminary received additions from various donors, to the sum of 144 ounces.

At the Visitation of 1742, it was recorded that the seminary Rector was a Dominican, and that there were eleven clerical seminarians from the diocese and eight from outside the diocese. In addition to the liberal arts, the curriculum included civil law and canon law, liturgy, singing (chant), ecclesistical history, and "computi ecclesistici."

On 20 May 1844 the diocese exchanged territory with the bishopric of Cefalù.

The diocese had in the early 20th century 49 parishes, 20,000 inhabitants, 5 religious houses of men, and 15 of sisters, conducting 4 institutes for girls and several schools.

Pope John Paul II visited the diocese in June 1988.

The church of the Santuario Maria Santissima di Tindari was granted the rank and privileges of a "minor basilica" in 2018 by Pope Francis.

== See also ==
- Diocese of Lipari
- Territorial Prelature of Santa Lucia del Mela

== Bishops ==
=== Diocese of Patti ===
Erected: 12th century

...

- Gilibertus (1157 – 1166)
- Stephanus (1180 – 1199)
- Anselmus (c. 1208 – 12xx ?)
- Jacobus ( – 25 September 1225)
- Paganus (10 October 1229 – 3 March 1246)
- Philippus (attested 1250)
- Bartholomaeus de Lentino, O.P. (5 January 1254 – 1282)
- Pandulfus (25 February 1286 – 4 July 1290)
- Joannes, O.P. (1304 – 1342)
- Vincentius, O.Min. (27 November 1342 – 1346)
- Petrus de Teutonico, O.Min. (15 February 1346 – 21 January 1354)
- Petrus de Thomas, O.Carm. (1354 – 10 May 1359)
- Joannes Graphei, O.Min. (17 July 1360 – 1373)
- Ubertinus de Coriliono, O.Min. (28 November 1373 – 1386)
- Franciscus, O.P. (30 May 1386 – 18 March 1388)
- Ubertinus de Coriliono, O.Min. (restored, 16 May 1390 – 18 August 1397)
- Franciscus Gaptulus (18 December 1397 – 18 April 1399)

Separation of Patti and Lipari – 1399

- Franciscus Hermemir (12 May 1399 – 1400/1401)
- Paulus de Prato (18 July 1401 – 26 June 1402)
- Philippus de Ferrerio, O.Carm. (8 July 1402 – 4 July 1414) (8 July 1402 – 4 July 1414)

...

- Giovanni Notarbartolo (3 Oct 1435 – 1437)
- Giacomo Porzio (1437–1449)

...

- Giacomo di Santa Lucia, O.F.M. (7 Jul 1480 – 1482)
- Giacomo Antonio Leofanti (9 Feb 1486 – 1494)
- Giovanni Marquet, O.P. (16 Jun 1494 – 1499)

=== from 1500 to 1800 ===
- Miguel Figueroa (bishop) (4 Sep 1500 – 10 May 1517 Died)
- Francisco de Urríes (Verreis) (21 Jun 1518 – 8 Jun 1534)
- Arnau Alberti (Arnaldo Albertini) (12 Sep 1534 – 7 Oct 1544 Died)
- Girolamo Sigismondi (14 Dec 1545 – 1548 Died)
- Bartolomé Sebastián de Aroitia (9 Jan 1549 – 1 Oct 1567
- Antonio Rodríguez de Pazos y Figueroa (17 Sep 1568 – 29 Oct 1578 Resigned)
- Gilberto Isfar y Corillas (23 Jan 1579 – 15 Apr 1600 Died)
- Bonaventura Secusio, O.F.M. Obs. (30 Apr 1601 – 17 Aug 1605)
- Juan de Rada, O.F.M. (16 Jan 1606 – Jan 1609 Died)
- Vincenzo Napoli (2 Dec 1609 – 23 Aug 1648 Died)
- Ludovico Ridolfi (19 Jul 1649 – 28 Oct 1649 Died)
- Luc Cochiglia (27 Feb 1651 – 1653 Died)
- Luis Alfonso de Los Cameros (12 Jan 1654 – 16 Oct 1656)
- Simone Rau e Requesens (8 Jul 1658 – 20 Sep 1659 Died)
- Ignazio d'Amico (31 Jul 1662 – 15 Dec 1666 Appointed, Bishop of Agrigento)
- Giovanni Antonio Geloso (17 Jun 1669 – 3 Nov 1669)
- Vincenzo Maffia, O.P. (20 Apr 1671 – 16 Nov 1674 Died)
- Antonio Bighetti (28 Mar 1678 – May 1678 Died)
- Francesco Martinelli (bishop), C.O. (22 Jan 1680 – 3 Apr 1681 Died)
- Matteo Fazio, O.P. (26 Jan 1682 – 6 Sep 1692 Died)
- Giuseppe Migliaccio (18 May 1693 – 24 Nov 1698 Appointed, Archbishop of Messina)
- Francesco Girgenti, C.O. (11 Apr 1699 – 25 Sep 1701 Died)
- Ettore Algaria (17 Dec 1703 – 24 Jul 1713 Died)
- Pietro Galletti (30 Aug 1723 – 28 Nov 1729 Appointed, Bishop of Catania)
- Giacomo Bonanno, C.R. (5 May 1734 – 28 May 1753)
- Giovanni Girolamo Gravina, C.R. (10 Dec 1753 – 17 Apr 1755 Died)
- Carlo Mineo (16 Feb 1756 – 7 Sep 1771 Died)
- Salvatore Pisani (14 Dec 1772 – 14 May 1781 Died)
- Raimondo Moncada, C.R. (25 Feb 1782 – 18 Sep 1813 Died)

=== Since 1800 ===
- Silvestro Todaro, O.F.M. Conv. (22 Jul 1816 – 21 Apr 1821)
- Nicolò Gatto (17 Nov 1823 – 31 Dec 1831 Died)
- Giuseppe Saitta (30 Sep 1833 – 20 Jun 1838 Died)
- Martino Ursino (Orsino) (25 Jul 1844 – 8 Feb 1860 Died)
- Michelangelo Celesia, O.S.B. (23 Mar 1860 – 27 Oct 1871)
- Ignazio Carlo Vittore Papardo del Parco, C.R. (27 Oct 1871 – 22 Nov 1874 Died)
- Giuseppe Maria Maragioglio, O.F.M. Cap. (15 Mar 1875 – 20 Jan 1888 Died)
- Giovanni Previtera (Privitera) (1 Jun 1888 – 14 Feb 1903 Died)
- Francesco Maria Traina (22 Jun 1903 – 18 Nov 1911 Died)
- Ferdinando Fiandaca (10 Apr 1912 – 1 Aug 1930 Resigned)
- Antonio Mantiero (26 Sep 1931 – 24 Aug 1936 Appointed, Bishop of Treviso)
- Angelo Ficarra (12 Oct 1936 – 2 Aug 1957 Resigned)
- Giuseppe Pullano (2 Aug 1957 – 30 Nov 1977 Died)
- Carmelo Ferraro (30 Mar 1978 – 3 Nov 1988 Appointed, Bishop of Agrigento)
- Ignazio Zambito (12 May 1989 – 1 February 2017)
- Giglielmo Giombanco (1 February 2017 – )

== Sources ==
=== Reference works ===
- Eubel, Conradus, ed. (1913). Hierarchia catholica (in Latin). Vol. 1 (Tomus 1) (second ed.). Münster: Libreria Regensbergiana. pp. 181–182.. Archived.
- Eubel, Conradus, ed. (1914). Hierarchia catholica (in Latin). Vol. 2 (Tomus 2) (second ed.). Münster: Libreria Regensbergiana. p. 125.. Archived.
- Eubel, Conradus, ed. (1923). Hierarchia catholica (in Latin). Vol. 3 (Tomus 3) (second ed.). Münster: Libreria Regensbergiana. p. 163.. Archived.
- Gams, Pius Bonifatius (1873). Series episcoporum Ecclesiae catholicae: quotquot innotuerunt a beato Petro apostolo. Ratisbon: Typis et Sumptibus Georgii Josephi Manz. p. 953. (Use with caution; obsolete)
- Gauchat, Patritius (Patrice) (1935). Hierarchia catholica (in Latin). Vol. 4 (IV) (1592-1667). Münster: Libraria Regensbergiana.
- Ritzler, Remigius; Sefrin, Pirminus (1952). Hierarchia catholica medii et recentis aevi (in Latin). Vol. 5 (V) (1667-1730). Patavii: Messagero di S. Antonio.
- Ritzler, Remigius; Sefrin, Pirminus (1958). Hierarchia catholica medii et recentis aevi (in Latin). Vol. 6 (1730-1799). Patavii: Messagero di S. Antonio.
- Ritzler, Remigius; Sefrin, Pirminus (1968). Hierarchia Catholica medii et recentioris aevi (in Latin). Vol. 7 (1800–1846). Monasterii: Libr. Regensburgiana.
- Ritzler, Remigius; Sefrin, Pirminus (1978). Hierarchia catholica Medii et recentioris aevi (in Latin). Vol. 8 (1846–1903). Il Messaggero di S. Antonio.
- Pięta, Zenon (2002). Hierarchia catholica medii et recentioris aevi (in Latin). Vol. 9 (1903–1922). Padua: Messagero di San Antonio. ISBN 978-88-250-1000-8.

=== Studies ===
- Cappelletti, Giuseppe (1870). Le chiese d'Italia dalla loro origine sino ai nostri giorni (in Italian). Vol. vigesimoprimo (21). Venezia: Antonelli. pp. 581–587.
- D'Avino, Vincenzio (1848). Cenni storici sulle chiese arcivescovili, vescovili, e prelatizie (nullius) del regno delle due Sicilie (in Italian). Naples: dalle stampe di Ranucci. pp. 535–536. [Article by Antonio Busacca]
- De Ciocchis, Giovanni Angelo (1743). Sacrae regiae visitationis per Siciliam a Joanne-Ang. De Ciocchis, Caroli III. regis jussu acta decretaque omnia: Vol II: Vallis Nemorum, (in Latin) Palermo: Ex typographia Diarii literarii, 1836.
- Giardina, Noccolo (1888). Patti e la cronacs del suo vescovato. (in Italian). Siena 1888.
- Girgensohn, D. & N. Kamp, "Urkunden und Inquisitionen des 12. und 13. Jahrhunderts aus Patti," (in German) in: Quellen und Forschungen 45 (1965), pp. 1-240.
- Kehr, Paul Fridolin, et al. (1975). Italia Pontificia (in Latin), Vol. X: Calabria – Insulae (Turici: Weidmann 1975), pp. 355-361.
- Lanzoni, Francesco (1927). Le diocesi d'Italia dalle origini al principio del secolo VII (an. 604) (in Italian). Rome: Biblioteca Apostolica Vaticana. p. 650.
- Rodriquez, Carlo "Breve cenno storico sulla Chiesa Liparese," Giornale di scienze, letteratura ed arti per la Sicilia (in Italian). Vol. 75. 1841. pp. 33–66.
- Savagnone, F. Guglielmo (1912). "Concili e sinodi di Sicilia," (in Italian), in: Atti della reale Accademia di scienze, lettere e belle arti di Palermo terza serie, Vol. 9. Palermo: Impresa generale d'Affissione e Publicità, 1912. pp. 3-212 + Appendice.
- Sciacca, Giovanni Crisostomo (1907). Piatti e l'amministrazione del comune nel Medio Evo. (in Italian). [Documenti per servire alla storia di Sicilia, serie 2, vol. 6]. Palermo: "Boccone del Povero, 1907.
- Sciacca, Giovanni Crisostomo (2004). Fonti per una storia di Tindari e Patti: dal mito ai corsari (in Italian). Rome: L'Erma di Bretschneider. ISBN 978-88-8265-263-0.
- Pirro, Rocco (1733). Antonino Mongitore (ed.). Sicilia sacra disquisitionibus et notitiis illustrata. Vol. Tomus secundus (third ed.). haeredes P. Coppulae. pp. 770–796.
