= Francisco de Urríes =

Roman Catholic prelate

Most Reverend Francisco de Urríes
- Bishop of Urgell
- Church: Catholic Church
- Diocese: Diocese of Urgell
- In office: 1534–1551
- Predecessor: Pedro Jordán de Urríes
- Successor: Miguel Puig
- Previous post: Bishop of Patti (1518–1534)

Personal details
- Born: Huesca, Aragon
- Died: 26 October 1551 Urgell, Catalonia

Francisco de Urríes or Francisco de Verreis (died 26 October 1551) was a Roman Catholic prelate who served as Bishop of Urgell (1534–1551), Co-prince of Andorra (1534 - 1551) and Bishop of Patti (1518–1534).

== Biography ==
He was the son of the barons of Ayerbe. He was born in Huesca, Aragon. He was active in the diocese of Urgell in the 1510s. He lived outside the diocese of Urgell, so he appointed two bishops who led the bishopric: Baltasar de Heredia (1535 - 1540) and Joan Punyet (1550 - 1551). On 21 June 1518, he was appointed by Pope Leo X as Bishop of Patti. On 8 June 1534, he was appointed by Pope Clement VII as Bishop of Urgell. He served as Bishop of Urgell until his death on 26 October 1551. While bishop, he was the principal co-consecrator of Martín Pérez de Ayala, Archbishop of Valencia (1548).

He celebrated two synods in 1542 and 1545.

Some sources say he died in Urgell, while others say it was Ayerbe, where he spent a lot of time. He was buried in Ayerbe in 1551.

== External links and additional sources ==
- Cheney, David M. "Diocese of Patti". Catholic-Hierarchy.org. (for Chronology of Bishops) ^{[self-published]}
- Chow, Gabriel. "Diocese of Patti". GCatholic.org. (for Chronology of Bishops) ^{[self-published]}

Catholic Church titles
Preceded by Miguel Figueroa (bishop)	Bishop of Patti; 1518–1534	Succeeded by Arnau Alberti
Preceded by Pedro Jordán de Urríes	Bishop of Urgell; 1534–1551	Succeeded by Miguel Puig
