= Ignazio Cannavò =

Roman Catholic Bishop (1921–2015)

- Archbishop of the Archdiocese of Messina-Lipari-Santa Lucia del Mela
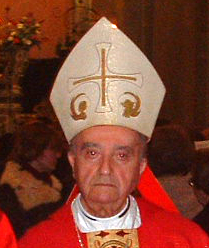
- Ignazio Cannavo
- Church: Roman Catholic Church
- See: Roman Catholic Archdiocese of Messina-Lipari-Santa Lucia del Mela
- In office: 1977 - 1997
- Predecessor: Francesco Fasola
- Successor: Giovanni Marra
- Previous post: Prelate

Orders
- Ordination: 5 November 1944

Personal details
- Born: 12 December 1921 Fiumefreddo di Sicilia, Italy
- Died: 18 October 2015 (aged 93) Aci Sant'Antonio

Ignazio Cannavò (Italian pronunciation: [iɲˈɲattsjo kannaˈvɔ]; 12 December 1921 – 18 October 2015) was an Italian Prelate of Roman Catholic Church.

Cannavò was born in Fiumefreddo di Sicilia, Italy and was ordained a priest on 5 November 1944. He was appointed auxiliary bishop of the Diocese of Acireale as well as titular bishop of Octava on 31 October 1970 and ordained on 13 December 1970. Cannavò was appointed Coadjutor archbishop of the Diocese of Messina on 21 February 1976 and prelate of Santa Lucia del Mela on 21 December 1976. Cannavò succeeded as archbishop of the Diocese of Messina on 3 June 1977. He was appointed bishop of the diocese of Lipari on 10 December 1977. Cannavò was appointed to the newly created archdiocese of Messina-Lipari-Santa Lucia del Mela on 30 September 1986 and retired on 17 May 1997.
