= Francesco Sgalambro =

Italian Roman Catholic bishop

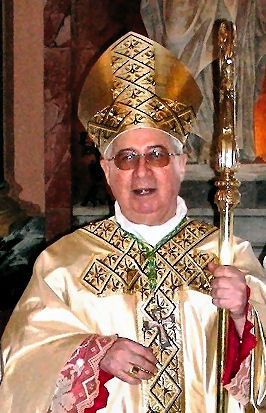
Francesco Sgalambro

Francesco Sgalambro (16 April 1934 – 11 August 2016) was an Italian Roman Catholic bishop.

Ordained to the priesthood in 1957, Sgalambro served as an auxiliary bishop from 1986 to 2000 and then served as the bishop of the Roman Catholic Diocese of Cefalù from 2000 to 2009.

== See also ==
- Catholic Church in Italy
