= Archdiocese of Messina-Lipari-Santa Lucia del Mela =

Roman Catholic archdiocese in Italy

Coordinates: 38.1833°N 15.5500°E

Archdiocese of Messina-Lipari-Santa Lucia del Mela Archidioecesis Messanensis-Liparensis-Sanctae Luciae

Catholic
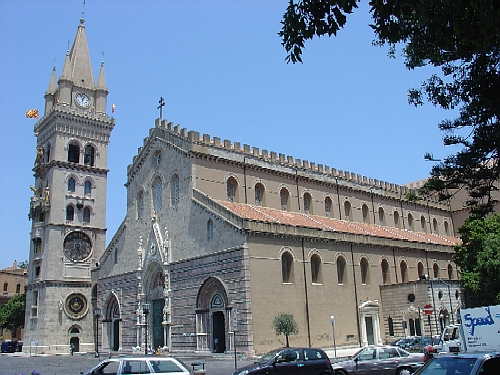
- Cathedral of the Assumption in Messina

Location
- Country: Italy
- Ecclesiastical province: Messina-Lipari-Santa Lucia del Mela

Statistics
- Area: 1,848 km^{2} (714 sq mi)
- Population: Total; Catholics: (as of 2021); 490,000 (est.) ▼; 480,000 (est.) ▼
- Parishes: 247

Information
- Denomination: Catholic Church
- Rite: Roman Rite
- Established: 1st century
- Cathedral: Basilica Cattedrale di S. Maria SS. Assunta (Messina)
- Co-cathedral: Concattedrale Archimandritato del Santissimo Salvatore (Messina); Concattedrale di S. Bartolomeo (Lipari); Concattedrale di S. Maria Assunta (Santa Lucia del Mela)
- Secular priests: 217 (diocesan) ▼120 (religious Orders); 82 (Permanent Deacons)

Current leadership
- Pope: Leo XIV
- Archbishop: Giovanni Accolla
- Auxiliary Bishops: Cesare Di Pietro
- Bishops emeritus: Calogero La Piana, S.D.B.

Map
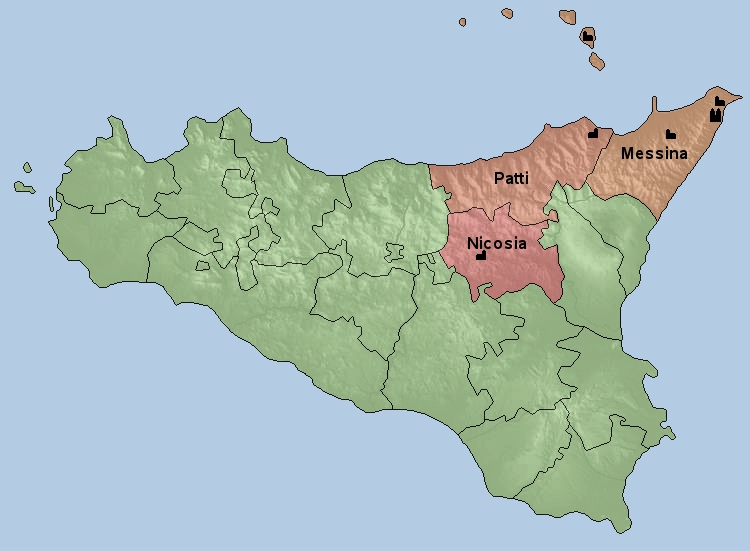

Website
- www.diocesimessina.it

The Archdiocese of Messina (Latin: Archidioecesis Messanensis-Liparensis-Sanctae Luciae) is a Latin archdiocese of the Catholic Church. It was founded as the Diocese of Messina but was raised to the level of an archdiocese on 30 September 1986 with the merging with the former Diocese of Lipari (5th century) and the Territorial Prelature of Santa Lucia del Mela (1206), and as suffragans the Diocese of Patti and Diocese of Nicosia.

== History ==
In the war between King Charles II of Naples and Frederick III of Sicily for the crown of Sicily, Messana supported Frederick, even under attack by the fleet of Charles in 1298. Sicily was under papal interdict because it rejected the candidate supported by the Pope.

Canon Antonio Amico wrote extensively on the history of Messina in the seventeenth century.

Messina has the misfortune of being situated on a major tectonic plate boundary, between the European plate and the African plate. On 11 January 1693, a major earthquake struck the eastern coast of Sicily from Messina to Syracuse; twenty-nine people died, and destruction extended to the Royal Palace, the Episcopal Palace, the Seminary, and there was severe damage to the Church of S. Francesco. The bell towers of the cathedral and the church of SS. Anunziata were destroyed. In February 1783, Messina was stricken by a major destructive earthquake. At least 617 persons died in the city. The cathedral, Episcopal Palace, seminary, a large part of the hospital, most of the palazzi in the Teatro Maritima, and convents and monasteries (including the Certosa of S. Bruno and the Convent of S. Dominico Soriano) were damaged or destroyed. On 28 December 1908 a major earthquake struck Messina, destroying the cathedral, the seminary, and numerous other buildings. It is estimated that 91% of the buildings in Messina were destroyed. The quake was accompanied by a destructive tsunami. Some 75,000 people lost their lives.

=== Cathedral and Chapter ===
The new cathedral (built between 1909 and 1921) was again damaged by bombs and a fire during World War II. Like its predecessors, and like all of the cathedrals in the Kingdom of Naples, it was dedicated to the Assumption of the Body of the Virgin Mary into Heaven.

The Chapter of the Cathedral was founded by Count Roger Guiscard in the late 11th century, perhaps in 1091. The dignitaries of the Cathedral Chapter were: the Dean, the Cantor and the Archdeacon. The Dean is already attested in 1094, and held the first place after the Archbishop; he had one of the canonries annexed to his office. The Cantor also holds one of the canonries; a Cantor is attested in 1131. The Archdeacon, who is also known from 1094, holds the Canonry of S. Petrus Pisanorum. There were eighteen Canons, the first three of whom were the three dignities. Except for the canonry of the Dean, the canons and prebends were conferred alternately by the Pope and the Archbishop. There were also eighteen priests called 'Canonici tertiarii', who, however, did not belong to the Chapter.

=== San Salvatore ===
The most famous monastery in the diocese of Messina was that of the Holy Savior (S. Salvatoris, San Salvatore), which had been founded by the Norman Count Roger in 1059, and was under the leadership of Fr. Bartolomeo. The monks of that monastery followed the Rules of St. Basil. Their abbot bore the Greek title Archimandrite, and he acquired preeminence and control over all of the Basilian monks in Sicily and Calabria. The Archimandrite was elected by the monks. In 1421 the office was secularized, and given in commendam (caretakership) to secular prelates instead of monks. In a breve of 23 February 1635, Pope Urban VIII made the office immediately subject to the Holy See, and the pope of the day appointed the Archimandrite. In 1883 Pope Leo XIII united the office of Archimandrite with that of the Archbishop of Messina. The monastery was situated at the tip of the mole in the harbor of Messina, until the Emperor Charles V had the monks moved to a new building on the mainland and the monastery on the mole destroyed to make way for his lighthouse. The monastery was closed during the Revolution of 1848.

== Bishops of Messina ==
Bacchilus (41)]
Barchirius (68)]
Eleutherius (121)]
John I (151)]
Alexander I (154)]
Justinianus (183)]
Raimond
Capito (313)]
Alexander II (347)]
Evagrius (363)]
Bacchilus II (381)]

- Eucarpus I (501)
- Peregrinus I (514)
- Eucarpus II (attested 558–560)
- Felix I (attested 591, 593)
- Donus (attested 595–603)
- Felix II (600)
- Guglielmo I (603)
- Isidorus (610)

Peregrinus II (649)]

- Benedictus (682)
- Gaudiosus (787)
- Gregorius (869)

Ippolitus (968)]
Sede Vacante (under the Arab occupation)

- Roberto I (1081)
- Gaufridus (Goffredo) I (attested in 1113, 1122)
- Guglielmo II (c.1122 – c. 1126))
- Hugo (Ugone) (1127–1139)
- Gaufridus (Goffredo) II (attested 1140)
- Roberto II (attested 1142)
- Gerardus (attested 1144)
- Arnaldo (1147–?)
- Roberto III (attested 1151–1159)

== Archbishops of Messina ==
=== from 1166 to 1400 ===
- Nicolò I (1166–1182)
- Riccardo Palmieri (January 1183 - 7 August 1195)
- Berardo (Berzio) (1196 – 1227/1231)

Sede vacante (<1231 – 1232)

- Lando (Landone) (April 1232 – c. 1248)

Sede vacante

- Giovanni Colonna (archbishop), O.P. (October 1255 – 1262)
- Tommaso D'Agni Lentini, O.P. (1262 – 1266) (Administrator)
- Bartolomeo Pignatelli (25 March 1266 – 13 June 1270)

Sede vacante (13 June 1270 – 5 December 1274)

- Reginaldo Lentini (5 December 1274 – 31 May 1287)
- Francesco Fontana (23 April 1288 - 1296)

Raniero II Lentini (1296–1304)

- Guidotto de Abbiate (10 January 1304 – 1333)

Sede vacante (1333 – 1341/1342)

- Federico de Guercis (1341–1342) (Archbishop-elect)
- Raimando de Pezzolis (1342–1348)
- Giordano Curti (1348)
- Pietro Porta, O.Cist. (20 March 1349 – 1351?)

Anzalone Bonsignore

- Guglielmo Monstrio (23 December 1355 – 1362)
- Dionisio da Murcia, O.E.S.A. (20 March 1363 – after 18 July 1380)
- Cardinal Niccolò Caracciolo Moschino, O.P. (Apostolic Administrator 1380–1387)
- Paolo Zuccaro (1380–1387)
- Maffiolo Lampugnani (1387–1392) (Roman Obedience)

=== from 1400 to 1600 ===
- Filippo Crispi, O.E.S.A. (1392 – 1 December 1402)

[Pietro Budano (1403–?)]

- Tommaso Crisafi, O.F.M. (12 January 1403 – July 1426)

Archida Ventimiglia (1426 – 13 August 1428)

- Bartolomeo Gattola (14 October 1426 – 1446)

[Pietro III (1446–1447)]

- Cardinal Antonio Cerdà i Lloscos, O.SS.T. (8 January 1448 – 28 March 1449)
- Giacomo Porcio (21 April 1449 – 1450)

[Andrea Amodeo (1449–1450)]

- Giacomo Tedesco (4 November 1450 – 14 March 1473)

[Leontius Crisafi (1473)]

- Cardinal Giuliano della Rovere (1473 – 1474) (Administrator)
- Giacomo di Santa Lucia (23 May 1474 – 7 July 1480)
- Pietro de Luna (7 July 1480 – 1482; 28 August 1492)
- Martino Ponz (27 March 1493 – 1500)

Martino Garcia (4 December 1500–1501?)

- Pietro Belorado (Pedro Belorado) (16 March 1502 – 1509)

Cardinal Pietro Isvalies (Pietro Isvales) (1510 – 22 September 1511) (Administrator)

- Bernardino da Bologna (23 January 1512 – 1513)
- Antonio La Legname (24 April 1514 – 13 November 1537)
- Cardinal Innocenzo Cibo (Cybo) (14 June 1538 – 14 April 1550) (Administrator)
- Cardinal Giovanni Andrea Mercurio (30 May 1550 – 2 February 1561)
- Gaspar Cervantes de Gaeta (19 November 1561 – 1 March 1564), cardinal
- Antonio Cancellaro (28 April 1564 – 12 November 1568)
- Giovanni Retana (22 June 1569 – 15 May 1582)
- Antonio Lombardo (bishop) (23 January 1585 – 13 September 1597)
- Francisco Velarde de la Cuenca (1 February 1599 – 8 July 1604)

=== from 1600 to 1900 ===
- Bonaventura Secusio (1605–1609)
- Pedro Ruiz Valdivieso (1609–1617)
- Andrea Mastrillo (1618–1624)
- Giovanni Domenico Spinola (1624–1626), cardinal
- Biago Proto de Rubeis (20 July 1626 – 1646)
- Simone Carafa Roccella, C.R. (16 September 1647 – 1676)
- Giuseppe Cigala (Cicala), O.Theat. (9 May 1678 – 28 September 1685)
- Francisco Alvarez de Quiñones (27 May 1686 – 15 September 1698)
- Giuseppe Migliaccio (1698–1729)
- Tommaso Vidal y de Nin (1730–1743)
- Tommaso Moncada (1743–1762)
- Gabriele Maria Di Blasi e Gambacorta, O.S.B. (1764–1767)
- Giovanni Maria Spinelli, O.Theat. (1767–1770)

[Corrado Deodato Moncada (1770–1771)]

- Scipione Ardoino Alcontres, O.Theat. (17 June 1771 – 1778)
- Nicola Cifaglione (1778–1780)
- Francesco Paolo Perremuto (1790–1791)
- Gaetano Maria Garrasi, O.E.S.A. (1798–1817)
- Antonio Maria Trigona (1817–1819)
- Francesco di Paola Villadecani (1823–1861), cardinal
- Luigi Natoli (1867–1875)
- Giuseppe Guarino (1875–1897), cardinal
- Letterio D'Arrigo Ramondini (1898–1922)

=== since 1900 ===
- Angelo Paino (1923–1963)
- Guido Tonetti (1950–1957)
- Francesco Fasola (1963–1977)
- Ignazio Cannavò (1977–1997)

== Archbishops of Messina-Lipari-Santa Lucia del Mela ==
- Ignazio Cannavò (1986–1997)
- Giovanni Marra (1997–2006)
- Calogero La Piana, S.D.B. (2006–2015)
- Giovanni Accolla (2015– )

== See also ==
- Francesco Montenegro, native of Messina, former Auxiliary Bishop of Messina

== Bibliography ==
=== Reference works ===
- Eubel, Conradus, ed. (1913). Hierarchia catholica (in Latin). Vol. 1 (Tomus 1) (second ed.). Münster: Libreria Regensbergiana. pp. 181–182.. Archived.
- Eubel, Conradus, ed. (1914). Hierarchia catholica (in Latin). Vol. 2 (Tomus 2) (second ed.). Münster: Libreria Regensbergiana. p. 125.. Archived.
- Eubel, Conradus, ed. (1923). Hierarchia catholica (in Latin). Vol. 3 (Tomus 3) (second ed.). Münster: Libreria Regensbergiana. p. 163.. Archived.
- Gams, Pius Bonifatius (1873). Series episcoporum Ecclesiae catholicae: quotquot innotuerunt a beato Petro apostolo. Ratisbon: Typis et Sumptibus Georgii Josephi Manz. pp. 949-950. (Use with caution; obsolete)
- Gauchat, Patritius (Patrice) (1935). Hierarchia catholica (in Latin). Vol. 4 (IV) (1592-1667). Münster: Libraria Regensbergiana.
- Ritzler, Remigius; Sefrin, Pirminus (1952). Hierarchia catholica medii et recentis aevi (in Latin). Vol. 5 (V) (1667-1730). Patavii: Messagero di S. Antonio.
- Ritzler, Remigius; Sefrin, Pirminus (1958). Hierarchia catholica medii et recentis aevi (in Latin). Vol. 6 (1730-1799). Patavii: Messagero di S. Antonio.
- Ritzler, Remigius; Sefrin, Pirminus (1968). Hierarchia Catholica medii et recentioris aevi (in Latin). Vol. 7 (1800–1846). Monasterii: Libr. Regensburgiana.
- Ritzler, Remigius; Sefrin, Pirminus (1978). Hierarchia catholica Medii et recentioris aevi (in Latin). Vol. 8 (1846–1903). Il Messaggero di S. Antonio.
- Pięta, Zenon (2002). Hierarchia catholica medii et recentioris aevi (in Latin). Vol. 9 (1903–1922). Padua: Messagero di San Antonio. ISBN 978-88-250-1000-8.

=== Studies ===
- Backman, Clifford R. (2002). The Decline and Fall of Medieval Sicily: Politics, Religion, and Economy in the Reign of Frederick III, 1296-1337. Cambridge University Press. ISBN 978-0-521-52181-9.
- Cappelletti, Giuseppe (1870). Le chiese d'Italia dalla loro origine sino ai nostri giorni (in Italian). Vol. vigesimoprimo (21). Venezia: Antonelli.
- Kamp, Norbert (1975). Kirche und Monarchie im staufischen Königreich Sizilien: I. Prosopographische Grundlegung, Bistumer und Bischofe des Konigreichs 1194–1266: 3. Sizilien München: Wilhelm Fink 1975, pp. .
- Lancia di Brolo, Domenico Gaspare (1880). Storia della Chiesa in Sicilia nei dieci primi secoli del cristianesimo (in Italian). Vol. primo. Palermo: Stab. Tip. Lao. Volume secondo. 1880.
- Lanzoni, Francesco (1927). Le diocesi d'Italia dalle origini al principio del secolo VII (an. 604) (in Italian). Rome: Biblioteca Apostolica Vaticana.
- Morabito, Carolo (1669). Annalium Prothometropolitanae Messanensis Ecclesiæ ... tomus primus (in Latin). Vol. Tomus primus. Messana: Iosephus Bisagni.
- Pirro, Rocco (1733). Mongitore, Antonino (ed.). Sicilia sacra disquisitionibus et notitiis illustrata. Vol. Tomus primus (third ed.). Palermo: haeredes P. Coppulae. pp. 314–450.
- Savagnone, F. Guglielmo (1912). "Concili e sinodi di Sicilia," (in Italian), in: Atti della reale Accademia di scienze, lettere e belle arti di Palermo terza serie, Vol. 9. Palermo: Impresa generale d'Affissione e Publicità, 1912. pp. 3-212 + Appendice.
