= Patti, Sicily =

Patti Epaktì (Greek)
- Comune
- Comune di Patti
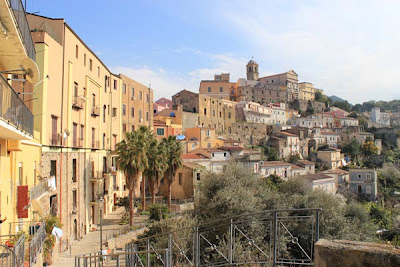
- View of the cathedral and historical centre

- Coat of arms

- Location within Italy Location within Sicily
- Coordinates: 38°8′20″N 14°57′55″E
- Country: Italy
- Region: Sicily
- Metropolitan city: Messina (ME)
- Frazioni: Tindari, Case Nuove Russo, Case Nuove Malluzzo, Mongiove, Scala, Moreri, San Cosimo, Madoro, Scarpiglia, Marinello, Gallo, Camera, Provenzani, Sorrentini.

Government
  - Mayor: Gianluca Bonsignore

Area
  - Total: 50.08 km^{2} (19.34 sq mi)
- Elevation: 157 m (515 ft)

Population (31 August 2020)
  - Total: 12,811
  - Density: 255.8/km^{2} (662.5/sq mi)
- Demonym: Pattesi
- Time zone: UTC+1 (CET)
  - Summer (DST): UTC+2 (CEST)
- Website: Official website

Patti is a town and comune in northeastern Sicily, southern Italy, administratively part of the Metropolitan City of Messina, on the western shore of the gulf of the same name. It is located 76 kilometres (47 mi) from Messina.

It is connected to the rest of Sicily by train, via the Patti-San Piero Patti train station, located on the railway line Messina-Palermo, and the A20 Palermo-Messina highway.

It is best known for the remains of its rich monumental Roman Villa and for the impressive ruins of ancient city of Tyndaris nearby.

Patti is also famous for its large sandy beaches.

== History ==
The town was founded by the Norman king Roger II of Sicily in 1094.

Patti was destroyed by Frederick of Aragon about 1300, on account of its attachment to the House of Anjou; rebuilt in the 16th century, it was later sacked by the Ottoman Turks.

== Main sights ==
- Ruins of Tindari
- Remains of a Roman Villa (3rd century AD)
- Necropolises of Monte (10th through 8th centuries BC) and san Cosimo (3rd millennium BC through 9th century BC)
- Cathedral (10th century), housing the sepulchre of Adelasia Countess of Sicily, wife of Roger I.

== People ==
- Michele Sindona, banker and convicted felon
- Michelangelo Rampulla, footballer and manager
- Antonio "Tony" Cairoli, motorcycle racer
- Tony Terlazzo, weightlifter
- Patti Pants, musician

== See also ==
- Diocese of Patti

== Sources ==
- Michele Fasolo, Tyndaris e il suo territorio I. Introduzione alla carta archeologica del territorio di Tindari, Roma 2013, ISBN 978-88-908755-1-9 https://books.google.com/books?isbn=8890875518
- Michele Fasolo, Tyndaris e il suo territorio II. Carta archeologica del territorio di Tindari e materiali, Roma 2014, ISBN 978-88-908755-2-6 https://books.google.com/books?isbn=8890875526
