= Antonino Raspanti =

Italian bishop

His Excellency Antonino Raspanti
- Bishop of Acireale
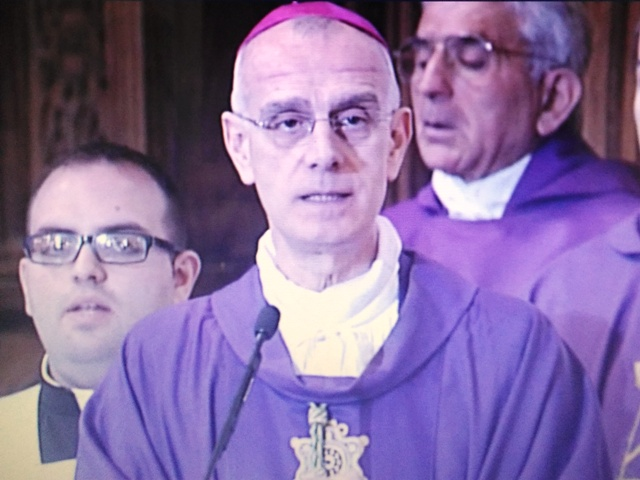
- Church: Roman Catholic Church
- Diocese: Roman Catholic Diocese of Acireale
- Installed: 26 September 2011
- Predecessor: Pio Vittorio Vigo
- Previous posts: teacher of Dogmatic Theology and History of Spirituality at the Pontificia Facoltà Teologica di Sicilia "San Giovanni Evangelista"; principal of the Faculty of Theology of Sicily (2002-2009)

Orders
- Ordination: 7 September 1982 by Monsignor Emanuele Romano
- Consecration: 1 October 2011 by Paolo Romeo

Personal details
- Born: Antonino Raspanti; 20 June 1959 (age 67) Alcamo, Sicily
- Motto: Humilitas ac dulcedo
- Coat of arms

Styles of Antonino Raspanti
- Reference style: His Excellency
- Spoken style: Your Excellency
- Religious style: Bishop

Antonino Raspanti (Alcamo, 20 June 1959) is an Italian Bishop of the Catholic Church; he has been the Bishop of Acireale since 26 July 2011.

== Biography ==
Born in Alcamo (province of Trapani) into a family of practicing Catholics, he attended the Classical Lyceum of his town, obtaining a diploma in 1977, before entering the Seminary of Trapani.

In 1982, he obtained a Baccalaureate at the Pontifical Faculty of Theology of Sicily "San Giovanni Evangelista" and became a deacon on 6 March 1982. On 7 September 1982, he was ordained a priest by the Bishop of Trapani, Emanuele Romano. Later, in 1990, he completed his academic studies with a Doctorate in Theology from the Pontifical Gregorian University in Rome.

In 2003, he created a religious association called "Confraternita Beata Vergine Maria del Monte Carmelo" (Confraternity of the Blessed Virgin Mary of Mount Carmel), formed by priests and laymen devoted to a life of personal prayer and spiritual reading.

During his 27 years of teaching at the Faculty of Theology of Palermo, he dedicated himself to dogmatic theology and later to spirituality, publishing the results of his research in articles, volumes and reviews; including a 2009 book published by Glossa Editrice, a translation, with an introduction and notes, of the "La pratica facile per elevare l'anima a Dio" (The Easy Practice to Elevate One’s Soul to God) of the 17th century French mystic Francois Malaval.

As Bishop of Acireale, he has been an advocate for the promotion of agricultural and touristic cooperatives. He has also fought poverty in the region and supported policies and social programs to create job opportunities for everyone.

As the acting president of the Fondazione Città del Fanciullo, Bishop Raspanti has also assisted in the creation of the Ecomuseum of sky and earth, which is located within the Roman Catholic Diocese of Acireale, in the municipality of Randazzo, Gruppo di Azione Locale Terre dell’Etna e dell’Alcantara, Ente Parco Fluviale dell’Alcantara, Associazione culturale Cento Campanili and Fondazione Regina Margherita are involved in.

=== Pastoral Ministry ===
- Parish priest at Scopello, then at Dattilo (a hamlet of Paceco) and of the Mother church at Erice
- 1984-1986: Parochial Vicar in Trapani Cathedral
- 1984-1988: diocesan deputy assistant of the youth sector of Azione Cattolica
- 1984-1993: teacher of Dogmatic Theology at the ISRS "Alberto degli Abati" in Trapani
- 1984-1998: teaching assistant of Dogmatic Theology and History of Spirituality at the Pontificia Facoltà Teologica di Sicilia "San Giovanni Evangelista"
- 1986-1991: pastor of the parish "Maria Santissima delle Grazie" in Trapani
- 1991-1992: pastor of the parish "San Giuseppe" in Trapani
- 1993-1994: in the parish "Maria Santissima delle Grazie", in Trapani
- 1995-2000: assistant of the Missionarie della Regalità di Nostro Signore Gesù Cristo and archpriest of Erice
- 1995-2001: deputy pastor of Chiesa madre at Erice
- 1998-2001: spiritual director at the diocesan Seminary of Trapani.
- from 1998: permanent teacher of History of Spirituality at the Faculty of Theology of Sicily.
- 1999-2009: member of the Pastoral Council and of the College of Consultors of the Roman Catholic Diocese of Trapani.
- 1999-2002: deputy head of the Faculty of Theology of Sicily, he also was its principal from 2002 to 2009.
- Since 2005: member of the Pontifical Academy of Theology and Chaplain of His Holiness.
- Since 2008: member of the Committee for the Studies of Theology and Religious Sciences of Italian Episcopal Conference.
- Since November 2019: member of the Pontificio Consiglio della Cultura.

Moderator of the pious Confraternity Beata Vergine Maria del Monte Carmelo, he is also a bishop delegate for Ecumenism and the Interreligious Dialogue in the Sicilian Episcopal Conference and a Vice-President of the Preparatory Committee of the 5th Convention of Italian Church, held in Florence in 2015.

Finally, as an expert of the Congregation for Catholic Education, he has contributed to the writing of "La cultura della qualità. Guida per le Facoltà ecclesiastiche", published by the Vatican Publishing House (Libreria Editrice Vaticana).

=== Episcopate ===
On 26 July 2011 Pope Benedict XVI appointed him as the Bishop of Acireale, succeeding Archbishop Pio Vittorio Vigo, who had retired on grounds of age. On 1 October 2011, he was ordained as bishop in the Acireale Cathedral by Cardinal Paolo Romeo, with Archbishop Pio Vittorio Vigo and Bishop Francesco Miccichè co-consecrating.

From 24 September 2015 to 4 April 2016, he also held the office of apostolic administrator of the Roman Catholic Archdiocese of Messina-Lipari-Santa Lucia del Mela. On 24 May 2017 he was elected vice-president of Italian Episcopal Conference for Southern Italy.

Pope Francis named him a member of the Pontifical Council for Culture on 11 November 2019.

In April 2019, Raspanti was called to testify about “the behavior of the church of Acireale” towards the Catholic Culture and Environment Association (ACCA). Former ACCA leader Piero Alfio Capuana, who stationed his group's headquarters in Acireale, was jailed in 2017 on charges of sexually abusing underage girls.

=== Works ===
Bishop Raspanti has written and edited more than 50 books about theological, philosophical and literary subjects, among which include studies on Pico della Mirandola, Teresa di Lisieux, Pina Suriano, Giacomo Cusmano, Cataldo Naro and Gesualdo Bufalino.

== Sources ==
- "Curriculum vitae" (PDF). Archived from the original (PDF) on 2017-08-28.
- "Mons.Raspanti:Una società è sana se crea cultura e lavoro". Archived from the original on 2017-08-29.
- "Un "prete per i giovani e rock"".
- "Acireale, nasce l'ecomuseo del cielo e della terra".
- "ernesto di lorenzo editore". 11 June 2014.
