= Micciche =

Micciche or Miccichè (Italian: [mittʃiˈkɛ], Sicilian: [mɪttʃɪˈcɛ]) is an Italian surname from Sicily. Notable people with the surname include:

- Carmelo Micciche (born 1963), French footballer
- Dan Micciche (born 1979), British football manager
- Francesco Miccichè (born 1943), Italian Roman Catholic prelate
- Francesco Miccichè (born 1958), Italian politician
- Gianfranco Miccichè (born 1954), Italian politician
- Peter Micciche (born 1961), American politician
