= List of Milton Keynes Dons F.C. records and statistics =

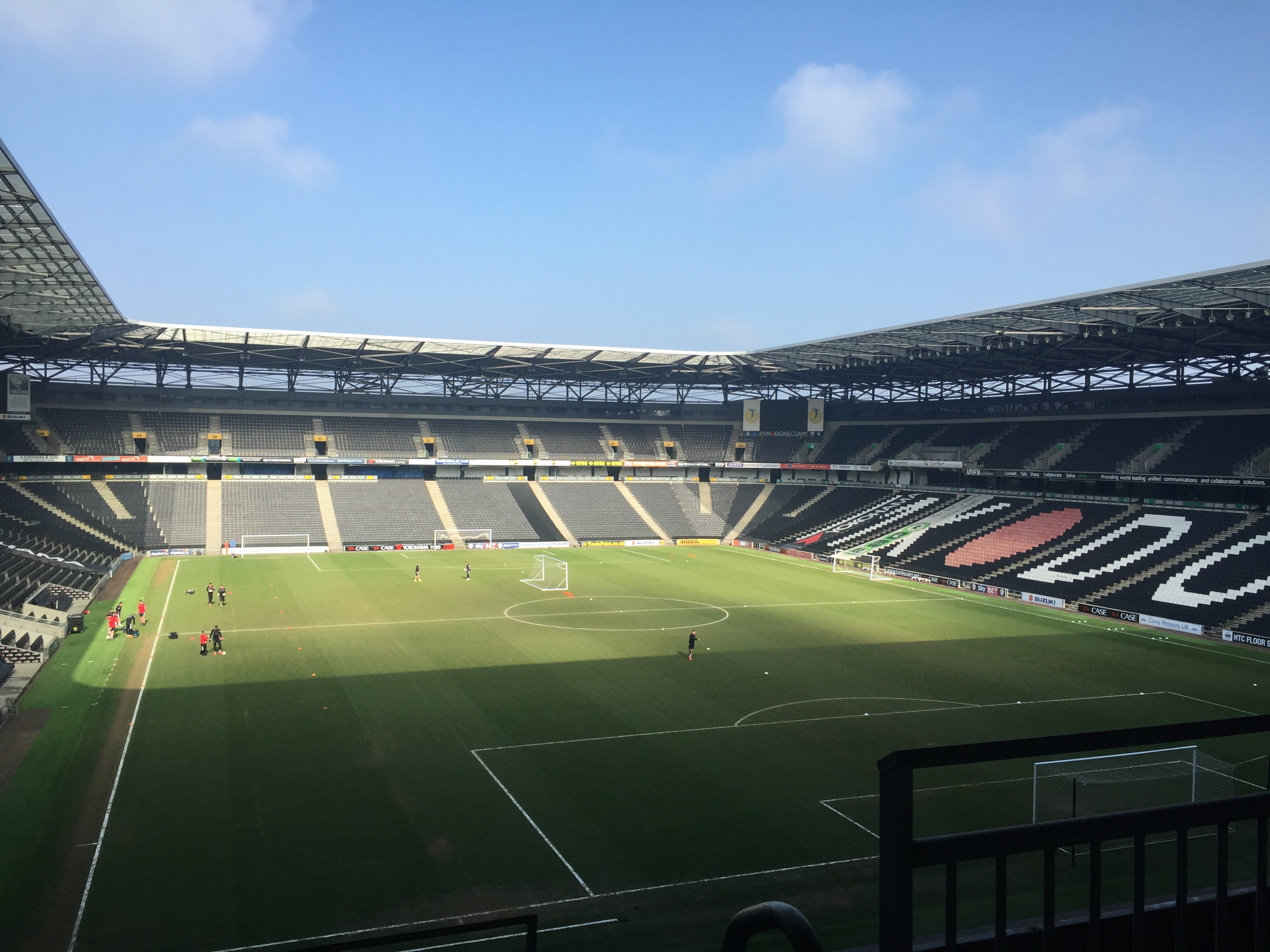
View of the north and east stands at Stadium MK in 2016.

Milton Keynes Dons Football Club is an English professional association football club based in Denbigh, Milton Keynes, which was established in 2004. Following the controversial relocation of Wimbledon F.C. to Milton Keynes in September 2003, Wimbledon F.C. was renamed Milton Keynes Dons F.C. along with a change of club crest and team colours in June 2004. Between August 2004 and July 2007, the club played their games at a temporary home of the National Hockey Stadium whilst their purpose-built permanent home of Stadium MK was under construction. Since 2004, the club have remained within The Football League. Having reached the Championship in 2015, their highest ever league status, as of the 2026–27 season, they currently play in League One, the third tier of English football, following promotion at the end of the 2025–26 season.

The list below encompasses major and minor honours won by Milton Keynes Dons, records set by the club, their managers and their players. The player records section itemises the club's leading goalscorers and those who have made most appearances in first-team competitions. It also records notable achievements by Milton Keynes Dons players on the international stage, and the highest transfer fees paid and received by the club. Attendance records at the National Hockey Stadium, as well as the club's current home, Stadium MK.

All records and figures are correct and up to date as of 2 May 2026.

== Honours ==
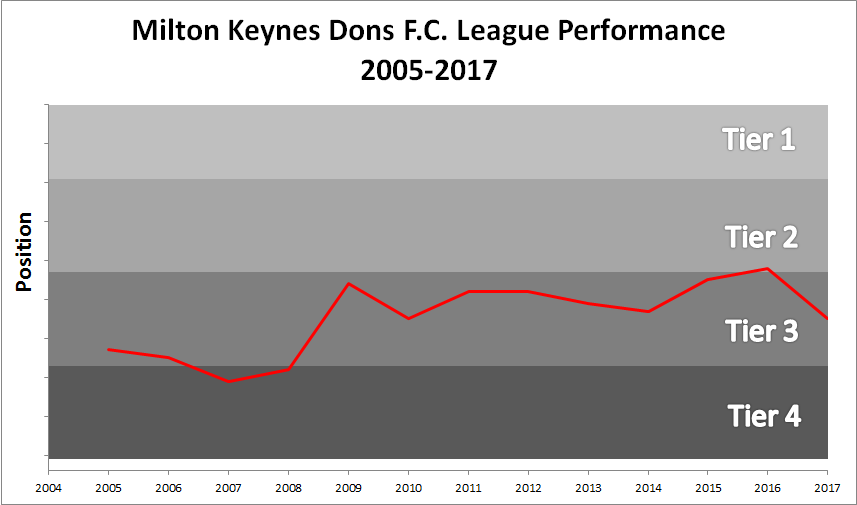
Chart showing the progress of MK Dons' league finishes since the 2004–05 season

League

- Football League One

Runners-up: 2014–15

- Football League Two / EFL League Two

Champions: 2007–08
Runners-up: 2025–26
Third-place (promoted): 2018–19

Cup

- Football League Trophy

Winners: 2007–08

- Berks & Bucks Senior Cup

Winners: 2006–07
Runners-up: 2005–06, 2017–18

- Portimão Cup

Winners: 2004

Source: MKDons.com

== Player records ==
=== Appearances ===
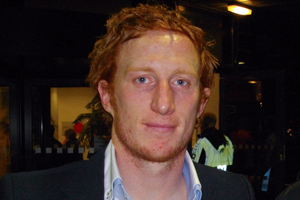
Dean Lewington has made the most club appearances for Milton Keynes Dons.

- Most club appearances: Dean Lewington, 917
- Most league appearances: Dean Lewington, 791
- Most FA Cup appearances: Dean Lewington, 49
- Most League Cup appearances: Dean Lewington, 28
- Most League Trophy appearances: Dean Lewington, 49
- Longest serving player: Dean Lewington, from 1 July 2004 until 3 May 2025 (20 years, 303 days) (Note: Start date given as the first day of the club's inaugural season - 1 July 2004.)
- Youngest first-team player: Joshua Bailey, 15 years, 109 days (against Southampton FC U23, League Trophy groupe phase, 10 November 2020)
- Oldest first-team player: Dean Lewington, 40 years, 350 days (against Swindon Town, League Two, 3 May 2025)

==== Most appearances ====
Competitive matches only (does not include pre-season friendlies or testimonials). Includes substitute appearances. Goals scored in brackets.
Correct as of 27 October 2026.

#	Name^{a}	Years	League	FA Cup	League Cup	Other^{b}	Total
1	(England) Dean Lewington	2004–2025	791 (21)	49 (0)	28 (1)	49 (2)	**917** (24)
2	(England) David Martin	2004–2006; 2010–2017	289 (0)	26 (0)	14 (0)	12 (0)	**341** (0)
3	(England) Daniel Powell	2008–2017	230 (37)	17 (3)	12 (3)	11 (3)	**270** (46)
4	(Republic of Ireland) Darren Potter	2011–2017	229 (9)	18 (3)	10 (0)	6 (0)	**263** (12)
5	(England) **Alex Gilbey**	2017–2020; 2023 – present	234 (49)	7 (1)	7 (0)	7 (0)	**255** (50)
6	(England) Luke Chadwick	2008–2014	210 (17)	12 (1)	12 (4)	12 (2)	**246** (24)
7	(England) Dean Bowditch	2011–2017	192 (37)	17 (7)	11 (4)	7 (0)	**227** (48)
8	(Republic of Ireland) Stephen Gleeson	2009–2014	174 (16)	14 (1)	7 (0)	11 (0)	**206** (17)
9	(England) Aaron Wilbraham	2005–2011	178 (50)	8 (0)	7 (3)	11 (4)	**204** (57)
10	(England) Izale McLeod	2004–2007; 2013–2014	165 (62)	10 (5)	7 (4)	6 (0)	**189** (71)

a. Names in bold are current first team squad members.
b. Goals and appearances (including those as a substitute) in the Football League Trophy and Football League Play-offs.

=== Firsts ===
- First club captain: Mark Williams
- First Football League goalscorer: Izale McLeod, against Barnsley, League One, 7 August 2004
- First FA Cup goalscorer: Wade Small, against Lancaster City, FA Cup first round, 13 November 2004
- First League Cup goalscorer: Izale McLeod, against Peterborough United, League Cup first round, 24 August 2004
- First League Trophy goalscorer: Richard Pacquette, against Brentford, League Trophy first round, 28 September 2004
- First hat-trick: Clive Platt, against Barnet, League Two, 20 January 2007
- First red card: Harry Ntimban-Zeh, against Cardiff City, League Cup second round, 21 September 2004

=== Goalscorers ===
- Most goals in a season (all competitions): Izale McLeod, 24 goals (in the 2006–07 season).
- Most league goals in a season: Izale Mcleod, 21 goals (in League Two, 2006–07)
- Most goals in a single match: 3 players - Aaron Collins, 4 goals (against Doncaster Rovers, League One, 31 October 2026), Scott Twine, 4 goals (against Plymouth Argyle, League One, 30 April 2022), Will Grigg, 4 goals (against Swindon Town, League One, 24 April 2021)
- Youngest goalscorer: George C Williams, 16 years, 65 days (against Nantwich Town, FA Cup first round, 12 November 2011)
- Youngest hat-trick scorer: Dele Alli, 17 years, 330 days (against Notts County, League One, 11 March 2014)
- Oldest goalscorer: Bradley Johnson, 35 years, 227 days (against Portsmouth, League One, 17 December 2022)
- Fastest goal scored: Scott Hogan, 12 seconds (against Chesterfield, League Two, 3 December 2024)

==== Top goalscorers ====
Competitive matches only (does not include pre-season friendlies or testimonials). Numbers in brackets indicate appearances made.
Correct as of 27 October 2026.

#	Name^{a}	Years	League	FA Cup	League Cup	Other^{b}	Total
1	(England) Izale McLeod	2004–2007; 2013–2014	62 (165)	5 (10)	4 (8)	0 (6)	**71** (189)
2	(England) Aaron Wilbraham	2005–2011	50 (178)	0 (8)	3 (7)	4 (11)	**57** (204)
3	(England) Kieran Agard	2016–2021	40 (145)	4 (9)	0 (3)	6 (9)	**50** (166)
3	(England) **Alex Gilbey**	2017–2020; 2023–present	49 (234)	1 (7)	0 (7)	0 (7)	**50** (255)
5	(England) Dean Bowditch	2011–2017	37 (192)	7 (17)	4 (11)	0 (7)	**48** (227)
6	(England) Daniel Powell	2008–2017	37 (230)	3 (17)	3 (12)	3 (11)	**46** (270)
7	(England) Sam Baldock	2005–2011	33 (102)	2 (6)	4 (5)	4 (11)	**43** (124)
8	(Northern Ireland) Will Grigg	2014–2015; 2021; 2022–2023	33 (106)	1 (5)	4 (4)	1 (2)	**39** (117)
9	(England) Chuks Aneke	2016–2019	30 (84)	1 (6)	0 (0)	2 (4)	**33** (94)
9	(Northern Ireland) Ben Reeves	2013–2017; 2019–2020	25 (127)	6 (12)	1 (9)	1 (6)	**33** (154)

a. Names in bold are current first team squad members.
b. Goals and appearances (including those as a substitute) in the Football League Trophy and the Football League Play-offs.

==== Top goalscorers by season ====
Competitive matches only.

Season	Player^{a}	Total Goals	League	FA Cup	League Cup	League Trophy	EFL Play-offs
2025–26	(Scotland) **Callum Paterson**	16	16	0	0	0	—
2024–25	(England) **Alex Gilbey**	11	11	0	0	0	—
2023–24	(England) Max Dean	19	15	1	0	2	1
2022–23	(Sudan) Mohamed Eisa	14	11	2	0	1	—
2021–22	(England) Scott Twine	20	20	0	0	0	0
2020–21	(England) Cameron Jerome	15	13	2	0	0	—
2019–20	(England) Rhys Healey	12	11	0	1	0	—
2018–19	(England) Kieran Agard	22	20	1	0	1	—
2017–18	(England) Chuks Aneke	10	9	1	0	0	—
2016–17	(England) Kieran Agard	14	12	1	0	1	—
2015–16	(England) Nicky Maynard	7	6	1	0	—	—
2015–16	(England) Josh Murphy	7	5	1	1	—	—
2014–15	(Northern Ireland) Will Grigg	22	20	0	2	0	—
2013–14	(England) Patrick Bamford	17	14	1	1	1	—
2012–13	(England) Ryan Lowe	12	11	1	0	0	—
2011–12	(England) Dean Bowditch	11	11	0	0	0	—
2011–12	(England) Daniel Powell	11	6	2	2	0	1
2010–11	(England) Sam Baldock	14	12	0	1	0	1
2009–10	(Wales) Jermaine Easter	19	14	1	1	3	—
2008–09	(England) Aaron Wilbraham	17	16	0	0	0	1
2007–08	(England) Mark Wright	15	13	0	0	2	—
2006–07	(England) Izale McLeod	24	21	2	1	0	0
2005–06	(England) Izale McLeod	18	17	1	0	0	—
2004–05	(England) Izale McLeod	18	16	0	2	0	—

a. Names in bold are current first team squad members.

=== International ===
The following players received the following full international caps whilst still a registered player at Milton Keynes Dons (does not include players on loan from other clubs):

- (Wales) Simon Church (9 caps)
- (Northern Ireland) Lee Hodson (7 caps)
- (Northern Ireland) Mark Williams (6 caps)
- (Canada) Ali Gerba (5 caps)
- (Sudan) Mohamed Eisa (2 caps)
- (Northern Ireland) Ben Reeves (2 caps)
- (Wales) Aaron Collins (1 cap)
- (Wales) Jermaine Easter (1 cap)
- (Guatemala) Nathaniel Mendez-Laing (1 cap)
- (Wales) Craig Morgan (1 cap)

=== Transfers ===
Record transfer fees paid

#	Fee	Paid to	For	Date	Notes	Ref
1	£800,000	(England) Bolton Wanderers	(Wales) Aaron Collins	19 June 2025		
2	Undisclosed	(England) Peterborough United	(Sudan) Mohamed Eisa	20 July 2021		
3	£250,000	(England) Bristol City	(England) Kieran Agard	11 August 2016		

Record transfer fees received

#	Fee	Received from	For	Date	Notes	Ref
1	£5,000,000	(England) Tottenham Hotspur	(England) Dele Alli	1 February 2015	plus loan back and add-ons	
2	£4,000,000	(England) Burnley	(England) Scott Twine	26 June 2022	plus sell-on clause	
3	£2,750,000	(England) West Ham United	(England) Sam Baldock	27 August 2011		
4	£2,000,000	(Belgium) KAA Gent	(England) Max Dean	12 July 2024	Leeds United received up to 50% of transfer fee	
5	£2,000,000	(England) Liverpool	(England) Sheyi Ojo	11 November 2011	Academy player	

== Managerial records ==
The following managerial records apply only to permanently appointed managers of the club and not caretaker managers:

- First manager: Stuart Murdoch, 1 July 2004 to 8 November 2004 (Note: Stuart Murdoch was previously manager of Wimbledon prior to the club's name change to Milton Keynes Dons and continued as the club's manager under their new identity. Start date given as start date of the 2004–05 season - 1 July 2004 - the club's first season as Milton Keynes Dons.)
- Longest-serving manager: Karl Robinson – 6 years, 174 days (10 May 2010 to 23 October 2016)
- Highest win percentage: Roberto di Matteo, 55.00%
- Lowest win percentage: Dan Micciche, 18.75%
- Youngest manager (on appointment): Karl Robinson – 29 years, 237 days
- Oldest manager (on appointment): Stuart Murdoch – 53 years, 315 days

== Club records ==
=== Progression ===
- Highest league finish: 23rd, Championship, 2015–16
- Furthest FA Cup progression: Fifth round, 2012–13
- Furthest EFL Cup progression: Fourth round, 2014–15
- Furthest EFL Trophy progression: Winners, 2007–08

=== Attendances ===
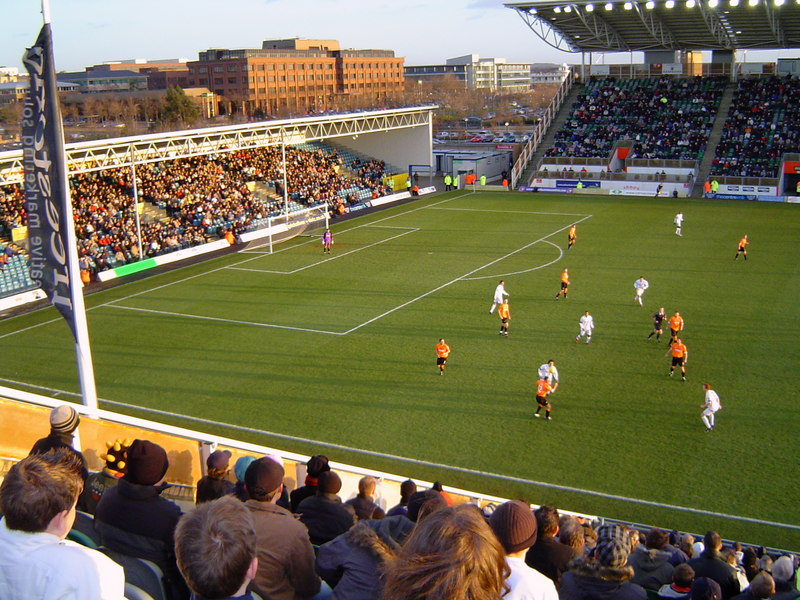
Milton Keynes Dons (white shirts) playing at the National Hockey Stadium during the 2004–05 season.

This section applies to attendances for matches involving the first team at the National Hockey Stadium, the club's (temporary) first home between 2004 and 2007, and Stadium MK, the club's present home.

- Highest attendance at Stadium MK: 28,521, against Liverpool, EFL Cup third round, 25 September 2019
- Lowest attendance at Stadium MK: 635, against Newport County, EFL Trophy group stage, 22 November 2022
- Highest attendance at the National Hockey Stadium: 8,426, against Bradford City, League One, 25 February 2006
- Lowest attendance at the National Hockey Stadium: 2,065 against Lancaster City, FA Cup first round, 13 November 2004

=== Matches ===
==== Firsts ====
- First competitive match: Milton Keynes Dons 1–1 Barnsley, League One, 7 August 2004
- First Football League match: Milton Keynes Dons 1–1 Barnsley, League One, 7 August 2004
- First FA Cup match: Milton Keynes Dons 1–0 Lancaster City, FA Cup first round, 13 November 2004
- First League Cup match: Peterborough United 0–3 Milton Keynes Dons, League Cup first round, 24 August 2004
- First League Trophy match: Brentford 0–3 Milton Keynes Dons, League Trophy southern section first round, 28 September 2004
- First match at the National Hockey Stadium: Milton Keynes Dons 1–1 Barnsley, League One, 7 August 2004
- First match at Stadium MK: Milton Keynes Dons 4–3 Chelsea XI, friendly, 18 July 2007

==== Record wins ====
- Record league win: Milton Keynes Dons 7–0 Oldham Athletic, League One, 20 December 2014
- Record FA Cup win: Milton Keynes Dons 6–0 Nantwich Town, FA Cup first round, 12 November 2011
- Record League Cup win: Milton Keynes Dons 4–0 Manchester United, League Cup second round, 26 August 2014
- Record League Trophy win: Milton Keynes Dons 6–0 Norwich City U21, EFL Trophy round of 32, 8 December 2020

==== Record defeats ====
- Record league defeat - margin of defeat (joint):

5–0 against Hartlepool United, League One, 3 January 2005
5–0 against Huddersfield Town, League One, 18 February 2006
5–0 against Rochdale, League Two, 27 January 2007
5–0 against Carlisle United, League One, 13 February 2010
0–5 against Burnley, Championship, 12 January 2016
5–0 against Bolton Wanderers, League One, 14 February 2023
5–0 against Stockport County, League Two, 23 March 2024

- Record league defeat - goals conceded: 6–3 against Newport County, League Two, 21 December 2024
- Record FA Cup defeat: Milton Keynes Dons 1–5 Chelsea, FA Cup fourth round, 31 January 2016
- Record League Cup defeat: Milton Keynes Dons 0–6 Southampton, League Cup third round, 23 September 2015
- Record League Trophy defeat: Milton Keynes Dons 0–4 Chelsea U21, EFL Trophy second round, 6 December 2017

==== Highest scoring fixture ====
- Record highest scoring fixture: (9 goals) Newport County 6–3 Milton Keynes Dons, League Two, 21 December 2024

=== Goals ===
- Most goals scored in a season (all competitions): 117 in 53 games, 2014–15
- Fewest goals scored in a season (all competitions): 48 in 52 games, 2015–16
- Most goals conceded in a season (all competitions) (joint):

84 in 56 games, 2009–10
84 in 52 games, 2015–16

- Fewest goals conceded in a season (all competitions): 48 in 55 games, 2007–08
- Most league goals scored in a season: 101 in 46 games, League One, 2014–15
- Fewest league goals scored in a season: 39 in 46 games, Championship, 2015–16
- Most league goals conceded in a season (joint):

69 in 46 games, Championship, 2015–16
69 in 46 games, League One, 2017–18

- Fewest league goals conceded in a season: 37 in 46 games, League Two, 2007–08

=== Points ===
- Most points in a season: 92 in 46 matches, League Two, 2007–08
- Fewest points in a season: 39 in 46 matches, Championship, 2015–16

=== Runs ===
- Longest league winning run: 8 matches, League Two, 2007–08
- Longest league unbeaten run: 18 matches, League Two, 2007–08
- Longest league winless run: 12 matches, League One, 2019–20
- Longest league losing run: 6 matches, League One, 2017–18

=== Clean sheets ===
- Most clean sheets in a season as a team (league): 19 matches, League Two, 2007–08
- Fewest clean sheets in a season as a team (league): 8 matches, League One, 2005–06
- Most clean sheets in a season as a team (all competitions): 22 matches, 2007–08
- Fewest clean sheets in a season as a team (all competitions): 8 matches, 2005–06
- Most consecutive clean sheets: 6 matches, League Two, 18 April 2025 to 9 August 2025

== Penalty shoot-outs ==
Season	Date	Competition	Round	Opponent	Venue	Result	Score	Ref
2007–08	14 August 2007	League Cup	First round	Ipswich Town	Home	Won	5–3	
2007-08	8 January 2008	Football League Trophy	Area South Semi-Final	Gillingham FC	Away	Won	5-4	
2007–08	25 February 2008	Football League Trophy	Area South Final	Swansea City	Home	Won	5–4	
2008–09	15 May 2009	League One play-offs	Semi-final	Scunthorpe	Home	Lost	6–7	
2010–11	16 November 2010	FA Cup	First round	Stevenage	Home	Lost	6–7	
2011–12	30 August 2011	Football League Trophy	First round	Brentford	Home	Lost	3–4	
2012–13	11 August 2012	League Cup	First round	Cheltenham Town	Away	Won	5–3	
2016–17	23 August 2016	EFL Cup	Second round	Reading	Away	Lost	2–4	
2017–18	3 October 2017	EFL Trophy	Group stage	Stevenage	Home	Won	5–4	
2018–19	4 September 2018	EFL Trophy	Group stage	Peterborough United	Home	Won	6–5	
2019–20	13 August 2019	EFL Cup	First round	AFC Wimbledon	Away	Won	4–2	
2020–21	8 November 2020	FA Cup	First round	Eastleigh	Away	Won	4–3	
2020–21	9 January 2021	FA Cup	Third round	Burnley	Away	Lost	3–4	
2021–22	30 November 2021	EFL Trophy	Third round	Leyton Orient	Away	Won	5–4	
