= Sala Laurentina, Trapani =

Historic pastoral building in Trapani, Sicily

Sala Laurentina
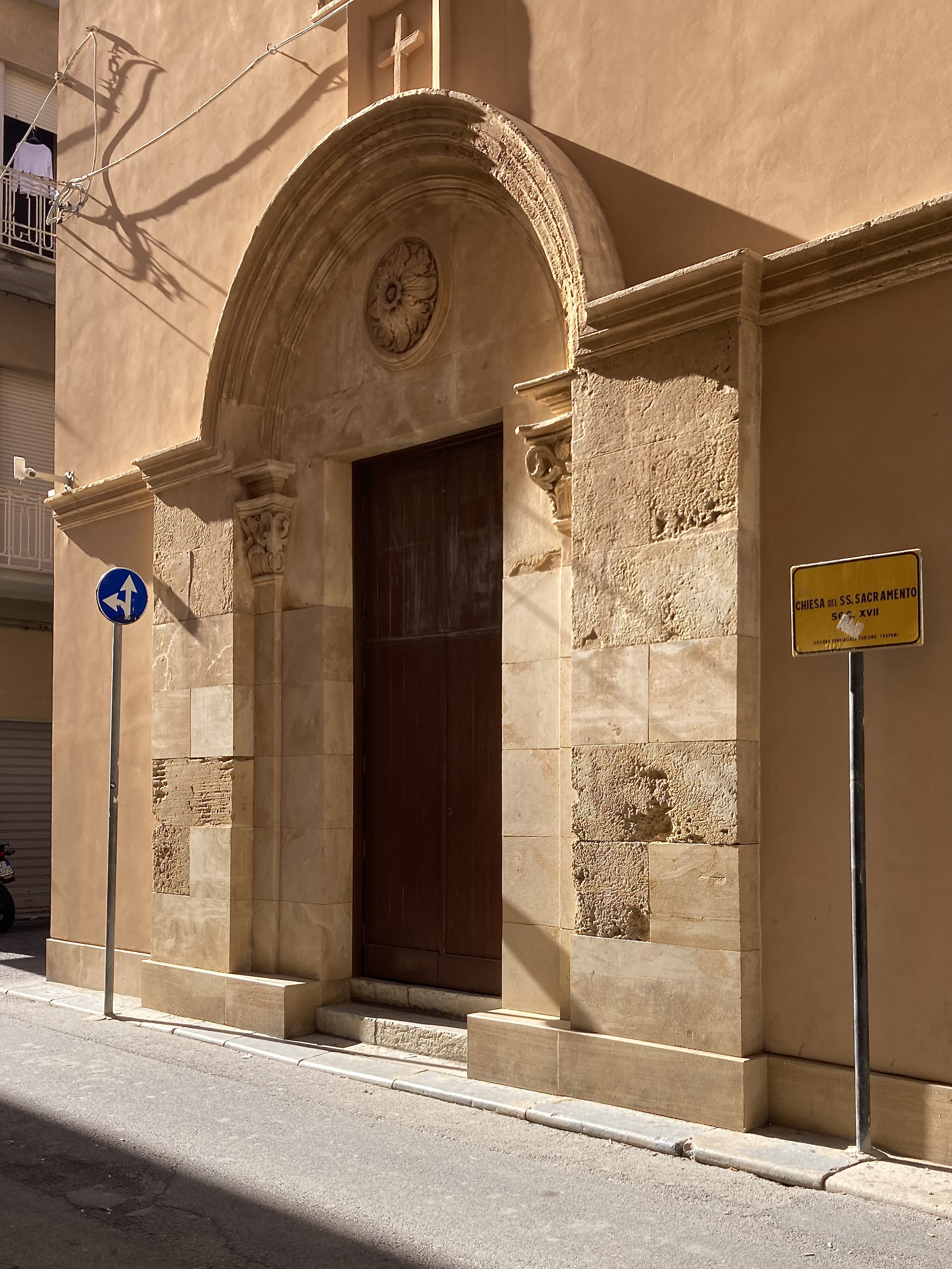
- Exterior view of the Sala Laurentina
- Former names: Church of the Santissimo Sacramento

General information
- Type: Oratory; pastoral hall
- Location: Trapani, Sicily, Italy, Via Generale Domenico Giglio
- Coordinates: 38°00′56″N 12°30′27″E
- Owner: Diocese of Trapani

Sala Laurentina is a three-storey building owned by the Diocese of Trapani in the historic centre of Trapani, Sicily.
