= Oratory of Saint Philip Neri =

Roman Catholic society of apostolic life

Coordinates: 41°53′55″N 12°28′15″E

Confederation of Oratories of Saint Philip Neri
- Confoederatio Oratorii Sancti Philippi Nerii (Latin)
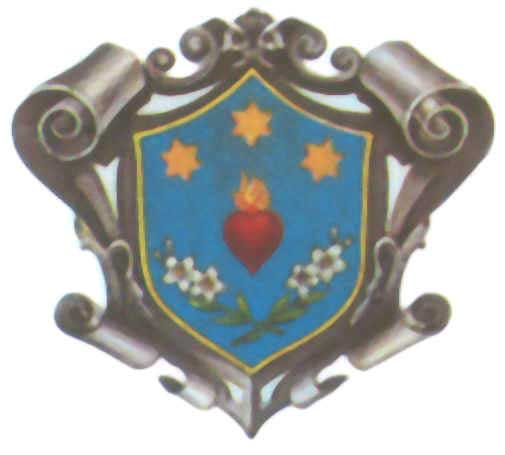
- Emblem of the Congregation of the Oratory of Saint Philip Neri
- Abbreviation: C.O. or Cong. Orat.
- Nickname: Oratorians
- Formation: July 15, 1575; 451 years ago
- Founder: Philip Neri
- Founded at: Rome, Italy
- Type: Society of apostolic life of pontifical right for men
- Headquarters: Rome, Italy
- Members: 501 (including 430 priests) (2020)
- Procurator general: Michele Nicolis
- Parent organization: Roman Catholic Church
- Website: www.oratoriosanfilippo.org

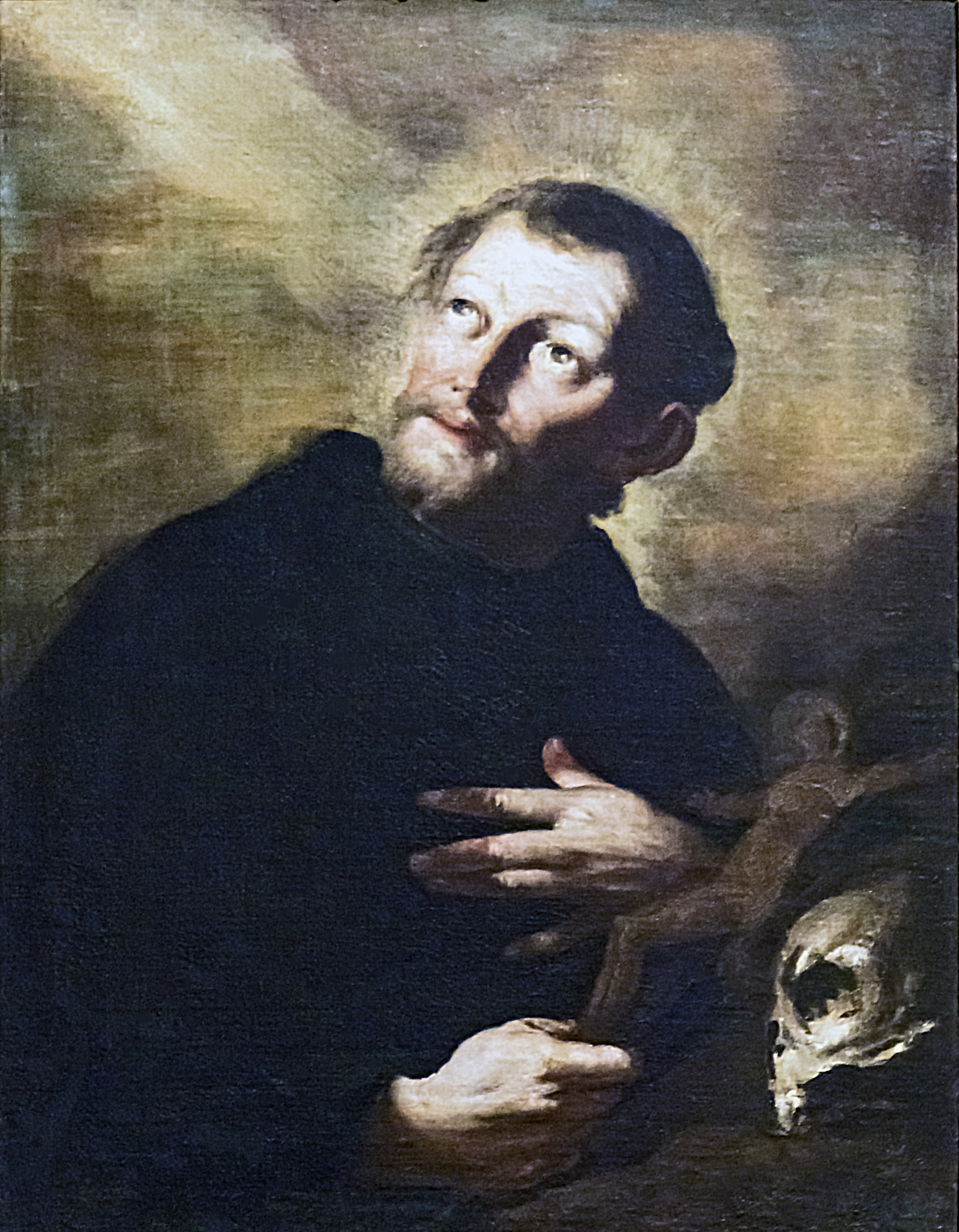
Philip Neri

The Confederation of Oratories of Saint Philip Neri (Latin: Confoederatio Oratorii Sancti Philippi Nerii), abbreviated C.O. and commonly known as the Oratorians, is a Catholic society of apostolic life of pontifical right for men (priests and religious brothers) who live together in a community bound together by no formal vows but only with the bond of charity.

Founded in Rome in 1575 by Philip Neri, today it has spread around the world, with over 70 Oratories and some 500 priests. The post-nominal initials commonly used to identify members of the society are "CO" (Congregatio Oratorii). The abbreviation "Cong. Orat." is also used.

Unlike a religious institute (the members of which take vows and are answerable to a central authority) or a monastery (the monks of which are likewise bound by vows in a community that may itself be autonomous and answerable directly to the pope), the Oratorians commit themselves to membership in a particular, independent, self-governing local community (an Oratory, usually named for the place in which it is located: e.g., Birmingham Oratory, Oxford Oratory, Brooklyn Oratory) without actually taking vows, an unusual and innovative arrangement created by Philip. Normally an oratory must have a minimum of four members, two being ordained, in order to be founded. If a group of men seeks to establish an oratory, they may apply to do so, going through the proper diocesan channels; during the process of formation a member (or members) of a well-established oratory resides in the community to facilitate every aspect of the proposed foundation.

== History ==
The Congregation of the Oratory was founded by Philip Neri (1515–1595) in the city of Rome. The first Oratory received papal recognition in 1575. The new community was to be a congregation of secular priests living under obedience but bound by no vows. Speaking of Neri, whom he called "the saint of joy", Pope John Paul II said, "As is well known, the saint used to put his teaching into short and wise maxims: 'Be good, if you can...' He did not choose the life of solitude; but, in exercising his ministry among the common people, he also wished to be 'salt' for all those who met him. Like Jesus, he was equally able to enter into the human misery present in the noble palaces and in the alleys of Renaissance Rome."

The core of Philip's spirituality focused on an unpretentious return to the lifestyle of the first Disciples of Christ. The object of the institute is threefold: prayer, preaching, and the sacraments.

Up to 1800 the Oratory continued to spread through Italy, Sicily, Spain, Portugal, Poland, and other European countries; in South America, Brazil, India, and Ceylon. Under Napoleon I the Oratory was in various places despoiled and suppressed, but the congregation recovered and, after a second suppression in 1869, again revived. A few houses were founded in Munich and Vienna.

== Governance ==
There are 86 Congregations of the Oratory throughout the world. Each Community is autonomous, but there is a Confederation which facilitates contact with the Holy See. As such, the Congregation of the Oratory functions more like a monastic federation than like a religious institute.

Three documents govern the Oratory. The first is the "General Statutes" of the Congregation, which are guidelines to be followed throughout the world; these may be changed or modified when representatives from each Oratory gather every six years in a meeting called a "Congresso Generale". The second is the "Particular Statutes", which outline how an individual Oratory is to be conducted; these must be approved by Rome. The third document is the "Constitutions", which establish general norms, and outline the relationship between the Congregation and the Holy See. As the Oratory is a confederation, there is no central authority such as is found within the Dominicans, Franciscans, or Jesuits. The definitive foundation of an Oratorian Congregation is actually done by the Roman Pontiff directly, which makes a Congregation what is called a "Pontifical Right" foundation.

The Confederation elects one of its own to represent the interests of the Congregations to the Holy See; this is done through the Dicastery for Institutes of Consecrated Life and Societies of Apostolic Life. This person, known as the Procurator General, resides in Rome at the Procura General.

== Daily life ==
Frederick William Faber described the Oratorian charism as "a spirituality of everyday life". The Oratory founded by St Philip Neri is a society of priests and brothers who live together under a Rule without taking religious vows. Hence, Oratorians are free to resign their membership in the Congregation without canonical impediment or ecclesiastical dispensation. An Oratorian resides in an Oratory community of his choosing and is permanently stable, i.e., he is not subject to transfer to other Oratories or communities. Oratorians have what is called 'stability,' which means they are committed as members of the community of a particular Oratory, though a member may move if there is a serious enough reason.

As there is no vow of poverty, Oratorians may keep their possessions, and those who can afford to do so are expected to contribute to the support of the house. It is possible for an ordained secular priest to join the Community if he feels called to a more recollected life in community than is possible in a diocesan presbytery, however the Constitutions do not permit anyone who has been a solemnly professed religious to join the Congregation. Neither is it customary to admit anyone over the age of 45.

Unlike the members of some religious institutes, Oratorians are not bound by a rule to pray in common, though this is something that Oratorians consider important, and they commit themselves to praying together at least twice each day, and having one communal meal which is usually dinner. Oratorians normally have a set time each day for praying together in silent meditation; this ends classically with the recitation of a litany.

Although some oratories may have a dominant mission (e.g., the London Oratory, which maintains a school), in general the members of the Oratory spend the day involved in various ministries: teaching, parish work, spiritual direction, campus ministry, hospital chaplaincies, administration or maintaining the fabric of the community house. Some oratories are specifically connected with parishes and thus its members serve as clergy of the parish.

== Habit ==
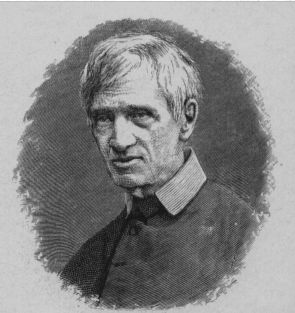
John Henry Newman and the Oratorian collar

As secular clergy, Oratorians wear a dress similar to that of diocesan priests. However, the black cassock is worn with a distinctive Oratorian clerical collar: a white cloth that folds over the collar all around the neck, with a number of folds inward, indicating the particular oratory from which the priest originates. The cassock is bound by a fascia. The habit is given at formal reception into the community which comes after a few months of living together to see if the candidate fits in well. Members often, but do not necessarily, wear the cassock whilst engaged in their respective ministries. When not wearing the cassock, members of the Oratory would wear the normal street clothes of a cleric, such as a clerical shirt, but with the Oratorian collar. In some countries such as Spain, Oratorians do not wear the distinctive Oratorian cassock and collar, making them indistinguishable from other secular priests.

== Oratories around the world ==
As of 2014, the website of the oratory's "headquarters" in Rome lists the following as some of the numerous congregations throughout the world:

=== Europe ===
There are oratories in: Vienna, Austria; Dijon, Hyères, and Nancy, France; Acireale, Biella, Bologna, Brescia, Florence, Genoa, Naples, Palermo, Rome, Verona, Prato and Vicenza, Italy; Germany (Aachen, Aufhausen, Dresden, Frankfurt, Hanover, Heidelberg, Leipzig, Celle and Munich); Lithuania (Vilnius); Netherlands (Maastricht); Poland (Gostyń, Studzianna, Tarnów, Radom, Bytów, Tomaszów Mazowiecki and Poznań); Portugal (Convento e Palácio de Nossa Senhora das Necessidades, Lisbon); Spain (Barcelona, Seville, Porreras, Albacete, Vic, Alcalá de Henares, Getafe, Tudela, Soller and Palma) and Switzerland (Zürich). There are also Oratories in formation in Bratislava, Slovakia; Mikulov in the Czech Republic; and Dublin, Ireland;

=== United Kingdom ===
Saint John Henry Newman founded the first Oratory in the English-speaking world when he established the Birmingham Oratory in the city of Birmingham on 2 February 1848. This was initially located at Old Oscott, which Newman renamed Maryvale (after the Oratory church in Rome, Santa Maria in Vallicella). After a couple of moves this community eventually settled in Edgbaston. Attached to the Birmingham Oratory was The Oratory School now at Woodcote, Berkshire, near Reading.

In 1849 a second congregation was founded in King William Street, Strand, London (the London Oratory), with Frederick William Faber as superior; in 1854 it was transferred to Brompton. The Fathers of the London Oratory founded the London Oratory School in 1863, which continues providing education in the Oratorian tradition to this day. Its church, the Church of the Immaculate Heart of Mary, was consecrated on 16 April 1884 and is the second largest Roman Catholic church in London.

A House also exists in Oxford (the Oxford Oratory).

In October 2013, the church of St Wilfrid, York, was turned over to the Oxford Oratorians on the retirement of the incumbent parish priest and is now canonically established, known as the York Oratory.

In Manchester (St Chad's) there is a community canonically established on the Feast of All Saints, 2019.

There are also Houses in Formation at St Alban-on-the-Moors Church, Cardiff, as of April 2016, in Bournemouth, as of May 2017, and in Edinburgh, as of 25 March 2025.

=== Latin America and the Caribbean ===
Oratorio of San Felipe Neri, San Miguel de Allende, Mexico, primarily built in 1712

The Oratorio in Guanajuato City, Mexico

In Argentina: (Mercedes); Brazil: (São Paulo); Chile: (Villa Alemana); Colombia: (Bogotá, Ipiales and Pasto); Costa Rica: (San José); Mexico: (Guanajuato, Mexico City, Orizaba, Puebla, San Miguel de Allende, Tlalnepantla, Reynosa, Tamaulipas, La Paz, Leon, San Pablo Tepetlapa y Mérida.

The Oratorio de San Felipe Neri in Guanajuato City was dedicated on Nov. 8, 1765 by the Jesuit order but was taken over by the Oratorian order. The church was officially reopened in 1794 by the Congregation of the Oratory of San Felipe Neri.

As of 2012 there was an Oratory in Formation in Port Antonio, Jamaica (Archdiocese of Kingston). This community of priests had been constituted many years ago and upon completing the necessary requirements in the Archdiocese of Kingston in 2014 the community was erected as a Congregation of the Oratory of St. Philip Neri, the first in the history of the English speaking Caribbean.

=== North America ===
In Canada, the Oratorians have a house in Toronto, the Toronto Oratory, although the original foundation was in Montreal in 1975.

The first Oratory in the United States was founded in Rock Hill, South Carolina, in 1934. The ministry of the Rock Hill Oratorians has long included campus ministry at Winthrop University and prison visitation at the Moss detention center in York County.

The Pittsburgh Oratory was founded in 1961 by Cardinal John Wright, then-Bishop of Pittsburgh, in order to have Oratorian Fathers serving as Chaplains at Carnegie Mellon University, Chatham University, and the University of Pittsburgh. The Pittsburgh Oratory's ministry has since expanded to adult ministry, confession ministry, and a ministry of Perpetual Eucharistic Adoration. The Pittsburgh Oratory maintains an 87-acre retreat house in the nearby Laurel Highlands, called "Rednal". There are currently 7 priests and 2 brothers in formation at seminary.

The principal ministry of the Brooklyn Oratory, established in 1988, are the parishes of Saint Boniface, which it has cared for since 1990, and Assumption of the Blessed Virgin Mary in Brooklyn Heights which came under its pastoral care in 2016. In this year, the Brooklyn Oratory also began a pastoral outreach to students in the various secular colleges and universities in Downtown Brooklyn and Brooklyn Heights.

The Philadelphia Oratory was formed in 1990 at the Fairmount neighborhood parish of St. Francis Xavier. The oratory then gained responsibility for the parochial grade school: St. Francis Xavier School. It was formally established by Pope John Paul II in 2000.

The Raritan Congregation was formally established by Pope John Paul II, on 8 September 1998 as the New Brunswick Congregation. The members of the Congregation served in Catholic campus ministry at Rutgers University, at St. Peter the Apostle Parish and at St. Joseph Parish, New Brunswick, N.J. until 2018. The Oratory relocated to Raritan, N.J. at the request of Bishop James Checchio. The Raritan Oratory of St. Philip Neri serves five apostolates under its care: the Shrine Chapel of the Blessed Sacrament, St. Ann Church, St. Joseph Church, and St. Ann Classical Academy of Raritan, N.J. and Holy Trinity Church of Bridgewater, N.J.

The New York Oratory was founded on 28 June 2007, in Sparkill, New York. On the Feast of the Assumption of the Blessed Virgin Mary, 15 August 2007, the Procurator General P. Edoardo Cerrato consigned the Decree of the Foundation of New York Oratory to its members, during the celebration of the Eucharist, presided by Cardinal Egan, in the presence of Archbishop Alojz Tkac, Metropolitan of Košice, Slovakia, participating honorable guests, parishioners of Our Lady of the Sacred Heart Parish Tappan, NY, visitors from other parishes and friends.

In Washington, D.C., the Washington Oratory was established as a community-in-formation in July 2013 by canonical decree of the Archbishop of Washington, Donald Cardinal Wuerl and canonically erected by His Holiness Pope Francis on 2 February 2024. Washington's Oratorians are responsible for the administration of the parish of St. Thomas Apostle in Woodley Park. They oversee a chapter of the Little Oratory of St. Philip Neri, a group of Catholic laymen.

The Red Bank Oratory (official name Congregatio Oratorii Sancti Philippi Nerii Trentonensis): On Divine Mercy Sunday, April 7th, 2024, His Holiness, Pope Francis established The Red Bank Oratory as a Congregation of Pontifical Right. The church of the Oratory was established as The Oratory Church of St. Anthony of Padua in perpetuity. The Red Bank Oratory had its official beginning in September 2015, and was established as an Oratory-in-formation in March of 2016 in Red Bank, New Jersey, with the permission of Bishop David M. O'Connell. Bishop O'Connell then issued a canonical decree on 29 May 2016 to govern the community, and established the permanent home of the community at the church of Saint Anthony of Padua. The members of the Oratory-in-Formation subsequently established a Secular Oratory, the Women of Vallicella, a Children's Oratory, Jr. Oratory, a Youth Oratory, and the Friends of Saint Philip Neri which share in the spiritual and ministerial life of the Oratory.

In 2017, Pope Francis issued a decree establishing the Congregation of the Oratory of St. Philip Neri in the Archdiocese of Cincinnati. The Oratory is based at Old St. Mary's Church in the Over-the-Rhine neighborhood of Cincinnati.

There are also congregations are in Monterey, California; Pharr, Texas and Philadelphia, Pennsylvania.

A number of Oratories have associated with the congregation, a community of lay people called the Secular Oratory.

=== South Africa ===
The first Oratory in South Africa was founded in Oudtshoorn in 1997. The Port Elizabeth Oratory celebrated its inaugural Mass on 15 August 2008.

=== Australia ===
==== Brisbane ====
In 2011, work towards establishing the first Australian Congregation of the Oratory of St. Philip Neri was conceived. The community-in-formation was welcomed to Brisbane by Archbishop Mark Coleridge, and is supported by the Fathers of the London, Oxford, and Toronto Oratories. The Brisbane Oratory in Formation is based at Mary Immaculate Church, Annerley, in the Annerley Ekibin parish.

==== Melbourne ====
In December 2025, Archbishop Peter Comensoli, Archbishop of Melbourne, announced he had approved the establishment of an Oratory Project of St Philip Neri in the family of parishes of Malvern, Malvern East and Glen Iris. The Oratory began with one priest and two seminarians.

== Oratorian Saints, Blesseds, and other holy people ==
Note that feast days of blesseds are only celebrated by permission in specific dioceses or religious congregations and not throughout the whole Roman Rite.

Saints

- Philip Neri (22 July 1515 – 26 May 1595), founder of the Congregation, canonized on 12 March 1622. Feast 26 May.
- Francis de Sales (21 August 1567 – 28 December 1622). Founder and first Provost of the Oratory in Thonon-les-Bains, Haute-Savoie, France, and Bishop of Geneva, canonized on 8 April 1665. Feast 24 January.
- Joseph Vaz (21 April 1651 – 16 January 1711), Apostle of Sri Lanka, canonized 14 January 2015. Feast 16 January.
- Luigi Scrosoppi (4 August 1804 – 3 April 1884), founder of the Sisters of Providence of Saint Cajetan of Thiene, canonized on 10 June 2001. Feast 5 October.
- John Henry Newman (21 February 1801 – 11 August 1890). English convert and cardinal, canonized 13 October 2019, declared Doctor of the Church 1 November 2025. Feast 9 October.

Blesseds

- Giovanni Giovenale Ancina (19 October 1545 – 30 August 1604), Bishop of Saluzzo, beatified on 9 February 1890. Feast 30 August (1962 Calendar, 31 August).
- Vincenzo Antonio Grassi (13 November 1592 – 13 December 1671). priest, beatified on 30 September 1900. Feast 15 December.
- Sebastian Valfrè (9 March 1629 – 30 January 1710), priest and Apostle of Turin, beatified on 31 August 1834. Feast 30 January.
- Salvio Huix Miralpeix (22 December 1877 – 5 August 1936). Bishop of Lleida and Martyr of the Spanish Civil War, beatified on 13 October 2013. Feast 6 November.

Venerables

- Giovanni Battista Trona (18 October 1682 – 13 December 1750), priest, declared Venerable on 15 May 1927
- Giorgio Guzzetta (23 April 1682 – 21 November 1756), priest, declared Venerable on 25 November 2021
- Ignazio Eustachio Capizzi (20 September 1708 – 27 September 1783), priest, declared Venerable on 27 May 1858
- Giovanni Battista Arista (2 April 1863 – 27 September 1920), Bishop of Acireale, declared Venerable on 1 June 2007
- Filippo Bardellini (19 May 1878 – 24 August 1956), founder of the Poor Sisters of the House of Nazareth, declared Venerable on 12 April 2003
- Raimondo Calcagno (17 April 1888 – 18 July 1964), priest, declared Venerable on 7 November 2014

Servants of God

- Cesare Baronio (30 October 1538 – 10 June 1607), cardinal
- Jean-Baptiste Gault (29 December 1595 – 23 May 1643), Bishop of Marseille
- Bartolomeu de Quental (23 August 1626 – 20 December 1698), Portuguese priest
- Johann Georg Seidenbusch (5 April 1641 – 10 December 1729), German priest
- Nikola Bijanković (15 April 1661 – 10 August 1730), Bishop of Makarska
- Marco Antonio Ribaudengo (1 November 1703 – 7 August 1764), priest
- Luis Felipe Neri de Alfaro Velásquez (25 August 1709 – 22 March 1776), Mexican priest
- Mariano Patanè (2 May 1713 – 27 April 1804), priest
- Wawrzyniec Kuśniak (1 August 1788 – 15 March 1866), priest
- Giulio Castelli (24 June 1846 – 21 July 1926), priest, declared Servant of God on 23 September 2011
- Ramon Felius Turigas (4 May 1889 – 1 October 1936), Martyr of the Spanish Civil War
- Agustí Mas Folch (8 November 1866 – 16 March 1937), Martyr of the Spanish Civil War, declared Servant of God on 9 October 2007
- Ferdynand Machay (9 December 1914 – 8 June 1940), martyred under the Nazi occupation of Poland, declared Servant of God on 18 February 2003
- Jan Chryzostom Michałkowski (2 October 1914 – 26 December 1943), martyred under the Nazi occupation of Poland, declared Servant of God on 18 February 2003

== See also ==
- Caesar Baronius
- Church of the Immaculate Heart of Mary, popularly known as Brompton Oratory
- Frederick William Faber
- Institutes of consecrated life
- John Dobree Dalgairns
- Oratory of Jesus
- Oratory of the Good Shepherd
- Religious institute (Catholic)
- Secular institute
- Society of Apostolic Life
- Vocational discernment in the Catholic Church
- Chapelle de l'Oratoire, Nantes
