= Francesco Miccichè =

Francesco Miccichè may refer to:

- Francesco Miccichè (bishop), (born 1943), Italian Roman Catholic prelate, bishop of Trapani (1998–2012)
- Francesco Miccichè (film director), (born 1966), Italian film director and screenwriter
- Francesco Miccichè (politician), (born 1958), Italian politician and physician
