= Pio Vittorio Vigo =

Italian bishop (1935–2021)

His Excellency Pio Vittorio Vigo
- Archbishop-Bishop emeritus of Acireale
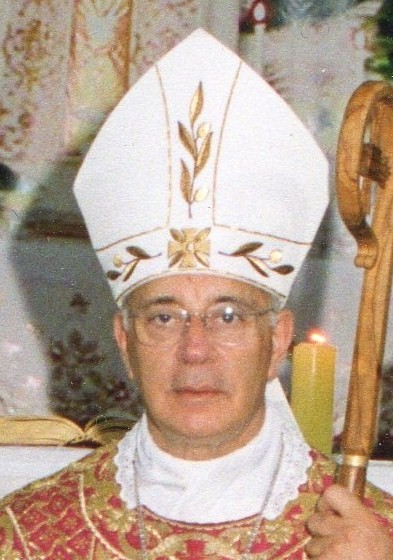
- Church: Roman Catholic Church
- Diocese: Roman Catholic Diocese of Acireale
- Installed: 30 November 2002
- Term ended: 26 July 2011
- Successor: Antonino Raspanti

Orders
- Consecration: 14 February 1981 by Cardinal Salvatore Pappalardo

Personal details
- Born: Pio Vittorio Vigo; 4 November 1935 Acireale, Sicily, Kingdom of Italy
- Died: 30 April 2021 (aged 86) Verona, Veneto, Italy
- Motto: In simplicitate cordis

Pio Vittorio Vigo (4 November 1935 – 30 April 2021) was an Italian Roman Catholic Archbishop (personal title) emeritus of Acireale in the Province of Catania. He was installed as bishop of the diocese on 30 November 2002, having been nominated on 15 October of the same year.

Due to his advanced age, he tendered his resignation as bishop of the diocese on 26 July 2011. He was replaced by Monsignor Antonino Raspanti, who assumed office on 1 October 2011.

== Clerical history ==
On 20 September 1958, at the age of 22, he was ordained as a Roman Catholic priest. Less than 23 years later on 13 January 1981 he was elected titular Bishop of Astigi, Spain and auxiliary Bishop of Catania. He was consecrated a bishop on 14 February 1981 at Acireale Cathedral by Cardinal Salvatore Pappalardo. In 1985 he was nominated Bishop of Nicosia, in 1997, he was appointed Archbishop of Monreale, and on 15 October 2002 he was nominated Bishop of Acireale. On 30 November 2002, he was installed as bishop, replacing Salvatore Gristina who as of 2009 serves as Archbishop of Catania.

The Diocese of Acireale is a suffragan of the Archdiocese of Catania. It was formed on 27 June 1844, but the first bishop was not appointed until 1872. As of 2006, the diocese contained 111 parishes and 171 priests.

On 26 July 2011, Pope Benedict XVI accepted his resignation, which was tendered on account of his advanced age. Monsignor Antonino Raspanti (born Alcamo 20 June 1959) was appointed his successor and assumed office on 1 October 2011.

Vigo studied philosophy at the Pontifical Gregorian University in Rome and served as a professor of philosophy at the Seminary of Acireale from 1958 to 1981. He had also written many religious texts which have been published. His personal motto was: In Simplicitate Cordis.

Vigo died in April 2021, at the age of 86.

== works by Pio Vigo ==
- Gocce di vita, Benedettine di Priscilla, 1966
- Ancora e giorno, Catania, Tringale, 1982
- Cattedrale aperta, Monreale, 1998
- Scintille di gioia, Palermo, Il pantocratore, 2000
- Mani cariche di canto, Palermo, La Palma, 2003
- Il testamento di Gesù: le ultime sette parole, Palermo, Alba, 2003
- Offrire il silenzio, Palermo, Abadir, 2006
- Briciole, Palermo, Abadir, 2008
