= 2017–18 EFL League One =

EFL League One
- Season: 2017–18
- Champions: Wigan Athletic (3rd divisional title)
- Promoted: Wigan Athletic; Blackburn Rovers; Rotherham United
- Relegated: Bury; Milton Keynes Dons; Northampton Town; Oldham Athletic
- Matches: 552
- Goals: 1,401 (2.54 per match)
- Top goalscorer: Jack Marriott (Peterborough United) (27 goals)
- Biggest home win: Rotherham United 5–0 Southend United (12 August 2017); Blackpool 5–0 Bradford City (7 April 2018)
- Biggest away win: Oxford United 0–7; Wigan Athletic (23 December 2017)
- Longest winning run: Rotherham United (7 matches)
- Longest unbeaten run: Blackburn Rovers (18 matches)
- Longest winless run: Plymouth Argyle (12 matches)
- Longest losing run: Bury (7 matches)
- Highest attendance: (Regular season) = 27,600 (Blackburn Rovers 2–1 Oxford United, 5 May 2018)
- Lowest attendance: (Regular season) = 2,088 (Fleetwood Town 0–2 Gillingham, 22 December 2017)
- Total attendance: 4,291,654
- Average attendance: (Regular season) = 7,788

The 2017–18 EFL League One (referred to as the Sky Bet League One for sponsorship reasons) was the 14th season of the Football League One under its current title, and the 25th season under its current league division format.

== Team changes ==
The following teams have changed division since the 2016–17 season.

=== To League One ===
Promoted from League Two

- Portsmouth
- Plymouth Argyle
- Doncaster Rovers
- Blackpool

Relegated from Championship

- Blackburn Rovers
- Wigan Athletic
- Rotherham United

=== From League One ===
Promoted to Championship

- Sheffield United
- Bolton Wanderers
- Millwall

Relegated to League Two

- Port Vale
- Swindon Town
- Coventry City
- Chesterfield

== Teams ==
Locations of the 2017–18 Football League One teams
Greater Manchester League One football clubs

Team	Location	Stadium	Capacity
AFC Wimbledon	London (Kingston upon Thames)	Kingsmeadow	4,850
Blackburn Rovers	Blackburn	Ewood Park	31,367
Blackpool	Blackpool	Bloomfield Road	17,338
Bradford City	Bradford	Valley Parade	25,136
Bristol Rovers	Bristol	Memorial Stadium	12,300
Bury	Bury	Gigg Lane	11,840
Charlton Athletic	London (Charlton)	The Valley	27,111
Doncaster Rovers	Doncaster	Keepmoat Stadium	15,231
Fleetwood Town	Fleetwood	Highbury Stadium	5,311
Gillingham	Gillingham	Priestfield Stadium	11,582
Milton Keynes Dons	Milton Keynes	Stadium MK	30,500
Northampton Town	Northampton	Sixfields Stadium	7,653
Oldham Athletic	Oldham	Boundary Park	13,512
Oxford United	Oxford	Kassam Stadium	12,500
Peterborough United	Peterborough	ABAX Stadium	14,084
Plymouth Argyle	Plymouth	Home Park	19,500
Portsmouth	Portsmouth	Fratton Park	21,100
Rochdale	Rochdale	Spotland Stadium	10,500
Rotherham United	Rotherham	New York Stadium	12,021
Scunthorpe United	Scunthorpe	Glanford Park	9,088
Shrewsbury Town	Shrewsbury	New Meadow	9,875
Southend United	Southend	Roots Hall	12,392
Walsall	Walsall	Bescot Stadium	11,300
Wigan Athletic	Wigan	DW Stadium	25,133

== Managerial changes ==
Team	Outgoing manager	Manner of departure	Date of vacancy	Position in table	Incoming manager	Date of appointment
Wigan Athletic	(England) Graham Barrow	Mutual consent	30 May 2017	Pre-season	(England) Paul Cook	31 May 2017
Portsmouth	(England) Paul Cook	Signed by Wigan Athletic	31 May 2017	Pre-season	(Wales) Kenny Jackett	2 June 2017
Oxford United	(England) Michael Appleton	Signed by Leicester City as assistant manager	20 June 2017	Pre-season	(Spain) Pep Clotet	1 July 2017
Northampton Town	(England) Justin Edinburgh	Sacked	31 August 2017	24th	(Netherlands) Jimmy Floyd Hasselbaink	4 September 2017
Oldham Athletic	(Republic of Ireland) John Sheridan	Mutual consent	25 September 2017	24th	(England) Richie Wellens	18 October 2017
Gillingham	(England) Adrian Pennock	Mutual consent	25 September 2017	22nd	(Wales) Steve Lovell	16 November 2017
Bury	(England) Lee Clark	Sacked	30 October 2017	23rd	(England) Chris Lucketti	22 November 2017
Bury	(England) Chris Lucketti	Sacked	15 January 2018	24th	(England) Ryan Lowe	15 January 2018
Southend United	(England) Phil Brown	Resigned	17 January 2018	18th	(England) Chris Powell	23 January 2018
Milton Keynes Dons	(Scotland) Robbie Neilson	Sacked	20 January 2018	21st	(England) Dan Micciche	23 January 2018
Oxford United	(Spain) Pep Clotet	Sacked	22 January 2018	10th	(England) Karl Robinson	22 March 2018
Bradford City	(Scotland) Stuart McCall	Sacked	5 February 2018	6th	(England) Simon Grayson	11 February 2018
Fleetwood Town	(Germany) Uwe Rösler	Sacked	16 February 2018	20th	(Republic of Ireland) John Sheridan	22 February 2018
Peterborough United	(Northern Ireland) Grant McCann	Sacked	25 February 2018	10th	(Scotland) Steve Evans	28 February 2018
Walsall	(England) Jon Whitney	Sacked	12 March 2018	14th	(England) Dean Keates	16 March 2018
Charlton Athletic	(England) Karl Robinson	Signed by Oxford United	22 March 2018	9th	(England) Lee Bowyer	22 March 2018
Scunthorpe United	(Scotland) Graham Alexander	Sacked	24 March 2018	5th	(England) Nick Daws	11 April 2018
Northampton Town	(Netherlands) Jimmy Floyd Hasselbaink	Sacked	2 April 2018	23rd	(England) Dean Austin	2 April 2018
Milton Keynes Dons	(England) Dan Micciche	Sacked	22 April 2018	23rd	(England) Paul Tisdale	6 June 2018

== League table ==
Pos	Team	Pld	W	D	L	GF	GA	GD	Pts	Promotion, qualification or relegation
1	Wigan Athletic (C, P)	46	29	11	6	89	29	+60	98	Promotion to the EFL Championship
2	Blackburn Rovers (P)	46	28	12	6	82	40	+42	96	Promotion to the EFL Championship
3	Shrewsbury Town	46	25	12	9	60	39	+21	87	Qualification for League One play-offs (Note: Four teams play for one spot and promotion to the EFL Championship.)
4	Rotherham United (O, P)	46	24	7	15	73	53	+20	79	Qualification for League One play-offs
5	Scunthorpe United	46	19	17	10	65	50	+15	74	Qualification for League One play-offs
6	Charlton Athletic	46	20	11	15	58	51	+7	71	Qualification for League One play-offs
7	Plymouth Argyle	46	19	11	16	58	59	−1	68	
8	Portsmouth	46	20	6	20	57	56	+1	66	
9	Peterborough United	46	17	13	16	68	60	+8	64	
10	Southend United	46	17	12	17	58	62	−4	63	
11	Bradford City	46	18	9	19	57	67	−10	63	
12	Blackpool	46	15	15	16	60	55	+5	60	
13	Bristol Rovers	46	16	11	19	60	66	−6	59	
14	Fleetwood Town	46	16	9	21	59	68	−9	57	
15	Doncaster Rovers	46	13	17	16	52	52	0	56	
16	Oxford United	46	15	11	20	61	66	−5	56	
17	Gillingham	46	13	17	16	50	55	−5	56	
18	AFC Wimbledon	46	13	14	19	47	58	−11	53	
19	Walsall	46	13	13	20	53	66	−13	52	
20	Rochdale	46	11	18	17	49	57	−8	51	
21	Oldham Athletic (R)	46	11	17	18	58	75	−17	50	Relegation to EFL League Two
22	Northampton Town (R)	46	12	11	23	43	77	−34	47	Relegation to EFL League Two
23	Milton Keynes Dons (R)	46	11	12	23	43	69	−26	45	Relegation to EFL League Two
24	Bury (R)	46	8	12	26	41	71	−30	36	Relegation to EFL League Two

Source: BBC Sport
Rules for classification: 1) Points; 2) Goal difference; 3) Number of goals scored
(C) Champions; (O) Play-off winners; (P) Promoted; (R) Relegated

== Play-offs ==
Semi-finals
3	Shrewsbury Town	1	1	2
6	Charlton Athletic	0	0	0
4	Rotherham United	2	2	4
5	Scunthorpe United	2	0	2

Final
3	Shrewsbury Town	1
4	Rotherham United	2

== Results ==
Home \ Away	WIM	BLB	BLP	BRA	BRR	BRY	CHA	DON	FLE	GIL	MKD	NOR	OLD	OXF	PET	PLY	POR	ROC	ROT	SCU	SHR	STD	WAL	WIG
AFC Wimbledon		0–3	2–0	2–1	1–0	2–2	1–0	2–0	0–1	1–1	0–2	1–3	2–2	2–1	2–2	0–1	0–2	0–0	3–1	1–1	0–1	2–0	1–2	0–4
Blackburn Rovers	0–1		3–0	2–0	2–1	2–0	2–0	1–3	2–2	1–0	4–1	1–1	2–2	2–1	3–1	1–1	3–0	2–0	2–0	2–2	3–1	1–0	3–1	2–2
Blackpool	1–0	2–4		5–0	0–0	2–1	1–0	1–2	2–1	1–1	1–0	3–0	2–1	3–1	1–1	2–2	2–3	0–0	1–2	2–3	1–1	1–1	2–2	1–3
Bradford City	0–4	0–1	2–1		3–1	2–2	0–1	2–0	0–3	1–0	2–0	1–2	1–1	3–2	1–3	0–1	3–1	4–3	1–0	1–2	0–0	0–2	1–1	0–1
Bristol Rovers	1–3	1–1	3–1	3–1		2–1	1–1	0–1	3–1	1–1	2–0	1–1	2–3	0–1	1–4	2–1	2–1	3–2	2–1	1–1	1–2	3–0	2–1	1–1
Bury	2–1	0–3	1–1	3–1	2–3		0–1	0–1	0–2	2–1	0–2	2–3	2–2	3–0	0–1	0–0	1–0	0–2	0–3	0–1	1–0	0–0	1–0	0–2
Charlton Athletic	1–0	1–0	1–1	1–1	1–0	1–1		1–0	0–0	1–2	2–2	4–1	1–0	2–3	2–2	2–0	0–1	2–1	3–1	0–1	0–2	2–1	3–1	0–3
Doncaster Rovers	0–0	0–1	3–3	2–0	1–3	3–3	1–1		3–0	0–0	2–1	3–0	1–1	0–1	0–0	1–1	2–1	2–0	1–1	0–1	1–2	4–1	0–3	0–1
Fleetwood Town	2–0	1–2	0–0	1–2	2–0	3–2	1–3	0–0		0–2	1–1	2–0	2–2	2–0	2–3	1–1	1–2	2–2	2–0	2–3	1–2	2–4	2–0	0–4
Gillingham	2–2	0–0	0–3	0–1	4–1	1–1	1–0	0–0	2–1		1–2	1–2	0–0	1–1	1–1	5–2	0–1	2–1	0–1	0–0	1–2	3–3	0–0	1–1
Milton Keynes Dons	0–0	1–2	0–0	1–4	0–1	2–1	1–2	1–2	1–0	1–0		0–0	4–4	1–1	1–0	0–1	1–2	3–2	3–2	0–2	1–1	1–1	1–1	0–1
Northampton Town	0–1	1–1	1–0	0–1	0–6	0–0	0–4	1–0	0–1	1–2	2–1		2–2	0–0	1–4	2–0	3–1	0–1	0–3	0–3	1–1	3–1	2–1	0–1
Oldham Athletic	0–0	1–0	2–1	2–1	1–1	2–1	3–4	0–0	1–2	1–1	1–0	5–1		0–2	3–2	1–2	0–2	3–1	1–1	2–3	1–2	0–3	1–1	0–2
Oxford United	3–0	2–4	1–0	2–2	1–2	1–2	1–1	1–0	0–1	3–0	3–1	1–2	0–0		2–1	0–1	3–0	2–1	3–3	1–1	1–1	2–0	1–2	0–7
Peterborough United	1–1	2–3	0–1	1–3	1–1	3–0	4–1	1–1	2–0	0–1	2–0	2–0	3–0	1–4		2–1	2–1	0–1	2–1	2–2	1–0	0–1	2–1	3–2
Plymouth Argyle	4–2	2–0	1–3	1–0	3–2	3–0	2–0	0–3	1–2	2–1	0–1	2–0	4–1	0–4	2–1		0–0	1–1	2–1	0–4	1–1	4–0	1–0	1–3
Portsmouth	2–1	1–2	0–2	0–1	3–0	1–0	0–1	2–2	4–1	1–3	2–0	3–1	1–2	3–0	2–0	1–0		2–0	0–1	1–1	0–1	1–0	1–1	2–1
Rochdale	1–1	0–3	1–2	1–1	1–0	0–0	1–0	2–1	0–2	3–0	0–0	2–2	0–0	0–0	2–0	1–1	3–3		0–1	1–1	3–1	0–0	1–1	1–4
Rotherham United	2–0	1–1	1–0	2–0	2–0	3–2	0–2	2–1	3–2	1–3	2–1	1–0	5–1	3–1	1–1	1–1	1–0	0–1		2–0	1–2	5–0	5–1	1–3
Scunthorpe United	1–1	0–1	0–0	1–1	1–0	1–0	2–0	1–1	1–1	1–3	2–2	2–2	0–2	1–0	2–1	2–0	2–0	1–1	1–2		1–2	3–1	1–0	1–2
Shrewsbury Town	1–0	1–1	1–0	0–1	4–0	1–1	0–2	2–2	1–0	1–1	0–1	1–0	1–0	3–2	3–1	1–2	2–0	3–2	0–1	2–0		1–0	2–0	1–0
Southend United	1–0	2–1	2–1	1–2	0–0	1–0	3–1	0–0	1–2	4–0	4–0	2–2	2–0	1–1	1–1	1–1	3–1	0–0	2–0	3–2	1–2		0–3	3–1
Walsall	2–3	1–2	1–1	3–3	0–0	1–0	2–2	4–2	4–2	0–1	1–0	1–0	2–1	2–1	1–1	2–1	0–1	0–3	1–2	1–0	1–1	0–1		0–3
Wigan Athletic	1–1	0–0	0–2	1–2	3–0	4–1	0–0	3–0	2–0	2–0	5–1	1–0	3–0	1–0	0–0	1–0	1–1	1–0	0–0	3–3	0–0	3–0	2–0	

Updated to match(es) played on 1 May 2018. Source: BBC Sport
Legend: Blue = home team win; Yellow = draw; Red = away team win.

== Top scorers ==
As of 24 April 2018

Rank	Player	Club	Goals
1	(England) Jack Marriott	Peterborough United	27
2	(Jersey) Brett Pitman	Portsmouth	24
3	(Northern Ireland) Will Grigg	Wigan Athletic	19
4	(England) Bradley Dack	Blackburn Rovers	18
5	(England) Tom Eaves	Gillingham	17
6	(England) Charlie Wyke	Bradford City	15
6	(England) Erhun Oztumer	Walsall	15
6	(England) Nick Powell	Wigan Athletic	15
9	(Republic of Ireland) Graham Carey	Plymouth Argyle	14
9	(England) Danny Graham	Blackburn Rovers	14
9	(Republic of Ireland) Eoin Doyle	Oldham Athletic	14
9	(Montserrat) Lyle Taylor	AFC Wimbledon	14
9	(Scotland) Charlie Mulgrew	Blackburn Rovers	14
9	(England) John Marquis	Doncaster Rovers	14

== Attendances ==
#	Club	Average attendance	Highest	Lowest
1	Bradford City AFC	19,787	21,403	18,799
2	Portsmouth FC	17,917	19,210	17,118
3	Blackburn Rovers FC	12,832	27,600	10,011
4	Charlton Athletic FC	11,846	17,581	8,801
5	Plymouth Argyle FC	10,413	14,634	7,411
6	Milton Keynes Dons FC	9,202	14,762	7,258
7	Wigan Athletic FC	9,152	12,554	7,777
8	Bristol Rovers FC	8,933	10,029	7,531
9	Rotherham United FC	8,514	11,725	7,330
10	Doncaster Rovers FC	8,213	12,481	7,013
11	Oxford United FC	7,376	9,510	6,337
12	Southend United FC	7,195	9,588	5,608
13	Shrewsbury Town FC	6,249	8,202	4,666
14	Northampton Town FC	5,830	7,231	4,788
15	Peterborough United FC	5,669	8,619	2,531
16	Gillingham FC	5,370	8,163	4,002
17	Walsall FC	4,760	8,919	3,225
18	Oldham Athletic FC	4,442	7,784	2,975
19	Scunthorpe United FC	4,364	6,359	3,120
20	AFC Wimbledon	4,325	4,850	3,819
21	Blackpool FC	4,178	7,371	2,650
22	Bury FC	3,931	7,159	2,784
23	Rochdale AFC	3,471	6,524	2,138
24	Fleetwood Town FC	3,140	5,035	2,088
