= Chapelle de l'Oratoire, Nantes =

Former chapel in Nantes, France

Chapelle de l'Oratoire
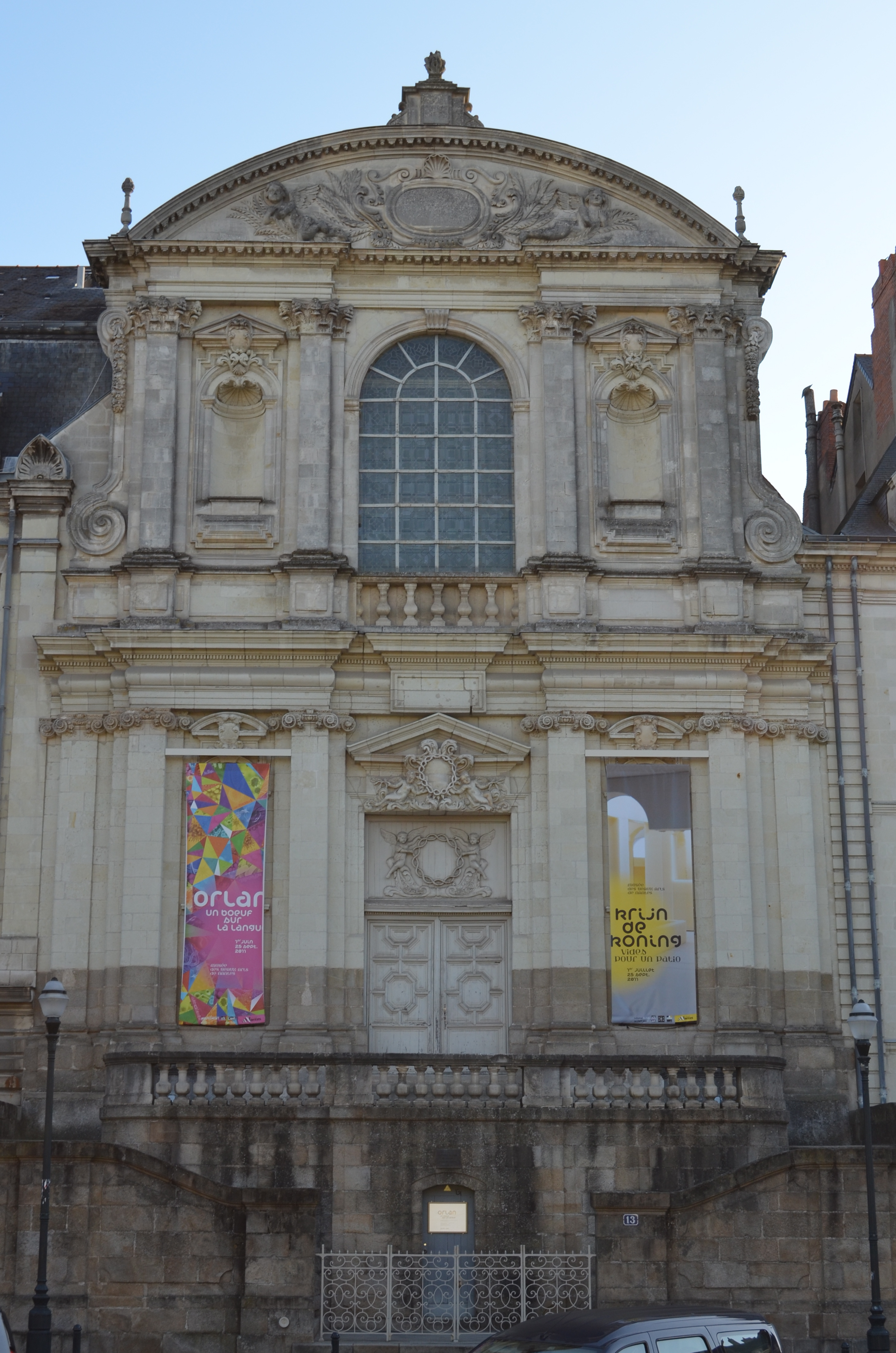
- Chapelle de l'Oratoire
- Interactive map of Chapelle de l'Oratoire
- Location: Nantes, Brittany, Loire-Atlantique
- Coordinates: 47°13′09″N 1°32′54″W
- Designer: Jacques Malherbe, Gilles Corbineau
- Type: Museum
- Beginning date: 1651–1665; 1775
- Dedicated to: Catholic Church (Oratorians)
- MH listed (1952)

The Chapelle de l’Oratoire is a former chapel of the Oratorians, dating from the 17th century, in Nantes, France. The chapel is located at Place de l'Oratoire, in the Malakoff-Saint-Donatien district, on the periphery of the city center, with Rue Henri-IV marking the boundary between these two districts. Incorporated into the Hôtel le Lasseur in 1775, the chapel was subsequently classified as a historic monument in 1952. The building is no longer used for religious purposes and has been incorporated into the city's Museum of Fine Arts.

== History ==
In 1619, the Oratorians relocated to Nantes, where they were compelled by the municipal authorities to identify a location outside the city walls. They procured the Hayes estate, consisting of three buildings in a vast enclosure. Additionally, they assumed control of two-thirds of the Mironnerie, a property constructed for François Myron (or Miron), who served as the general treasurer of Brittany and mayor of Nantes from 1578 to 1580. In 1625, the city bestowed upon them the responsibility of administering the educational affairs of the Saint-Clément College, a position they retained until 1793, ultimately surpassing their rivals, the Jesuits. Beginning in 1630, the Oratorians initiated a series of construction projects, culminating in erecting a chapel.

The construction of this chapel commenced between 1651 and 1665, and it was consecrated in the latter year. It was erected during the Counter-Reformation movement and was subsequently owned by the Oratory congregation until 1793. The architect responsible for its design was Jacques Malherbe, and following his demise, Gilles Corbineau assumed control of the project.

In 1765, architect Jean-Baptiste Ceineray devised the design for the Saint-Pierre and Saint-André courtyards. The necessity for constructing a staircase arose from the leveling of the Place de l'Oratoire, as the ground level had been lowered. Furthermore, Ceineray formulated the blueprint for the Hôtel le Lasseur in 1775, situated adjacent to the chapel on its southern facade.

Following its designation as national property, the building served as the seat of the criminal court of Loire-Inférieure during the French Revolution. It subsequently functioned as a gendarmerie barracks, an archive depot, and an archaeology museum.

In the early months of 1848, the recently appointed prefect, Ange Guépin, assigned the management of the chapel to a workers' club known as the "National and Labor Organization Club." This group subsequently became known as the "Oratory Club", in contrast to the "Rue du Calvaire Club", which represented the liberal professions. Following the overthrow of Louis-Philippe I, these political clubs were established in Nantes in preparation for the inaugural elections of the Second Republic. The Oratory Club was influenced by Fourierism, "brotherhood communism", and "Icarian communism."

In 1858, the northern facade of the chapel was incorporated into the structure of another building, the Hôtel de Sesmaisons-Lucinge. From that point forward, the chapel's facade was surrounded by the imposing presence of two substantial buildings.

In 1945, the cathedral, damaged by Allied bombings during World War II, was closed for repairs. During this period, the chapel was used for a variety of religious ceremonies, including Catholic weddings, funerals, and baptisms (using a basin as a baptismal font). Following the cathedral's reopening, the Chapelle de l’Oratoire served as a mortuary chapel for soldiers killed in the Indochina and Algerian wars.

On 28 March 1952, the chapel was designated a historic monument by a decree. It is regarded as a constituent element of the Hôtel le Lasseur and is not cataloged separately in the Mérimée database.

The edifice underwent a restoration process between the years 1970 and 1988, during which it was transformed into a venue for conferences, concerts, and exhibitions. Subsequently, it became an annex to the Nantes Museum of Fine Arts.

Between 25 September 2011, and the conclusion of 2013, the museum underwent an expansion, encompassing the incorporation of intermediate edifices that facilitated connectivity between its "historic" section and the Chapelle de l’Oratoire. Throughout this period, the chapel served as the sole accessible component of the site, serving as a venue for both exhibitions and events.

== Architecture and Decoration ==
The chapel design was the work of the superior of the congregation at the time, Abel de Sainte-Marthe. Following the canons of the Counter-Reformation, the plan is simple: the building has no side aisles or ambulatory. However, the facade, inspired by the Baroque style, is animated and adorned with pilasters. Inside, Corinthian pilasters are found, where sculpted angel heads contribute to the decor.

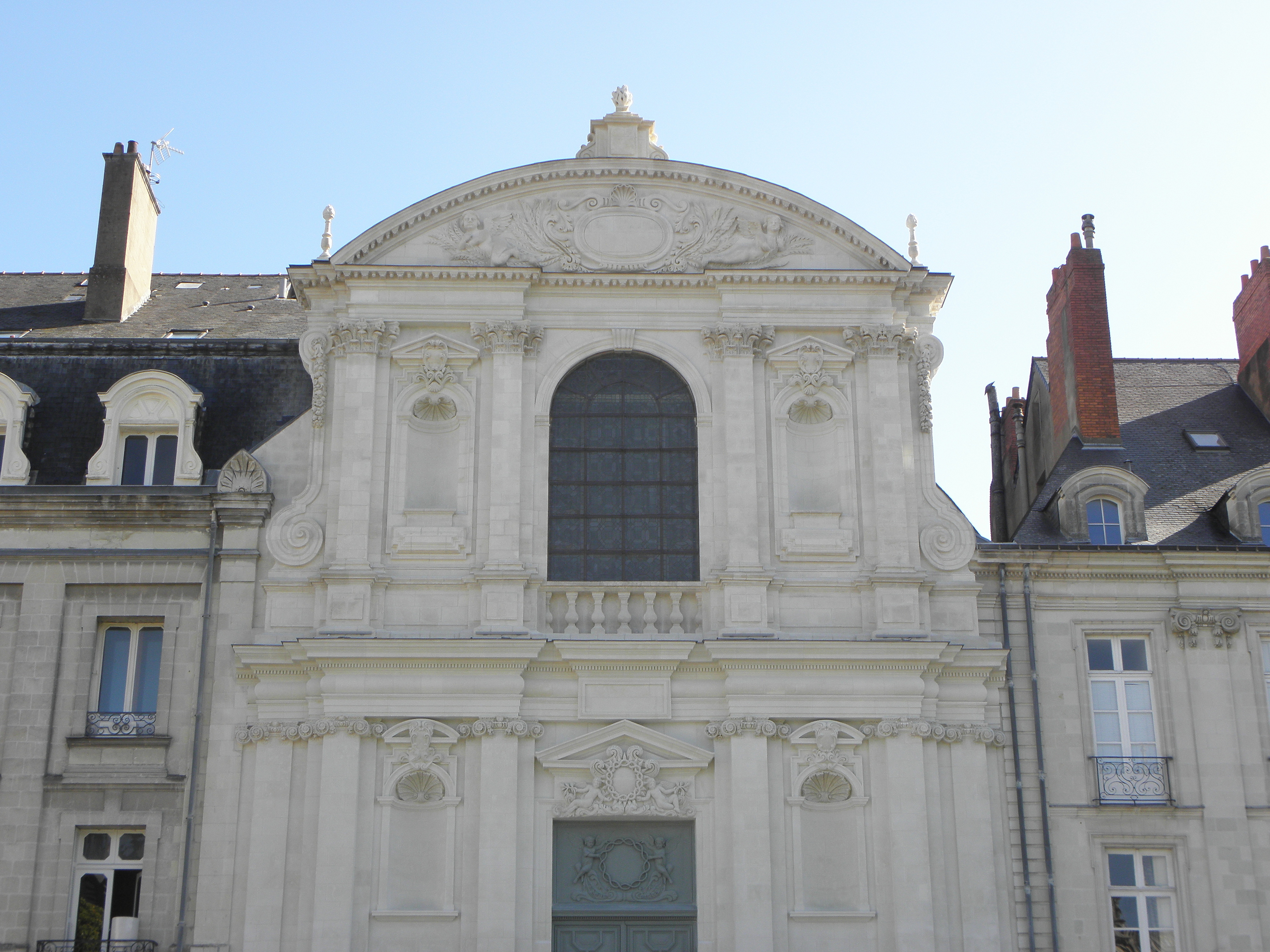

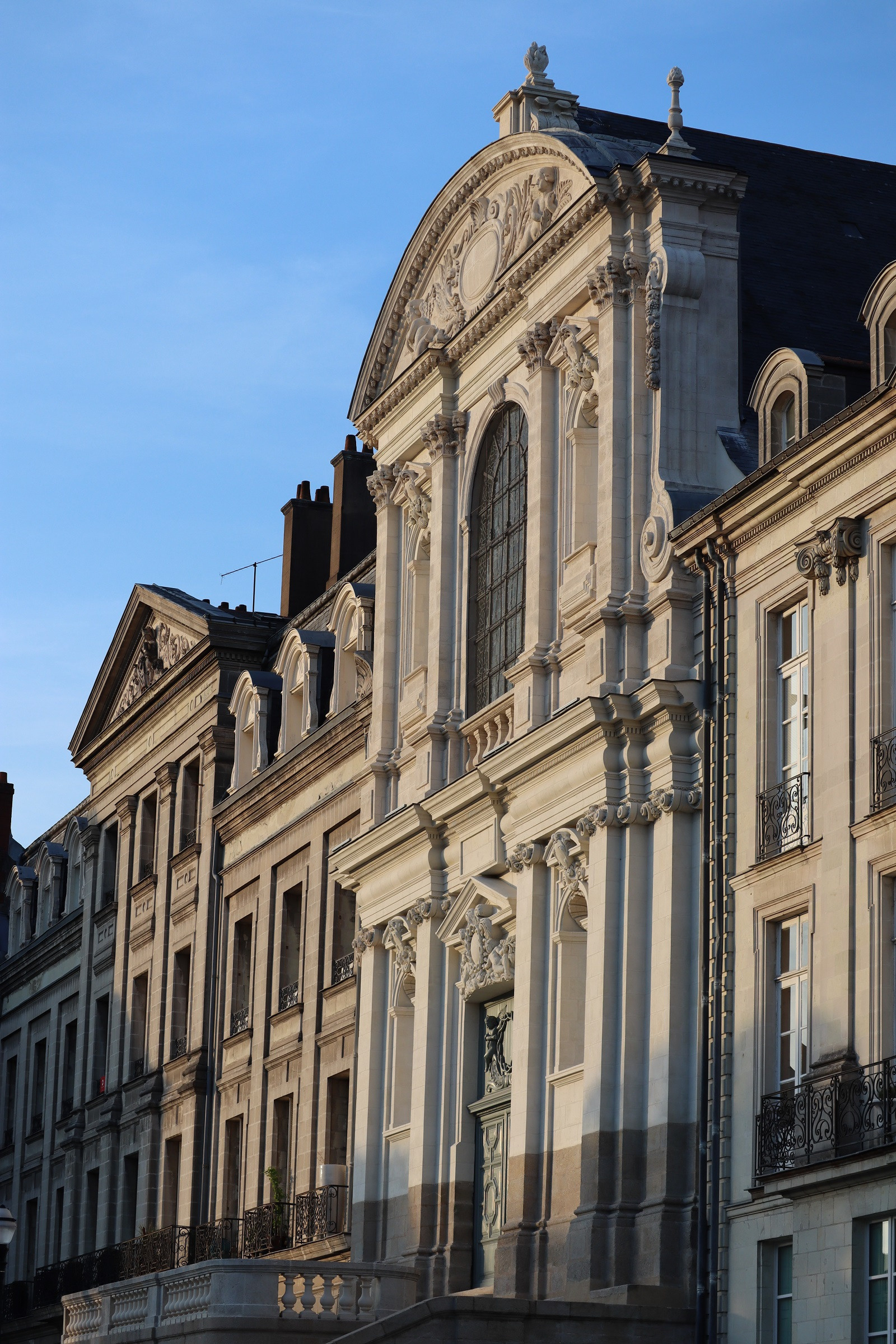

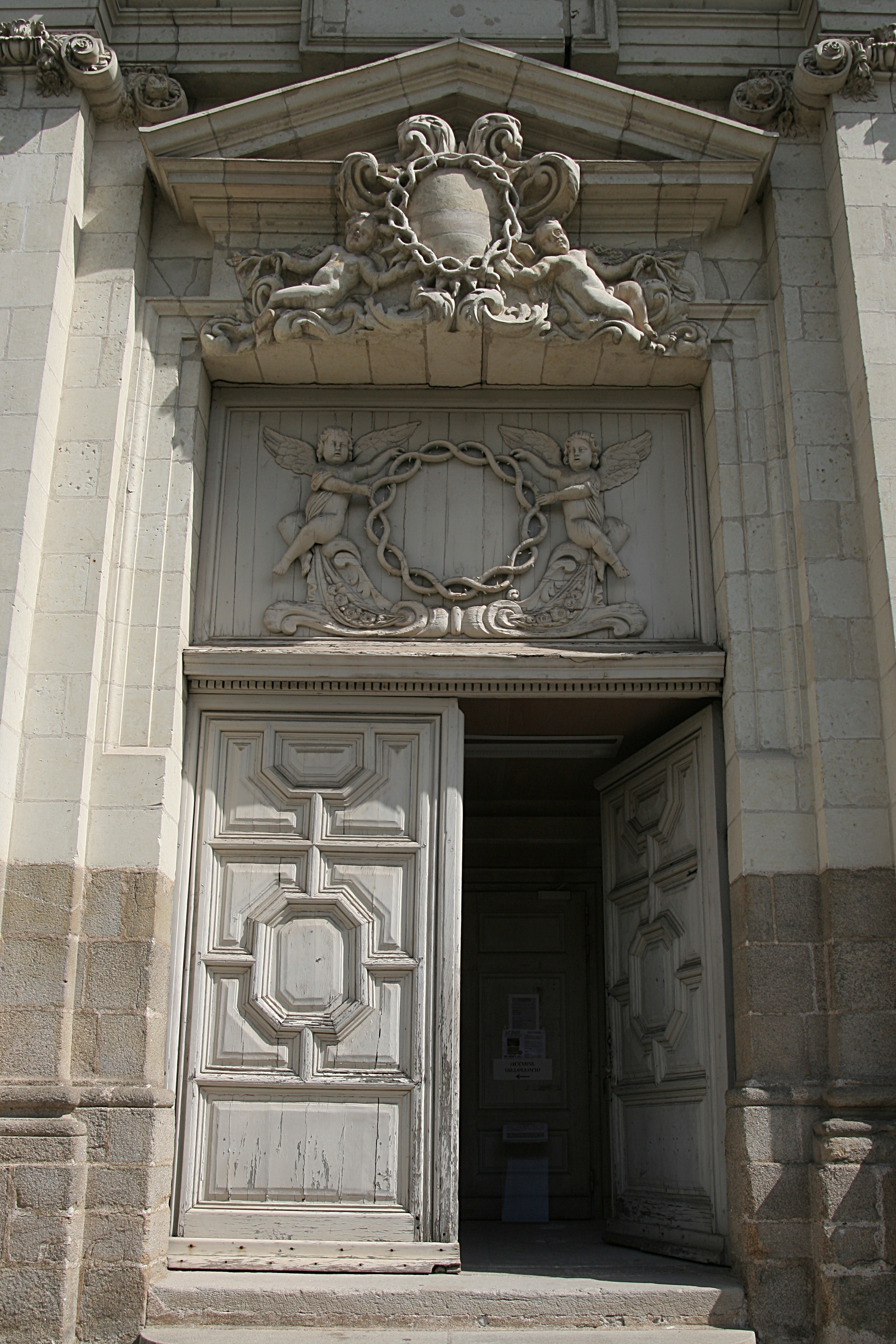

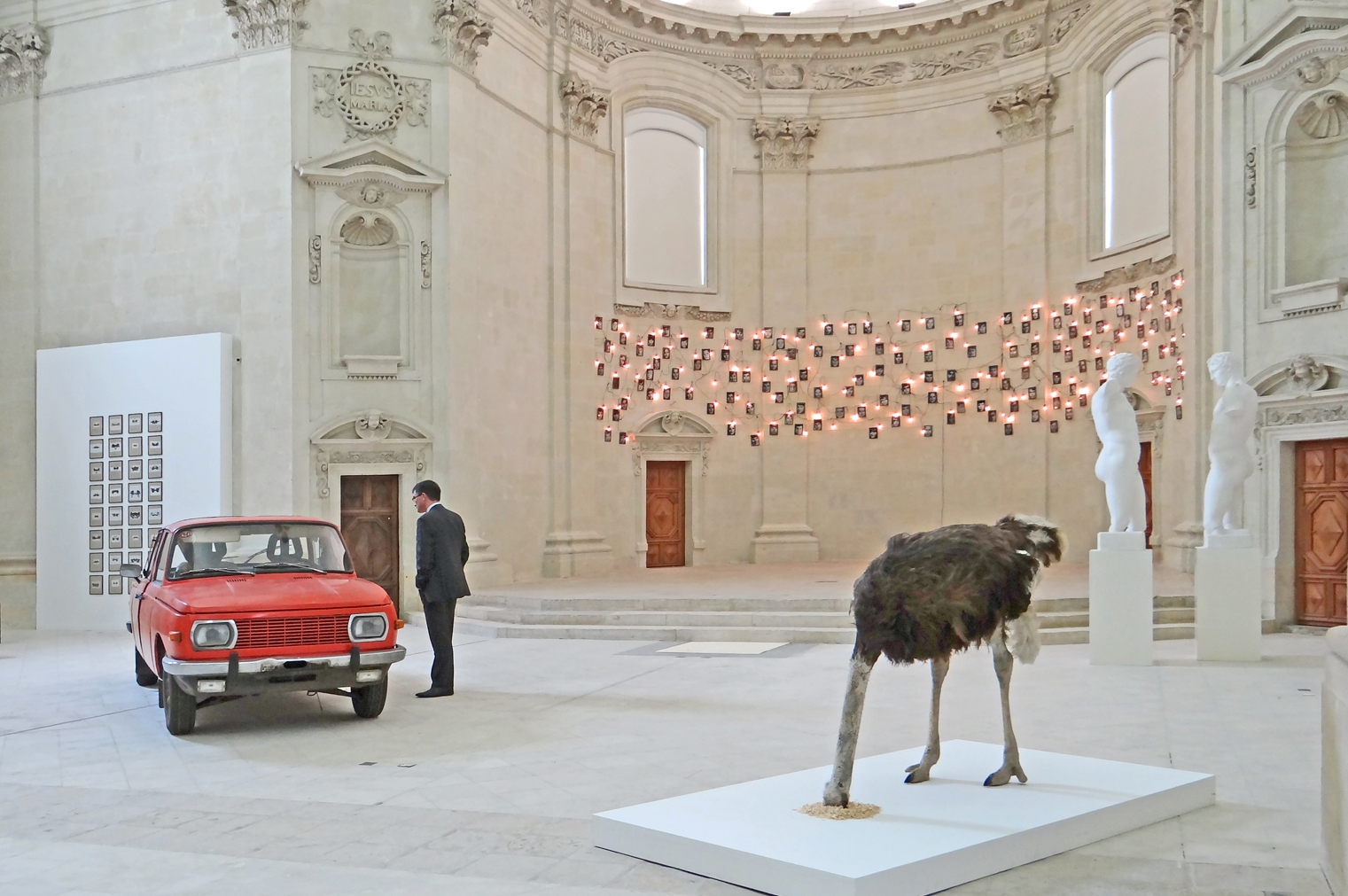

== Bibliography ==
- Aussel, Michel (2002). Nantes sous la Monarchie de Juillet : 1830–1848 : du mouvement mutualiste aux doctrines politiques [Nantes under the July Monarchy: 1830-1848: from the mutualist movement to political doctrines] (in French). Nantes: Ouest éditions. ISBN 2-908261-78-2.
- Flohic, Jean-Luc (1999). Le Patrimoine des communes de la Loire-Atlantique [The heritage of Loire-Atlantique communes]. Le patrimoine des communes de France (in French). Vol. 2. Charenton-le-Pont: Flohic éditions. ISBN 2-84234-040-X.
- Pajot, Stéphane (2010). Nantes, histoire de rues [Nantes, street history] (in French). Les Sables d'Olonne: d'Orbestier. ISBN 978-2-84238-126-4.
- Pied, Édouard (1906). Notices sur les rues de Nantes [Notes on the streets of Nantes] (in French). A. Dugas. p. 218.
- Saupin, Guy (2008). "Couvents tridentins et forme urbaine : Nantes du XVIIe au XIXe siècle" [Tridentine convents and urban form: Nantes from the 17th to the 19th century]. Nantes religieuse, de l'Antiquité chrétienne à nos jours : actes du colloque organisé à l'université de Nantes (19-20 octobre 2006) [Notes on the streets of NantesReligious Nantes, from Christian Antiquity to the present day: proceedings of the conference organized at the University of Nantes (October 19–20, 2006)]. Bulletin de la Société archéologique et historique de Nantes et de Loire-Atlantique (in French). Département d'histoire et d'archéologie de l'université de Nantes.
- Université de Nantes. Service formation continue dont université permanente (1984). Çà et là par les rues de Nantes [Here and there on the streets of Nantes] (in French). Nantes: Reflets du passé. ISBN 2-86507-016-6.
