= Colbasa =

Colbasa is a former Ancient city and bishopric, now a Latin Catholic titular see.

It was located near Göldeçiftlik, to the east of Antalya in modern Turkey.

== History ==
Colbasa was important enough in the Roman province of Pamphylia Secunda to become a suffragan bishopric of its capital Perge's Metropolitan Archbishop, but faded.

=== Titular see ===
The diocese was nominally restored in 1933 as a Latin titular bishopric.

It is vacant, having had only two incumbents, both of the lowest (episcopal) rank :

- Paul Marie Ro Ki-nam (노기남 바오로) (1942.11.10 – 1962.03.10) as Apostolic Vicar of Seul, also Apostolic Administrator of then Apostolic Vicariate of Taiku (South Korea) (1948.05.27 – 1948); later promoted first Metropolitan Archbishop of the same Seoul 서울 (South Korea) (1962.03.10 – 1967.03.23), President of Catholic Bishops’ Conference of Korea (1964 – 1967), emeritate as Titular Archbishop of Tituli in Proconsulari (1967.03.23 – 1971.03.10)
- Pasquale Bacile (1962.07.07 – 1964.07.05), as Auxiliary Bishop of Acireale (Italy) (1962.07.07 – 1964.07.05), later succeeded as Bishop of Acireale (1964.07.05 – 1979.11.30)

== See also ==
- Catholic Church in Turkey
