= Giovanni Battista Arista =

Italian clergyman and auxiliary bishop

Giovanni Battista Arista C.O.
- Bishop of Acireale
- Church: Catholic Church
- Diocese: Diocese of Acireale
- In office: 4 November 1907 – 27 September 1920
- Predecessor: Gerlando Maria Genuardi
- Successor: Salvatore Bella
- Previous posts: Titular Bishop of Nyssa (1904-1907); Auxiliary Bishop of Acireale (1904-1907)

Orders
- Ordination: 25 June 1888
- Consecration: 30 November 1904 by Gerlando Maria Genuardi

Personal details
- Born: Giovanni Battista Arista-Vigo; 2 April 1863 Palermo, Province of Palermo, Kingdom of Italy
- Died: 27 September 1920 (aged 57) Acireale, Province of Catania, Kingdom of Italy

Giovanni Battista Arista (born 2 Apr, 1863 in Palermo) was an Italian clergyman and auxiliary bishop for the Diocese of Acireale, and for Diocese of Nyssa. He was ordained a priest in 1888 and his appointment to the episcopate came 1904. He died in 1920.
