= Diocese of Acireale =

Roman Catholic diocese in Italy

Coordinates: 37.6167°N 15.1667°E

Diocese of Acireale Dioecesis Iaciensis

Catholic
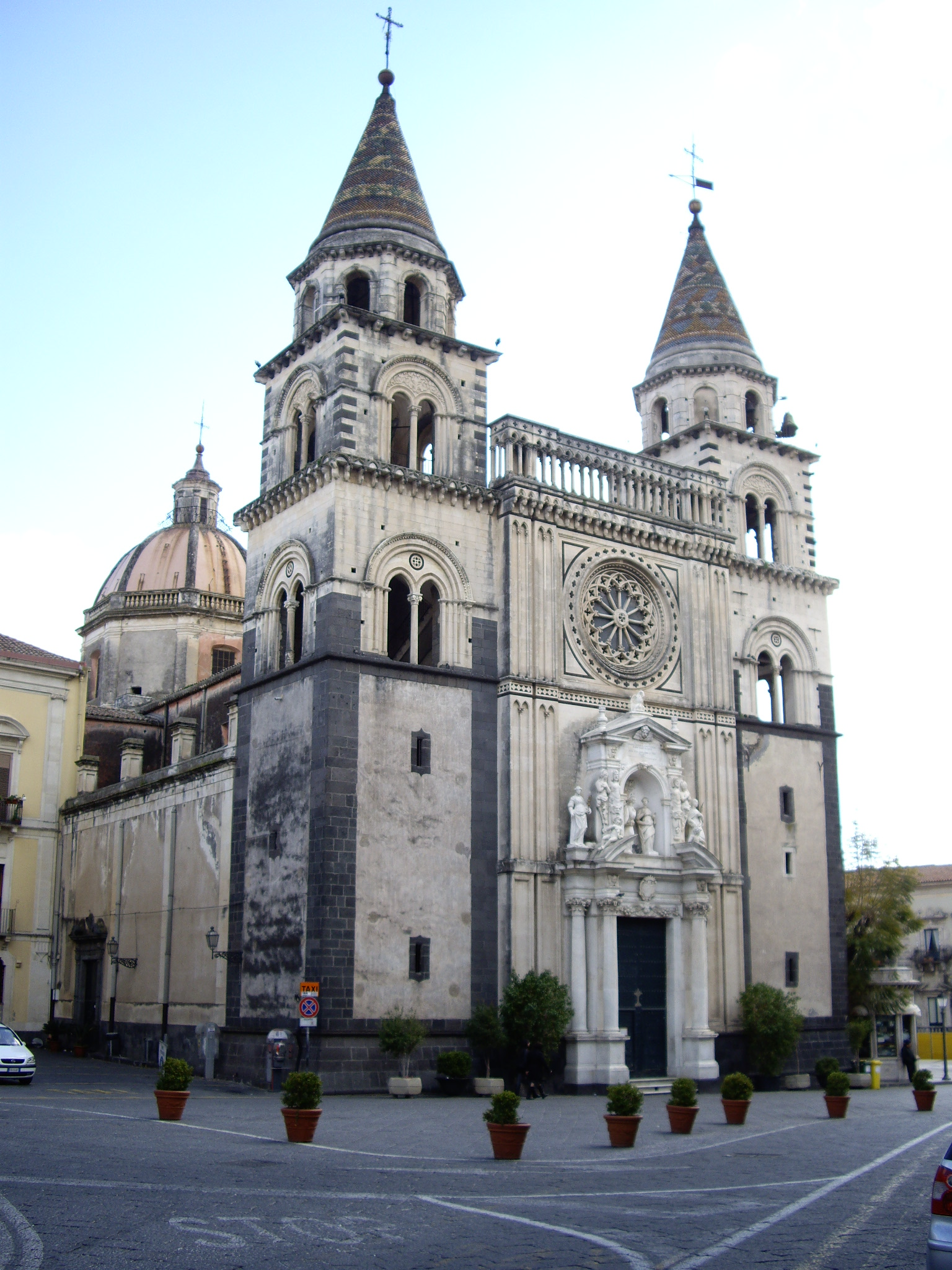
- Cathedral in Acireale

Location
- Country: Italy
- Ecclesiastical province: Catania

Statistics
- Area: 665 km^{2} (257 sq mi)
- Population: Total; Catholics: (as of 2023); 233,000 (est.) ▲; 229,000 (est.) ▼
- Parishes: 111

Information
- Denomination: Catholic Church
- Rite: Roman Rite
- Established: 27 June 1844 (182 years ago)
- Cathedral: Cattedrale di Maria SS. Annunziata

Current leadership
- Pope: Leo XIV
- Bishop: Antonino Raspanti

Map
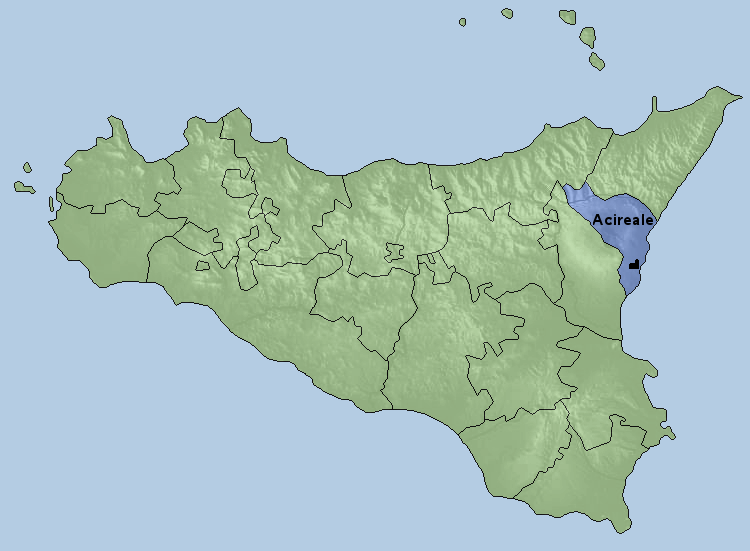

Website
- www.diocesiacireale.it

The Diocese of Acireale (Latin: Dioecesis Iaciensis) is a Latin Church diocese of the Catholic Church in Sicily. It existed on paper from 1844, though it was not actually founded and did not receive a bishop until 1872. From 1872 to 2000, Acireale was directly subject to the Holy See (Papacy). Since 2000, it is a suffragan of the archdiocese of Catania.

== History ==
In 1693, eastern Sicily was struck by a major earthquake, leaving considerable devastation. In Acireale, 739 persons in a population of 12,895 died. Only a third of the buildings remained standing. The church of S. Maria Annunziata was reduced to ruins, and had to be completely rebuilt.

In the mid-1850s, the population of the commune of Acireale was 21212 persons.

=== Plan for a diocese ===
On 27 June 1844, Pope Gregory XVI issued the bull "Quodcumque ad Catholicae," by which he established the diocese of Acireale ((Iacium). The territory of the new diocese was to be made up of five towns of the diocese of Catania, whose population exceeded 140,000: Aci-Reale, Aci-S. Antonio, Aci-Bonaccorso, Aci-Castello, and Aci-S. Filippo Catena; and from the diocese of Messana, whose pupulation exceed 234,000, eight towns: Calatabiano, Castiglione, Fiumefreddo, Giarre, Mascali, Piedimonte, Randazzo, and Linguaglossa.

The town (oppidum) of Acireale was to be raised to the rank of an episcopal city (civitas), and the Collegiate Church of the Annunciation (Beata Maria Virgo ab Angelo annunciata) was to be raised to the rank of a cathedral, where the seat of the new bishop of Acireale was to be located. It would continue to be a parish church as well. The new cathedral was to be fitted out with whatever was necessary for pontifical functions, as promised by the King of the Two Sicilies. The collegiate Chapter was to be abolished, and reconstituted as the cathedral Chapter, with all of its property and privileges to be transferred. The cathedral Chapter was to consist of three dignities and twelve prebendary canons, with two of the canons to be designated Theologus and Poenitentiarius, in accordance with the decrees of the Council of Trent.

The project was impeded by a number of events. In 1848, a revolution began with the arrival of Garibaldi in Palermo, leading to a brief independent Sicilian republic; Acireale was witness to the Bourbon reconquest. At the same time, Pope Pius IX was forced to flee from Rome (1848–1850), where a brief Roman republic was established. In 1860, the creation of a united Italy under the leadership of the king of Sardinia (Savoy), brought the overthrow of the Bourbon kingdom of the Two Sicilies, and the annexation of the entire Papal States (except the city of Rome) to the kingdom of Italy. In 1870, Rome was taken, and the pope left only the Leonine City.

=== Erection of the diocese ===
The implementation of the bull was deferred, however, until more favorable circumstances. There were strong objections from the bishop of Catania and the archbishop of Messina; and it was therefore stated in the bull that the bull would not take effect until after the death of the two prelates. Both died in 1861. Financing was another consideration. It was proposed that the new diocese be endowed, at least in part, through the suppression of tfhe abbey of S. Maria Roccamadore and the abbey of S. Maria La Novara, both defunct Cistercian establishments, and the reallocation of their properties and incomes.

On 22 July 1872, a consistorial decree was issued, with the approval of Pope Pius IX, declaring the diocese of Acireale to be directly subject to the Holy See. Bishop Giovanni Battista Guttadauro di Reburdone of Caltanissetta was appointed Apostolic Delegate of the pope to carry out the mandate to establish the diocese.

==== Episcopal seminary ====
After some difficulties with the civil authorities, the royal "exequatur" was obtained in 1880, and the episcopal seminary of Acireale was inaugurated by Bishop Gerlando Genuardi on 15 December 1881, in the premises that once housed the Collegio S. Martino. The original intention of the bishop was to have the Salesians serve as superiors, but that idea was not feasible. From 1883 to 1886, one of its undergraduate students was Dom Luigi Sturzo, the founder of the Partito Populare Italiano.

From 6 to 12 April 1891, a conference of the bishops of Sicily was held in Palermo, under the presidency of Cardinal Michelangelo Celsia, Archbishop of Palermo. It was attended by fifteen bishops, including Bishop Gerlando Genuardi of Acireale.

==== Minor basilicas ====
At the request of its canons and with the approval of Bishop Salvatore Russo, in the Apostolic Brief "Sacras inter Aedes" of 14 July 1933, Pope Pius XI granted the collegiate church of Saints Peter and Paul in Acireale the honorific title of "minor basilica."

On 27 November 1948, in the Apostolic Brief "Praeclara templa", Pope Pius XII granted the cathedral of S. Maria Annunziata in Acireale the honor and title of "minor basilica."

In the Apostolic Brief "Parens Auctoris" of 20 September 1957, Pope Pius XII granted the honor and title of "minor basilica" to the church of Santa Maria Assunta in Randazzo (diocese of Acireale).

The church of S. Pietro in the town of Riposto (diocese of Acireale) was granted the honor and title of "minor basilica" on 5 June 1967, by Pope Paul VI in the Apostolic Brief "Principi Apostolorum". The grant was made at the request of Bishop Pasquale Bacile.

At the request of Bishop Giuseppe Malandrino (1979–1998), Pope John Paul II granted the honor and title of "minor basilica" to the church of the Virgin Mary della Catena in Castiglione in the diocese of Acireale, on 30 October 1985.

Pope John Paul II granted the collegiate church of S. Sebastiano in Acireale the honor and title of "minor basilica in the Apostolic Brief "In Siciliae Vetustissima,", on 4 December 1990.

=== Suffragan ===
On 2 December 2000, Pope John Paul II ordered a new arrangement of the dioceses of Sicily. The diocese of Catania was promoted to the status of a mentroplitan archdiocese, and the diocese of Acireale, formerly directly subject to the Papacy, was made a suffragan diocese of Catania.

== Bishops ==
Sede vacante (1844–1872)

- Gerlando Maria Genuardi (1872–1907)
- Giovanni Battista Arista (1907–1920)
- Salvatore Bella (1920–1922)
- Fernando Cento (1922–1926)
- Evasio Colli (1927–1932)
- Salvatore Russo (1932–1964)
- Pasquale Bacile (1964–1979), also Titular bishop of Colbasa
- Giuseppe Malandrino (1979–1998)
- Salvatore Gristina (1999–2002)
- Pio Vittorio Vigo (2002–2011), Archbishop (personal title)
- Antonino Raspanti (2011–present)

== See also ==
- Acireale

== Sources ==
- Cappelletti, Giuseppe (1870). Le chiese d'Italia dalla loro origine sino ai nostri giorni (in Italian). Vol. vigesimoprimo (21). Venezia: Antonelli. p. 572.
- Ritzler, Remigius; Sefrin, Pirminus (1978). Hierarchia catholica Medii et recentioris aevi (in Latin). Vol. 8 (1846–1903). Il Messaggero di S. Antonio.
- Pięta, Zenon (2002). Hierarchia catholica medii et recentioris aevi (in Latin). Vol. 9 (1903–1922). Padua: Messagero di San Antonio. ISBN 978-88-250-1000-8.
- Raciti-Romeo, Vincenzo (1897). Acireale e dintorni. Guida storico- monumentale. (in Italian). Acireale: Saro Donzuso 1897.
- "Per la storia del Seminario di Acireale." In Memorie e rendiconti dell'Accademia di Scienze Lettere e Belle Arti degli Zelanti e dei Dafnici di Acireale, Serie III, vol. I, pp. 359-431.

=== External links ===
- David M. Cheney, "Diocese of Acireale". Catholic-Hierarchy.org. David M. Cheney.
- Diocesan page (in Italian)
