= Giuseppina Suriano =

Italian Beatified nun

Blessed Giuseppina Suriano

Virgin
- Born: 18 February 1915; Partinico, Palermo, Kingdom of Italy
- Died: 19 May 1950 (aged 35); Partinico, Palermo
- Venerated in: Roman Catholic Church
- Beatified: 5 September 2004, Loreto, Italy by Pope John Paul II
- Feast: 19 May

Giuseppina Suriano (18 February 1915 - 19 May 1950) was an Italian Roman Catholic member of the Catholic Action movement. Suriano was born to simple farmers near Palermo and became a noticeable and integral figure in Catholic Action during her life while also working alongside the Young Catholic Action movement for a brief period of time.

Suriano was beatified in Loreto on 5 September 2004 on the occasion of the visit of Pope John Paul II there.

== Life ==
Giuseppina Suriano was born near Palermo in 1915 to Giuseppe Suriano and Graziella Costantino. Her baptism was celebrated on 6 March 1915 in the local parish church of SS. Maria Annunziata. Suriano was often called "Pina" as a shortened version of her birthname. Her religious education came from her parents and her grandparents and in 1919 she began to attend a kindergarten that the Collegiate Sisters of San Antonio managed. In 1921 she began to attend a public school in Partinico and her teachers there admired her for her virtues and she left in 1927. One of her teachers was Margherita Drago. In 1922 she received her First Communion and the Confirmation.

In 1922 Giuseppina she became a member of Catholic Action. Her local parish priest, Antonio Cataldo, became her spiritual director and confessor around this time. Giuseppina served from 1939 until 1948 as the secretary to the movement while from 1945 to 1948 serving as the president of the Youth Catholic Action movement. In 1948 she established the Association of the Daughters of Mary and served as its president until her death.

Suriano desired to become a nun but this dream never materialized, for her mother was opposed to her religious activism for she wanted her daughter to wed and settle down. On 29 April 1932 with her spiritual director's permission, she made a private vow to remain chaste and renewed this vow each month. She also rejected all marriage proposals that men put forth to her. In February 1940 her parents relented to her desire and allowed her to enter the religious life. Guiseppina entered at the Daughters of Saint Anne in Palermo; she was forced to leave eight days later because a medical examination revealed she had a heart problem. In September 1948 she went on a pilgrimage to Rome for a Catholic Action event.

On 30 March 1948 she and three other women offered themselves as victims for the sanctification of priests and made it into the hands of the priest Andrea Soresi. In March the first signs of a violent form of rheumatic arthritis surfaced. Suriano suffered a sudden massive heart attack as she prepared to go to Mass and died as a result of this. Her remains were later transferred from their previous resting place on 18 May 1969. Suriano had desired to attend the canonization of Maria Goretti on 24 June 1950 but had died before this. Soresi would become her first biographer.

== Beatification ==
The beatification process opened in Monreale in an informative process that Archbishop Corrado Mingo inaugurated on 6 March 1968 and later closed on 26 June 1975. Theologians issued a decree on 14 May 1980 that saw the approval of all of her spiritual writings while she was proclaimed a Servant of God on 11 May 1982 after the Congregation for the Causes of Saints issued the official "nihil obstat" to the cause - the formal introduction of the cause. Archbishop Salvatore Cassisa later opened a cognitional process that he closed on 8 March 1985 before the Congregation for the Causes of Saints validated these two processes in Rome on 6 November 1987.

The postulation submitted the Positio in 1988 which allowed for theologians to approve it on 20 September while the Congregation for the Causes of Saints followed suit on 6 December before passing it onto the pope for his approval. Pope John Paul II confirmed her heroic virtue on 18 February 1989 and named her as Venerable. The pope later approved a miracle attributed to her intercession on 22 June 2004 and this allowed for him to preside over her beatification in Loreto on 5 September 2004. The miracle in question was the healing of Isabella Mannonne (b. 19 December 1973) who suffered serious injuries in a near-fatal accident on 14 June 1992. The current postulator for this cause is Fra Giovangiuseppe Califano.
