= Trapani Cathedral =

Cathedral in Trapani, Sicily, Italy

Coordinates: 38.0161°N 12.5081°E

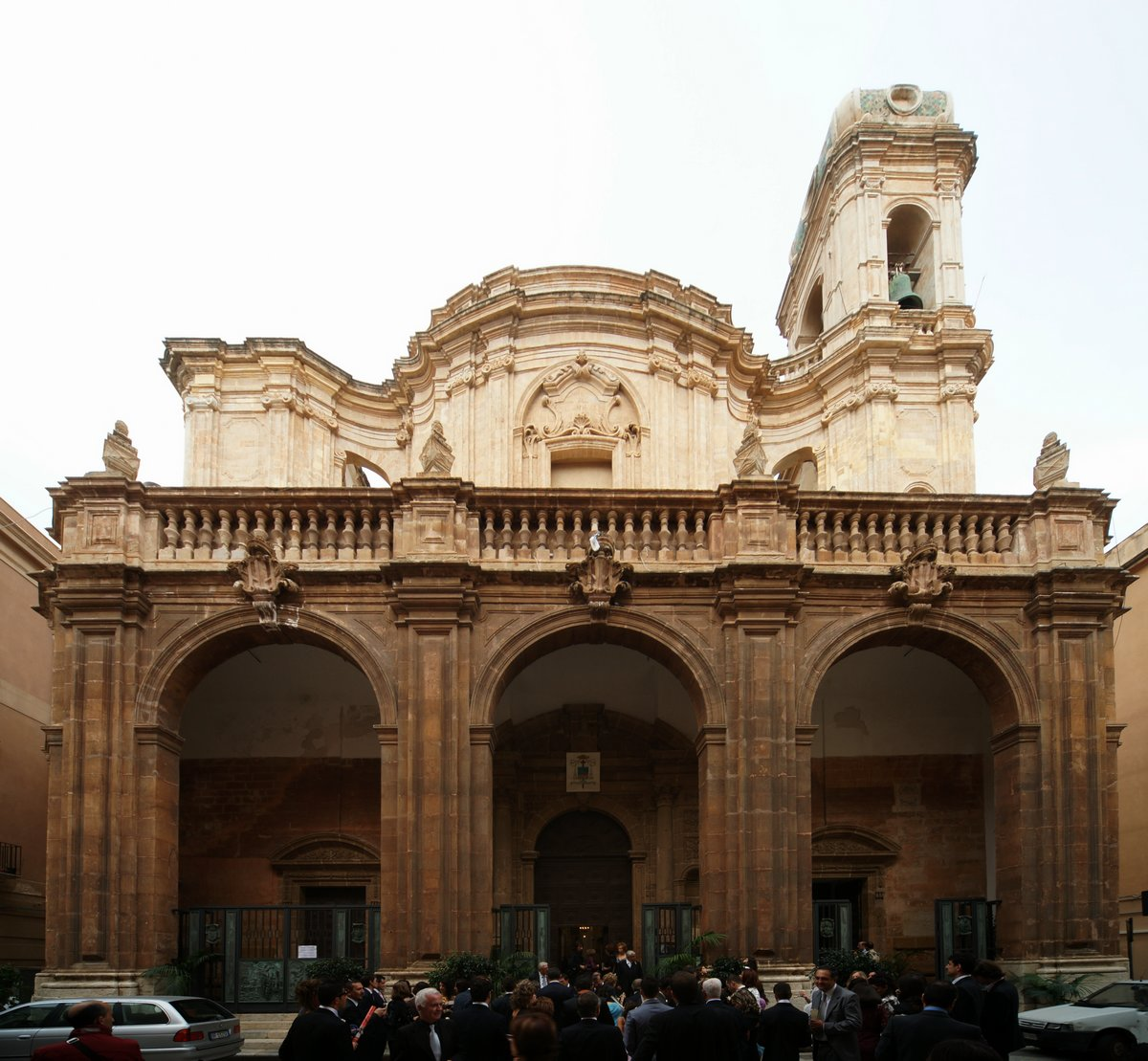
The façade of cathedral on Corso Vittorio Emanuele II

Dome of the Trapani Cathedral

Trapani Cathedral, otherwise the Basilica of St. Lawrence the Martyr (Italian: Duomo di Trapani; Basilica cattedrale di San Lorenzo martire) is the cathedral of the Roman Catholic Diocese of Trapani, dedicated to Saint Lawrence. It is located in Trapani, Sicily, Italy.

The church was built by order of Alfonso the Magnanimous in 1421 and was elevated to a parish in the second half of the fifteenth century. In 1844, when the Diocese of Trapani was created, the church was made its episcopal seat.

Over the following centuries, the building was modified several times and its current appearance dates from the restoration of the eighteenth century by the architect Giovanni Biagio Amico.

== Specus Corallii ==
Oratory attached to the cathedral, the so-called Sala Laurentina, located on Via Generale Domenico Giglio, 10–12. The work was designed in 2015 by the architect Antonino Cardillo, commissioned by Mgr. Gaspare Gruppuso and the Concilio Pastorale, and built in 2016 with private donation funds previously collected by Mgr. Antonino Adragna.
