= Diocese of Trapani =

Roman Catholic diocese in Italy

Coordinates: 38.0167°N 12.5167°E

Diocese of Trapani Dioecesis Drepanensis Diocesi di Trapani

Catholic
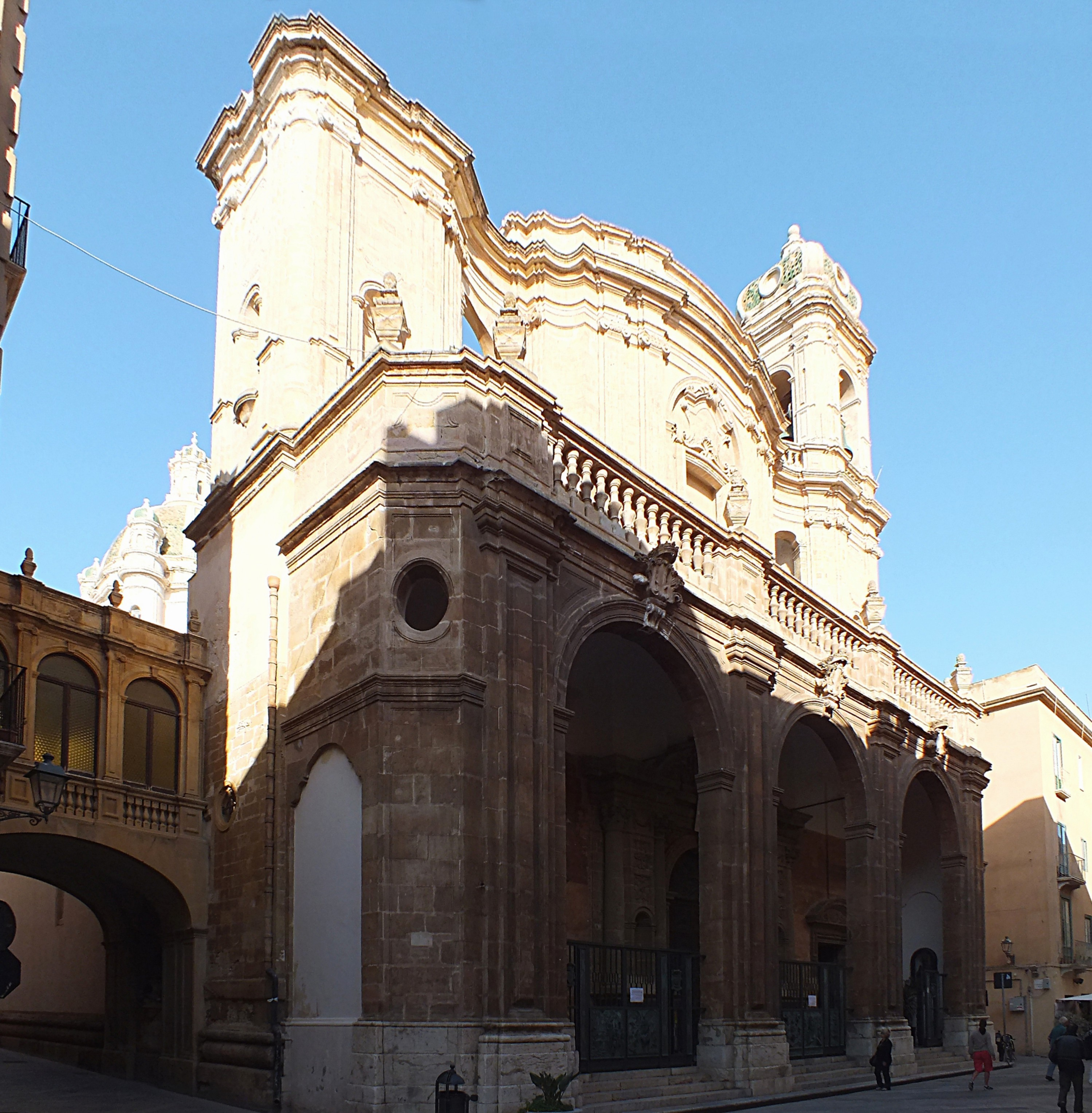
- Cathedral Basilica of St. Lawrence the Martyr in Trapani

Location
- Country: Italy
- Territory: Trapani, Erice, Paceco, Valderice, San Vito Lo Capo, Custonaci, Alcamo, Castellammare del Golfo, Buseto Palizzolo, Calatafimi-Segesta, Favignana
- Ecclesiastical province: Palermo

Statistics
- Area: 1,089 km^{2} (420 sq mi)
- Population: Total; Catholics: (as of 2023); 197,439 ▼; 194,327 ▼ (98.4%)
- Parishes: 94

Information
- Rite: Latin Rite
- Established: May 31, 1844
- Cathedral: Cathedral Basilica of St. Lawrence the Martyr in Trapani
- Patron saint: Our Lady of Trapani
- Secular priests: 70 (diocesan) ▼22 (religious Orders) ▼19 Permanent Deacons

Current leadership
- Pope: Leo XIV
- Bishop: Pietro Maria Fragnelli
- Metropolitan Archbishop: Paolo Romeo
- Bishops emeritus: Francesco Miccichè

Map
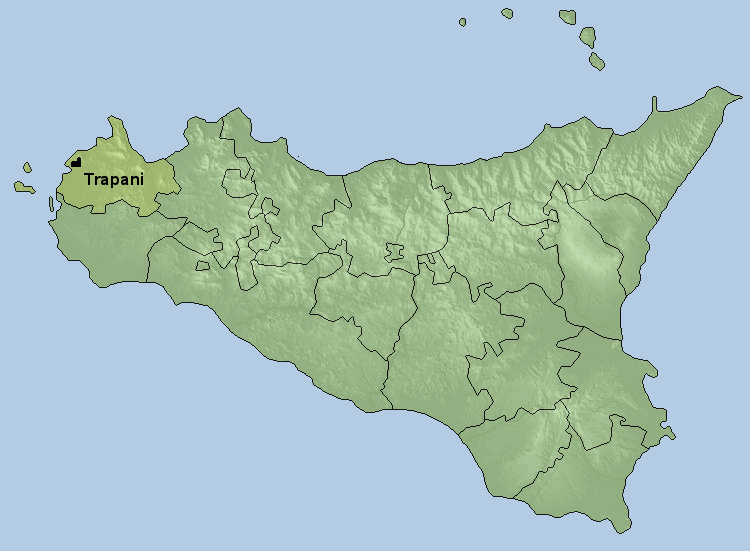

Website
- www.diocesi.trapani.it

The Diocese of Trapani (Latin: Dioecesis Drepanensis) is a Latin diocese of the Catholic Church in the westernmost part of Sicily, approximately 73 miles or 117 kilometers west of Palermo. It is a suffragan of the archdiocese of Palermo.

== History ==
On 10 January 1072, following negotiations and the surrender of the Muslims of Palermo, the brothers Robert Guiscard and Roger de Hauteville entered the city of Palermo in triumph. They immediately ordered the cathedral of the Greek Christian community to be reconsecrated, and attended a Mass of thanksgiving. In 1077, the city of Trapani fell to the Normans.

Mazara was captured in 1092, and, with the permission of Pope Urban II, a new diocese was established at the seaport of Mazara (Mazzara) in 1093. The territory of Trapani was included in the territory of the diocese of Mazara del Vallo.

Efforts to erect a separate diocese at Trapani can be traced as far back as 1496, but they failed due to the vigorous opposition of the bishops of Mazara.

The Jesuit college and church, the work of the architect Natale Masuccio, begun before 1614, were completed in 1636.

=== Reestablishment of order ===
Following the expulsion of the Bonapartists and the restoration of the Papal States, a concordat was signed between the Papacy and the Kingdom of the Two Sicilies on 16 February 1818, and ratified by Pius VII on 25 February 1818. King Ferdinand I issued the concordat as a law on 21 March 1818. The re-erection of the dioceses of the kingdom and the ecclesiastical provinces took more than three years. The right of the king to nominate the candidate for a vacant bishopric was recognized, as in the Concordat of 1741, subject to papal confirmation (preconisation). The possibility of the creation of new dioceses was specifically recognized.

Since the Napoleonic period, Trapani had changed. It became an important seaport for western Sicily, it had been named the capital of a civil district, and its population had risen to more than 23,000 people.

==== Creation of the diocese ====
In 1844, with the consent and at the urging of King Ferdinand II of the Two Sicilies, but not without opposition, the diocese of Trepani was created. On 8 June 1844, Pope Gregory XVI signed the bull "Ut Animarum Pastores." To form the territory of the new diocese, the pope removed six towns and their territories from the diocese of Mazara: Trapani, Monte San Giuliano, Paceco, Città Favignana, Isola, and Pantelleria Isola, with a total population of around 180,000 persons.

The Collegiate church of San Lorenzo in Trapani, which was also a parish church, was promoted to the dignity of a cathedral, and the seat of the bishop of Trapani was fixed there. A Chapter of canons, eighteen in number, headed by the dignities of Precentor and Dean, was established to carry out the functions of the cathedral. One of the canons was designated the Theologus, another the Penitentiary. There were twenty prebends (benefices), one for each of the members of the Chapter. The pope retained the right to appoint the dignities, but the king was granted the right to nominate the other prebendaries, except the Theologus, Penitentiary, and the canon who served as parish priest of the cathedral parish. The canons were granted the privilege of framing their own statutes, in accordance with canon law, papal decrees, and the decrees of the Council of Trent.

Its first bishop, the Redemptorist Vincenzo M. Marolda, was nominated by King Ferdinand II on 20 May 1844, and approved by Pope Gregory XVI on 22 July 1844.

On 2—24 June 1850, Cardinal Ferdinando Maria Pignatelli, Archbishop of Palermo, held a congregation of the bishops of Sicily in Palermo. Bishop Marolda of Trapani did not attend, but he was represented by the Dean of the cathedral Chapter, Msgr. Francesco Ingardia.

== Bishops of Trapani ==
- Vincenzo Maria Marolda, C.SS.R. (1844–1851 Resigned)
- Vincenzo Ciccolo Rinaldi (1853–1874 Died)
- Giovanni Battista Bongiorni (1874–1879)
- Francesco Ragusa (1879–1895 Died)
- Stefano Gerbino di Cannitello, O.S.B. (1895–1906 Resigned)
- Francesco Maria Raiti, O. Carm. (1906–1932 Died)
- Ferdinando Ricca (1932–1947 Died)
- Filippo Jacolino (1947–1950 Died)
- Corrado Mingo (1950–1961)
- Francesco Ricceri (1961–1978 Retired)
- Emanuele Romano (1978–1988 Retired)
- Domenico Amoroso, S.D.B. (1988–1997 Died)
- Francesco Miccichè (1998 – 19 May 2012 Removed
- Pietro Maria Fragnelli (2013– )

== See also ==
- Roman Catholic Archdiocese of Palermo
- Roman Catholic Diocese of Mazara del Vallo

== Sources ==
- Cappelletti, Giuseppe (1870). Le chiese d'Italia dalla loro origine sino ai nostri giorni (in Italian). Vol. vigesimoprimo (21). Venezia: Antonelli. pp. 556–558.
- Corso, Salvatore (2008). "La diocesi di Trapani". (in Italian). In: Luigi Mezzadri; Maurizio Tagliaferri; Elio Guerriero (edd.), Le diocesi d'Italia (Milan: Edizioni San Paolo 2008), pp. 1294–1297.
- Mondello, Fortunato (1876). Bibliografia trapanese. (in Italian). Palermo: Giornale di Sicilia 1876.
- Ritzler, Remigius; Sefrin, Pirminus (1968). Hierarchia Catholica medii et recentioris aevi (in Latin). Vol. VII (1800–1846. Monasterii: Libr. Regensburgiana.
- Remigius Ritzler; Pirminus Sefrin (1978). Hierarchia catholica Medii et recentioris aevi (in Latin). Vol. VIII (1846–1903). Il Messaggero di S. Antonio.
- Pięta, Zenon (2002). Hierarchia catholica medii et recentioris aevi (in Latin). Vol. IX (1903–1922). Padua: Messagero di San Antonio. ISBN 978-88-250-1000-8.

=== External links ===
- Diocesan website (in Italian)
- Benigni, Umberto (1912). "Trapani, diocese of," in: The Catholic Encyclopedia Volume 15 (New York: Appleton 1912), p. 23.
