= Dan Micciche =

English football coach (born 1979)

Personal information
- Date of birth: 30 November 1979 (age 46)
- Place of birth: England

Managerial career
- Years: Team
- 2015–2017: England U16
- 2018: Milton Keynes Dons
- 2018–2021: Arsenal U15
- 2021–2022: Arsenal U18
- 2022: Crawley Town (assistant)

Dan Micciche (born 30 November 1979) is an English football coach and manager, who most recently served as assistant manager at EFL League Two club Crawley Town. He was manager of the England U16 national team from 2015 to 2017 and Milton Keynes Dons for three months in 2018. He was employed by Arsenal between 2018 and 2022, as head coach of Arsenal U15s and later head coach of Arsenal U18s, before being appointed as Crawley Town's assistant manager in summer 2022.

== Early life and career ==
Micciche was born in England to Italian immigrants, and later attended Loughborough University and the University of Liverpool achieving Master's degrees in both International Management and Football.

After coaching spells with the academies of Crystal Palace and Tottenham Hotspur, Micciche joined Milton Keynes Dons in October 2007 as Assistant Academy Manager, and was later promoted to Head of Academy Coaching. England international Dele Alli credits Micciche as being key in his development as a footballer during his time at the club.

Micciche left the club in August 2013 to join the FA as Coach and Player Development Technical Lead concentrating on the development of England national team players and coaches in the U12 to U16 age group.

== Managerial career ==
=== England U16 ===
In 2015, Micciche was appointed as manager of the England U16 national team. During his tenure as manager, Micciche achieved success with the age group by winning the 2015 Nike International Tournament Cup, with victories over teams including Brazil U17 and tournament hosts USA U17. Several players coached by Micciche in the U16 age group who progressed into the England U17 team went on to win the 2017 FIFA U-17 World Cup.

On 21 December 2017, the FA announced that the association and Micciche had mutually decided to part company.

=== Milton Keynes Dons ===
On 23 January 2018, Micciche returned to Milton Keynes Dons, being appointed as first team manager alongside assistant manager Keith Millen. Following a run of poor results with only three wins in sixteen matches in charge, Micciche left the club on 22 April 2018.

=== Arsenal ===
On 30 November 2018, Micciche was announced as head coach of the Arsenal U15 team. He became head coach of the club's under-18 side in summer 2021.

=== Crawley Town ===
On 6 June 2022, Arsenal under-23 manager Kevin Betsy was appointed as EFL League Two club Crawley Town's manager, with Micciche appointed as his assistant. However, Micciche left the club along with Betsy on 9 October following a poor start to the season.

== Personal life ==
Micciche grew up watching Italian football, and was a fan of Juventus.

== Managerial statistics ==
As of match played on 21 April 2018

| Team | From | To | Record | | | | | Ref |
| Team | From | To | P | W | D | L | Win % | Ref |
|---|---|---|---|---|---|---|---|---|
| Milton Keynes Dons | 23 January 2018 | 22 April 2018 | 16 | 3 | 3 | 10 | 18.75 | |
| Total | | | 16 | 3 | 3 | 10 | 18.75 | — |
