= Francesco Miccichè (bishop) =

Italian Roman Catholic prelate (born 1943)

- Bishop Emeritus of Trapani
- Church: Catholic Church
- Diocese: Diocese of Trapani
- In office: 24 January 1998 – 19 May 2012
- Predecessor: Domenico Amoroso
- Successor: Pietro Maria Fragnelli
- Previous posts: Titular Bishop of Chusira (1988-1998); Auxiliary Bishop of Messina-Lipari-Santa Lucia del Mela (1988-1998)

Orders
- Ordination: 28 June 1967
- Consecration: 24 January 1989 by Salvatore Pappalardo

Personal details
- Born: 16 June 1943 (age 83) San Giuseppe Jato, Province of Palermo, Kingdom of Italy

Francesco Miccichè (born 16 June 1943) is an Italian Roman Catholic prelate who served as Bishop of Trapani from 1998 to 2012.

== Biography ==
Miccichè was born into a family of modest means on 16 June 1943 in San Giuseppe Iato, a village outside of Palermo.

He was ordained a Catholic priest of the Archdiocese of Monreale on 28 June 1967. Pope John Paul II appointed him titular bishop of Cusira and Auxiliary Bishop of Messina-Lipari-Santa Lucia del Mela on 23 December 1988 and he received his episcopal consecration from Cardinal Salvatore Pappalardo in the Cathedral of Monreale on 24 January 1989. John Paul named him Bishop of Trapani on 24 January 1998.

When Miccichè faced charges of financial mismanagement and embezzlement in 2011, the Vatican ordered an investigation conducted by Bishop Domenico Mogavero between June and December of that year. Pope Benedict XVI removed him on 19 May 2012 and appointed Archbishop Alessandro Plotti of Pisa as Apostolic Administrator of Trapani. The formal basis for his removal was "alienation of property" that endangered the diocese, and press reports referenced more than a million US dollars missing from two charitable foundations and the sale of dozens of church properties to friends at prices far below their market value. Miccichè called his removal "an extreme measure" that he did not understand. In a letter to the people of the diocese he wrote: "My superiors were unable or unwilling to understand what was going on in this diocese, leaving the clergy and especially the people of God at the mercy of petty slander." He said he accepted Benedict's action "in a spirit of obedience", but attributed the charges against him to the enemies he made in denouncing the Mafia and Masonry.

He remains a bishop and holds the title Bishop emeritus of Trapani. He celebrated the 25th anniversary of his consecration as bishop in January 2014 with a Mass in the cathedral of Monreale. In April 2015, he denounced Mogavero, accusing him of slander and of violating the secrecy of his investigation.

Plotti confirmed that Miccichè had purchased a large penthouse apartment in the center of Rome using funds meant for charity. He said that when questioned about the source of some of the funds used for the real estate transaction, Miccichè replied: "I found them in a drawer." In December 2015, civil authorities announced that they had seized works of art and jewelry valued at two million Euros from Miccichè's apartment, items they said belonged to churches in the Trapani diocese. On 16 December 2015, the Press Office of the Holy See denied press reports that Miccichè had asked the Vatican to shield him from public prosecution for embezzlement by claiming Vatican citizenship. La Repubblica had reported the previous day that Miccichè had on several occasions requested a Vatican appointment that would remove him from Italian jurisdiction.

The legal proceedings against Miccichè and two other diocesan officials were still under way in June 2018. The Vatican announced that Pope Francis met with him privately on 18 January 2019.
