= Leonard Abel =

Most Reverend Leonard Abel
- Titular Bishop of Sidon
- Church: Catholic Church
- In office: 1582–1605
- Predecessor: Alfonso Merchante de Valeria
- Successor: Alonso Orozco Enriquez de Armendáriz Castellanos y Toledo

Orders
- Consecration: 19 August 1582 by Giulio Antonio Santorio

Personal details
- Died: 2 May 1605

Leonard Abel or Léonardo Abela (died 2 May 1605) was a Roman Catholic prelate who served as Titular Bishop of Sidon (1582–1605). An outstanding linguist, conversant in Hebrew, Chaldean, Syriac and Arabic, Pope Gregory XIII named him titular bishop of Sidon, and appointed him legate to the Eastern Churches. Born in Malta, he died in Rome in 1605.

== Biography ==
Leonardo Abela was born to a noble and wealthy family in Malta. In 1562/64, he had a summer residence built in the village of Tarxien, the Palazzo Abela. From May to September 1565, During the Great Siege of Malta by the Ottomans, the attackers occupied part of the island (including the Palazzo Abela). The Order of the Knights of St. John repelled the invaders.

In 1563, at the age of twenty-two, the young Leonardo became canon of St Paul's Cathedral in Mdina. By 1574, he had completed his law studies and was awarded a doctor in utroque jure. When the Bishop of Malta, Martín Rojas de Portalrubio, died in March 1577, Canon Abela was in charge of the administration of the diocese in the interim until the appointment of the new bishop, Tomás Gargal, on 11 August 1578. On 20 June 1578, Pope Gregory XIII appointed Abela Vicar General of the Diocese.

An outstanding linguist, Abela had learned four Semitic languages: Hebrew, Chaldean, Syriac and Arabic. Towards the end of 1578, he went to Rome where he quickly attracted the favour of Cardinal Giulio Antonio Santorio, protector of the Eastern Churches. Abela served as a translator of the texts between Syriac and Latin.

The idea of an embassy of the Holy See in the East, to renew contact with the separate churches, took shape. On 20 July 1582 Pope Gregory appointed Abela titular bishop of Sidonia, in Asia Minor. On 19 August he received the episcopal consecration from Cardinal Santorio, Cardinal-Priest of San Bartolomeo all'Isola, with Giovanni Battista Santorio, Bishop of Alife, Antonio Poli de Mathaeis, Bishop of Bosnia, and Vincenzo Cutelli, Bishop of Catania, serving as co-consecrators.

On 12 March 1583 Bishop Abela left Rome for Syria by way of Venice, with two Jesuits as his embassy companions. They arrived in Aleppo on 16 July. The Bishop met with the Syriac Orthodox patriarch at the monastery of Mar Abihaï, near Gargar on the Euphrates (ten days' journey from Aleppo); the legates left Aleppo in November, and a nephew of the patriarch came to meet them in Desse. But it was Thomas (brother of the two successive patriarchs Nemet Allah and David) who showed up, invested, he said, with full powers, because the tension was high around these talks. In three days of discussions in the monastery, then in the nearby village of Orbis, it was agreed that there was agreement on the substance, but the Jacobite bishop declared that it was quite impossible for them to recognize the Council of Chalcedon and especially the damnation of Pope Dioscorus I of Alexandria, one of the most important saints in their Church. Nor could they adopt the Gregorian calendar, which would have been interpreted in the region as a pure and simple rallying to the Catholic Church.

Leaving there after this inconclusive negotiation, the legates then moved to Sis, Cilicia, to meet the Armenian Catholicos Katchatour II, who was soon replaced by Azaria I, who dealt actively with the legation (including a little later in Aleppo), but was thwarted by a bishop who was hostile to him, and then had to go to Constantinople to justify himself. The Western ambassadors also went to meet with the two Melkite patriarchs: the one from Antioch, who resided in Damascus, and the one from Jerusalem.

The legates then returned to the port of Tripoli, where the two Jesuits were instructed to return to Rome. Leonardo Abel remained in Syria and sought to renew contact with the brothers Thomas and David who led the Jacobite Church, but he could only obtain an abundant exchange of correspondence, dilatory content. He left Syria on 1 August 1586 to return to Rome, where he arrived in February 1587, and wrote his report for Pope Sixtus V (addressed on 19 April 1587). He had brought back about one hundred and fifty oriental manuscripts that joined the collections of the Vatican Library.

Close to Cardinal Santorio, Leonardo Abela remained closely involved in the Holy See's talks with the Eastern Churches. In 1588, Cardinal Girolamo Rusticucci was appointed Vicar General of the Diocese of Rome, and the Maltese Prelate became under him Vice-Manager of that diocese. In 1593, he joined a commission charged with examining a multilingual Bible project, with all the major languages of the Christian East. Arbela served as Titular Bishop of Sidon until his death on 2 May 1605.

== Episcopal succession ==
Episcopal succession of Leonard Abel

While bishop, he was the principal consecrator of:

- Juan Orozco Covarrubias y Leiva, Bishop of Agrigento (1594);

and the principal co-consecrator of:

- Pietro Ridolfi (bishop), Bishop of Venosa (1587);
- Bonaventura Bellemo, Bishop of Andros (1587);
- Giovanni Battista Costanzo, Archbishop of Cosenza (1591);
- Scipione Spina, Bishop of Lecce (1591);
- Aurelio Novarini, Archbishop of Dubrovnik (1591);
- Ascanio Libertano, Bishop of Cagli (1591);
- Napoleone Comitoli, Bishop of Perugia (1591);
- Claudio de Curtis, Bishop of Crotone (1592);
- Giulio Cesare Riccardi, Archbishop of Bari (1592);
- Nicolò Stizzia, Bishop of Cefalù (1594);
- Georgius Perpignani, Bishop of Tinos (1594);
- Placido della Marra, Bishop of Melfi e Rapolla (1595);
- Giulio Doffius, Bishop of Alessano (1595);
- Ascanio Giacobazio, Bishop of Anglona-Tursi (1595);
- Antonio d'Aquino, Bishop of Sarno (1595);
- Juan López, Bishop of Crotone (1595);
- Francisco Velarde de la Cuenca, Archbishop of Messina (1599);
- Ascanio Parisi, Bishop of Marsico Nuovo (1599);
- Fabio Tempestivi, Archbishop of Dubrovnik (1602);
- Fabrizio Campani, Bishop of Ferentino (1603);
- Azarias Friton, Archbishop of Nachitschewan (1604);
- Taddeo Sarti, Bishop of Nepi e Sutri (1604);
- Giuseppe Saladino, Bishop of Siracusa (1604); and
- Maffeo Barberini, Titular Archbishop of Nazareth (1604).

He also ordained Alessandro di Sangro, (later the Patriarch of Alexandria) (1604) to the priesthood.

== External links and additional sources ==
- Cheney, David M. "Sidon (Titular See)". Catholic-Hierarchy.org. (for Chronology of Bishops) ^{[self-published]}
- Chow, Gabriel. "Titular Episcopal See of Sidon (Lebanon)". GCatholic.org. (for Chronology of Bishops) ^{[self-published]}

Catholic Church titles
Preceded by Alfonso Merchante de Valeria	Titular Bishop of Sidon; 1582–1605	Succeeded by Alonso Orozco Enriquez de Armendáriz Castellanos y Toledo
