= Saint Libertine =

Bishop and Martyr
- Died: 1st or 3rd century AD
- Feast: 3 November

Saint Libertine (or Libertinus) (Italian: San Libertino) is venerated as a Christian martyr and as the first bishop of Agrigento, in Sicily.

According to tradition, Libertine was sent by Saint Peter to Agrigento to Christianize the city during the 1st century. However, Libertine may have actually lived at a later date, during the 3rd century, and may have been martyred during the persecutions of Decius or Diocletian.

The tradition also holds that his preaching was so effective that he was eventually martyred by the Roman authorities.

He performed miracles and built a church, perhaps on the site of the current Cathedral of Agrigento. A legend told of Libertine is that just before he died, he uttered the Latin verse: Gens iniqua, plebs rea, non videbis ossa mea ("Iniquitous people, guilty people, you will not see my bones"). The northern gate of the city, Bibbirria, is said to have been derived from a corruption of Libertine's last words. However, it is more likely that the name derives from the Arabic for "Gate of the winds" (Bab er rijah). Furthermore, according to Giuseppe Fumagalli, these verses were a common saying in communities that did not possess the relics of their patron saint.

Libertine was martyred with Saint Peregrinus (San Pellegrino), and is said to have either been stoned to death or killed with a sword.

== Veneration ==
A cult dedicated to Libertine existed from a very early date in Agrigento. In Leontius' life of Saint Gregory of Agrigento, a bishop of the city, it is stated that the church of Agrigento owned a house in Palermo that was named after Libertine. Libertine was invoked for aid in 1625 during a plague that afflicted Agrigento.
