= Marullo =

Marullo is a surname of Italian origin. Notable people with the surname include:

- Cesare Marullo (died 1588), Italian Roman Catholic prelate, Archbishop of Palermo and Agrigento
- Giuseppe Marullo (died 1685), Italian painter of the Baroque period
- Louis Marullo (born 1954), American heavy metal singer, see Eric Adams (musician)
- Michael Tarchaniota Marullus (c. 1458–1500), Renaissance humanist scholar, poet, and soldier of Greek origin raised in Italy
- Noah Marullo (born 1999), British child actor
