= Antonio Lombardo =

Antonio Lombardo may refer to:

- Antonio Lombardo (bishop), Roman Catholic prelate, Archbishop of Messina, Bishop of Agrigento and Bishop of Mazara del Vallo
- Antonio Lombardo (gangster), Italian-born American mobster
- Antonio Lombardo (sculptor), Italian Renaissance sculptor.
