= Juan Beltrán de Guevara =

Catholic bishop

Most Reverend Juan Beltrán de Guevara
- Titular Archbishop of Nicaea
- Church: Catholic Church
- Predecessor: Melchior Miguel Carneiro Leitão
- Successor: Vincentius Quatrimanus
- Previous post: Bishop of Mazara del Vallo (1571–1573)

Juan Beltrán de Guevara was a Roman Catholic prelate who served as Titular Archbishop of Nicaea (1573) and Bishop of Mazara del Vallo (1571–1573).

== Biography ==
On 24 September 1571, Juan Beltrán de Guevara was appointed during the papacy of Pope Pius V as Bishop of Mazara del Vallo. On 16 January 1573, he resigned as Bishop of Mazara del Vallo and was appointed Titular Archbishop of Nicaea.

While bishop, he served as the principal co-consecrator of Gaspar de Quiroga y Vela, Bishop of Cuenca (1572).

== See also ==
- Catholic Church in Italy

== External links and additional sources ==
- Cheney, David M. "Diocese of Mazara del Vallo". Catholic-Hierarchy.org. (for Chronology of Bishops) ^{[self-published]}
- Chow, Gabriel. "Diocese of Mazara del Vallo (Italy)". GCatholic.org. (for Chronology of Bishops) ^{[self-published]}

Catholic Church titles
| Preceded by Giacomo Lomellino del Canto | Bishop of Mazara del Vallo; 1571–1573 | Succeeded by Antonio Lombardo (bishop) |
| Preceded by Melchior Miguel Carneiro Leitão | Titular Archbishop of Nicaea; 1573–? | Succeeded by Vincentius Quatrimanus |
