= Luigi Bommarito =

Italian Roman Catholic archbishop (1926–2019)

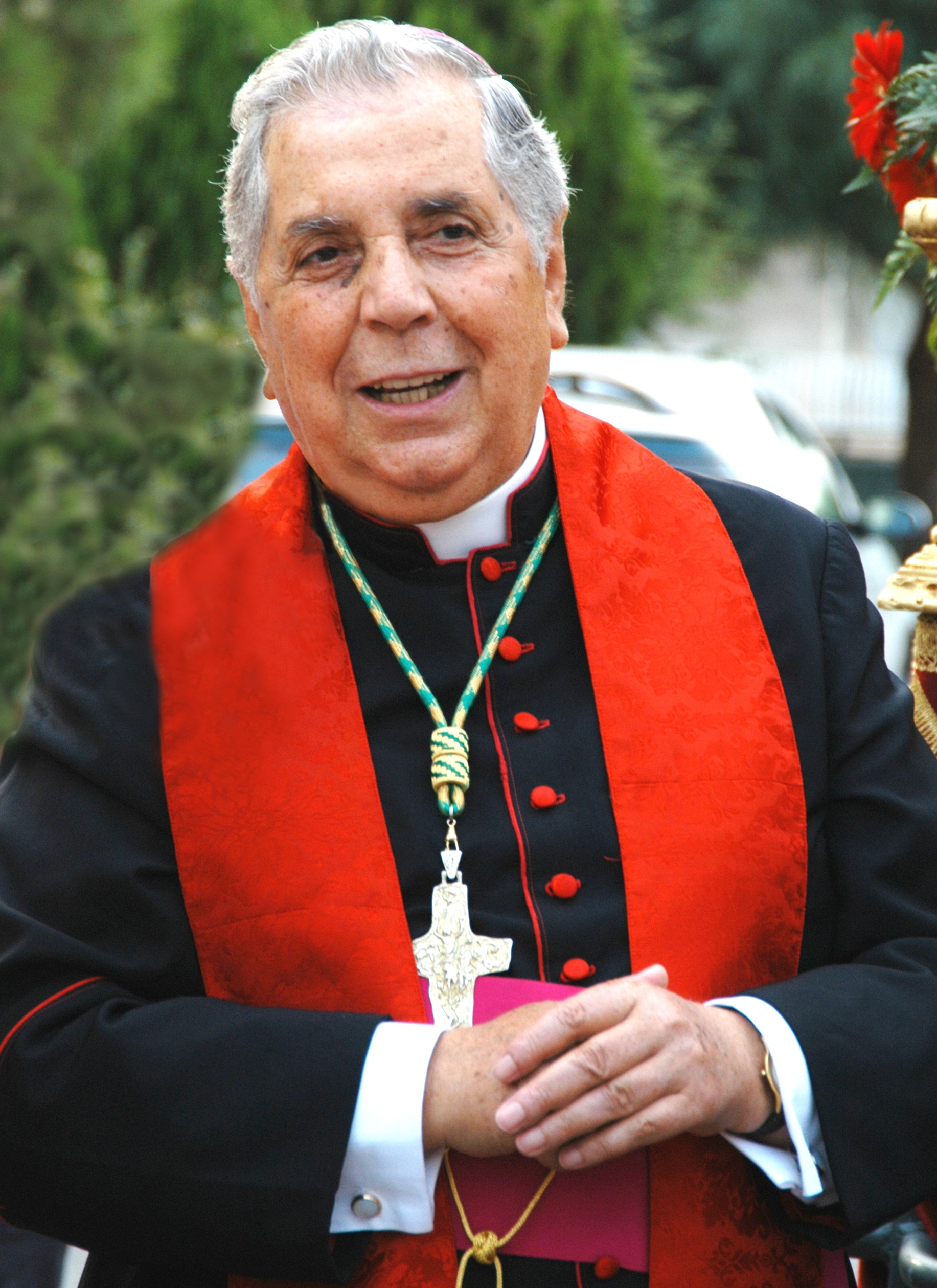
- Mons. Bommarito at Catenanuova in 2005

Personal details
- Born: 1 June 1926 Terrasini, Sicily
- Died: 19 September 2019 (aged 93) Terrasini, Sicily
- Coat of arms

Luigi Bommarito (1 June 1926 – 19 September 2019) was an Italian Roman Catholic archbishop.

Bommarito was born in Terrasini in Sicily, Italy and was ordained to the priesthood in 1949. He served as titular bishop of Vannida and was auxiliary bishop of the Roman Catholic Diocese of Agrigento, Italy, from 1976 to 1980. He then served as bishop of the Agrigento Diocese from 1980 to 1988. Bommarito served as archbishop of the Roman Catholic Archdiocese of Catania, Italy, from 1988 to 2002.
