= Juan Battista de Ojeda =

Most Reverend Antonio Ponticorona
- Archbishop (personal title) of Agrigento
- Church: Catholic Church
- Diocese: Diocese of Agrigento
- In office: 1571–1574
- Predecessor: Luigi Suppa
- Successor: Cesare Marullo
- Previous post: Archbishop of Trani (1560–1571)

Personal details
- Died: 1574 Agrigento, Italy

Juan Battista de Ojeda (died 1574) also Giovanni Battista de Hogeda or Giovanni Battista de Oxeda was a Roman Catholic prelate who served as Archbishop (personal title) of Agrigento (1571–1574) and Archbishop of Trani (1560–1571).

== Biography ==
Juan Battista de Ojeda was born in Spain. On 26 January 1560, he was appointed by Pope Pius IV as Archbishop of Trani. On 27 August 1571, he was appointed by Pope Pius V as Archbishop (personal title) of Agrigento. He served as Bishop of Agrigento until his death in 1574.

== External links and additional sources ==
- Cheney, David M. "Archdiocese of Trani-Barletta-Bisceglie (-Nazareth)". Catholic-Hierarchy.org. (for Chronology of Bishops) ^{[self-published]}
- Chow, Gabriel. "Archdiocese of Trani-Barletta-Bisceglie (Italy)". GCatholic.org. (for Chronology of Bishops) ^{[self-published]}
- Cheney, David M. "Archdiocese of Agrigento". Catholic-Hierarchy.org. (for Chronology of Bishops)^{[self-published]}
- Chow, Gabriel. "Metropolitan Archdiocese of Agrigento (Italy)". GCatholic.org. (for Chronology of Bishops) ^{[self-published]}

Catholic Church titles
Preceded by Giovanni Bernardino Scotti	Archbishop of Trani; 1560–1571	Succeeded by Angelo Oraboni
Preceded by Luigi Suppa	Archbishop (personal title) of Agrigento; 1571–1574	Succeeded by Cesare Marullo
