= Alfonso Merchante de Valeria =

Roman Catholic Bishop

Most Reverend Alfonso Merchante de Valeria
- Auxiliary Bishop of Burgos; Titular Bishop of Sidon
- Church: Catholic Church
- In office: 1582–1605
- Predecessor: Georg Neumann (bishop)
- Successor: Leonard Abel

Orders
- Consecration: 1563 by Francisco Mendoza Bobadilla

Personal details
- Born: 1513
- Died: 1581 (age 68) Burgos, Spain

Alfonso Merchante de Valeria (1513–1581) was a Roman Catholic prelate who served as Auxiliary Bishop of Burgos (1563–1581) and Titular Bishop of Sidon (1563–1581).

== Biography ==
On 15 October 1563, Alfonso Merchante de Valeria was appointed during the papacy of Pope Pius IV as Auxiliary Bishop of Burgos and Titular Bishop of Sidon. In 1563, he was consecrated bishop by Francisco Mendoza Bobadilla, Bishop of Burgos. He served as Auxiliary Bishop of Burgos until his death in 1581. While bishop, he was the principal co-consecrator of Sebastián Lartaún, Bishop of Cuzco (1571); Antonio Manrique Valencia, Bishop of Pamplona (1575); Gaspar Juan de la Figuera, Bishop of Jaca (1578); Miguel Rubio, Bishop of Ampurias e Civita (1579); and Miguel Espinosa, Auxiliary Bishop of Valencia (1580)

== External links and additional sources ==
- Cheney, David M. "Sidon (Titular See)". Catholic-Hierarchy.org. (for Chronology of Bishops) ^{[self-published]}
- Chow, Gabriel. "Titular Episcopal See of Sidon (Lebanon)". GCatholic.org. (for Chronology of Bishops) ^{[self-published]}

Catholic Church titles
Preceded by Georg Neumann (bishop)	Titular Bishop of Sidon; 1563–1581	Succeeded by Leonard Abel
