= Francisco Velarde de la Cuenca =

Italian Roman Catholic prelate (died 1605)

Most Reverend Francisco Velarde de la Cuenca
- Archbishop of Messina
- Church: Catholic Church
- Archdiocese: Archdiocese of Messina
- In office: 1599–1605
- Predecessor: Antonio Lombardo (bishop)
- Successor: Bonaventura Secusio

Orders
- Consecration: 14 February 1599 by Ottaviano Paravicini

Personal details
- Died: 1605 Messina, Italy

Francisco Velarde de la Cuenca was a Roman Catholic prelate who served as Archbishop of Messina (1599–1605).

== Biography ==
Francisco Velarde de la Cuenca was ordained a priest on 20 December 1578. On 1 February 1599, he was appointed during the papacy of Pope Clement VIII as Archbishop of Messina. Two weeks later, he was consecrated bishop by Ottaviano Paravicini, Cardinal-Priest of Sant'Alessio, with Leonard Abel, Titular Bishop of Sidon, and Giovanni Camerota, Bishop of Bova, serving as co-consecrators. He served as Archbishop of Messina until he died in 1605.

== External links and additional sources ==
- Cheney, David M. "Archdiocese of Messina-Lipari-Santa Lucia del Mela". Catholic-Hierarchy.org. (for Chronology of Bishops) ^{[self-published]}
- Chow, Gabriel. "Archdiocese of Messina-Lipari-Santa Lucia del Mela (Italy)". GCatholic.org. (for Chronology of Bishops) ^{[self-published]}

Catholic Church titles
Preceded by Antonio Lombardo (bishop)	Archbishop of Messina; 1599–1605	Succeeded by Bonaventura Secusio
