= Juan Rojas (bishop) =

Roman Catholic prelate (??–1578)

Most Reverend Juan Rojas
- Bishop of Agrigento
- Church: Catholic Church
- Diocese: Diocese of Agrigento
- In office: 1577–1578
- Predecessor: Cesare Marullo
- Successor: Antonio Lombardo

Personal details
- Died: 21 May 1578 Agrigento, Italy

Juan Rojas (died 21 May 1578) was a Roman Catholic prelate who served as Bishop of Agrigento (1577–1578).

== Biography ==
On 9 October 1577, Juan Rojas was appointed by Pope Gregory XIII as Bishop of Agrigento. He served as Bishop of Agrigento until his death on 21 May 1578.

== External links and additional sources ==
- Cheney, David M. "Archdiocese of Agrigento". Catholic-Hierarchy.org. (for Chronology of Bishops)^{[self-published]}
- Chow, Gabriel. "Metropolitan Archdiocese of Agrigento (Italy)". GCatholic.org. (for Chronology of Bishops) ^{[self-published]}

Catholic Church titles
Preceded by Cesare Marullo	Bishop of Agrigento; 1577–1578	Succeeded by Antonio Lombardo
