= Juan Orozco Covarrubias y Leiva =

Spanish Roman Catholic bishop

Most Reverend Juan Orozco Covarrubias y Leiva
- Bishop of Guadix
- Church: Catholic Church
- Diocese: Diocese of Guadix
- In office: 1606–1610
- Predecessor: Juan Fonseca
- Successor: Juan Nicolás Valdés de Carriazo
- Previous post: Bishop of Agrigento (1594–1606)

Orders
- Ordination: 12 May 1573
- Consecration: 8 December 1594 by Leonard Abel

Personal details
- Born: 1544 Toledo, Spain
- Died: 23 June 1610 (age 66) Guadix, Spain

Juan Orozco Covarrubias y Leiva (1544 – 23 June 1610) was a Roman Catholic prelate who served as Bishop of Guadix (1606–1610) and Bishop of Agrigento (1594–1606).

== Biography ==
Juan Orozco Covarrubias y Leiva was born in Toledo, Spain in 1544 and ordained a priest on 12 May 1573. On 2 December 1594, he was appointed during the papacy of Pope Clement VIII as Bishop of Agrigento. On 8 December 1594, he was consecrated bishop by Leonard Abel, Titular Bishop of Sidon, with Cristóbal Senmanat y Robuster, Bishop Emeritus of Orihuela, and Georgius Perpignani, Bishop of Tinos, serving as co-consecrators. On 16 January 1606, he was appointed during the papacy of Pope Paul V as Bishop of Guadix. He served as Bishop of Guadix until his death on 23 June 1610.

== External links and additional sources ==
- Cheney, David M. "Diocese of Guadix". Catholic-Hierarchy.org. (for Chronology of Bishops) ^{[self-published]}
- Chow, Gabriel. "Diocese of Guadix (Spain)". GCatholic.org. (for Chronology of Bishops) ^{[self-published]}
- Cheney, David M. "Archdiocese of Agrigento". Catholic-Hierarchy.org. (for Chronology of Bishops)^{[self-published]}
- Chow, Gabriel. "Metropolitan Archdiocese of Agrigento (Italy)". GCatholic.org. (for Chronology of Bishops) ^{[self-published]}

Catholic Church titles
Preceded by Francesco del Pozzo	Bishop of Agrigento; 1594–1606	Succeeded by Vincenzo Bonincontro
Preceded by Juan Fonseca	Bishop of Guadix; 1606–1610	Succeeded by Juan Nicolás Valdés de Carriazo
