= Luigi Suppa =

Most Reverend Luigi Suppa
- Bishop of Agrigento
- Church: Catholic Church
- Diocese: Diocese of Agrigento
- In office: 1565–1569
- Predecessor: Rodolfo Pio
- Successor: Juan Battista de Ojeda

Personal details
- Died: 29 September 1569 Agrigento, Italy

Luigi Suppa (died 29 September 1569) was a Roman Catholic prelate who served as Bishop of Agrigento (1565–1569).

== Biography ==
Luigi Suppa was ordained a priest in the Order of Preachers. On 13 April 1565, he was appointed by Pope Pius IV as Bishop of Agrigento. He served as Bishop of Agrigento until his death on 29 September 1569.

== External links and additional sources ==
- Cheney, David M. "Archdiocese of Agrigento". Catholic-Hierarchy.org. (for Chronology of Bishops)^{[self-published]}
- Chow, Gabriel. "Metropolitan Archdiocese of Agrigento (Italy)". GCatholic.org. (for Chronology of Bishops) ^{[self-published]}

Catholic Church titles
Preceded by Rodolfo Pio	Bishop of Agrigento; 1565–1569	Succeeded by Juan Battista de Ojeda
