= Francesco Giuseppe Crespos de Escobar =

Most Reverend Francisco José Crespos de Escobar
- Bishop of Agrigento
- Church: Catholic Church
- Diocese: Diocese of Agrigento
- In office: 1672–1674
- Predecessor: Ignazio d'Amico
- Successor: Francesco Maria Rini

Personal details
- Born: 1620 Medina del Campo, Spain
- Died: 17 May 1674 (age 54) Agrigento, Italy

Francisco José Crespos de Escobar (1620–1674) was a Roman Catholic prelate who served as Bishop of Agrigento (1672–1674).

== Biography ==
Francisco José Crespos de Escobar was born in Medina del Campo, Spain. On 2 May 1672, he was appointed during the papacy of Pope Clement X as Bishop of Agrigento. He served as Bishop of Agrigento until his death on 17 May 1674.

== External links and additional sources ==
- Cheney, David M. "Archdiocese of Agrigento". Catholic-Hierarchy.org. (for Chronology of Bishops)^{[self-published]}
- Chow, Gabriel. "Metropolitan Archdiocese of Agrigento (Italy)". GCatholic.org. (for Chronology of Bishops) ^{[self-published]}

Catholic Church titles
Preceded by Ignazio d'Amico	Bishop of Agrigento; 1672–1674	Succeeded by Francesco Maria Rini
