= Juan de Castro =

Spanish Roman Catholic bishop and cardinal (1431–1506)

His Eminence Juan de Castro
- Cardinal Bishop of Agrigento
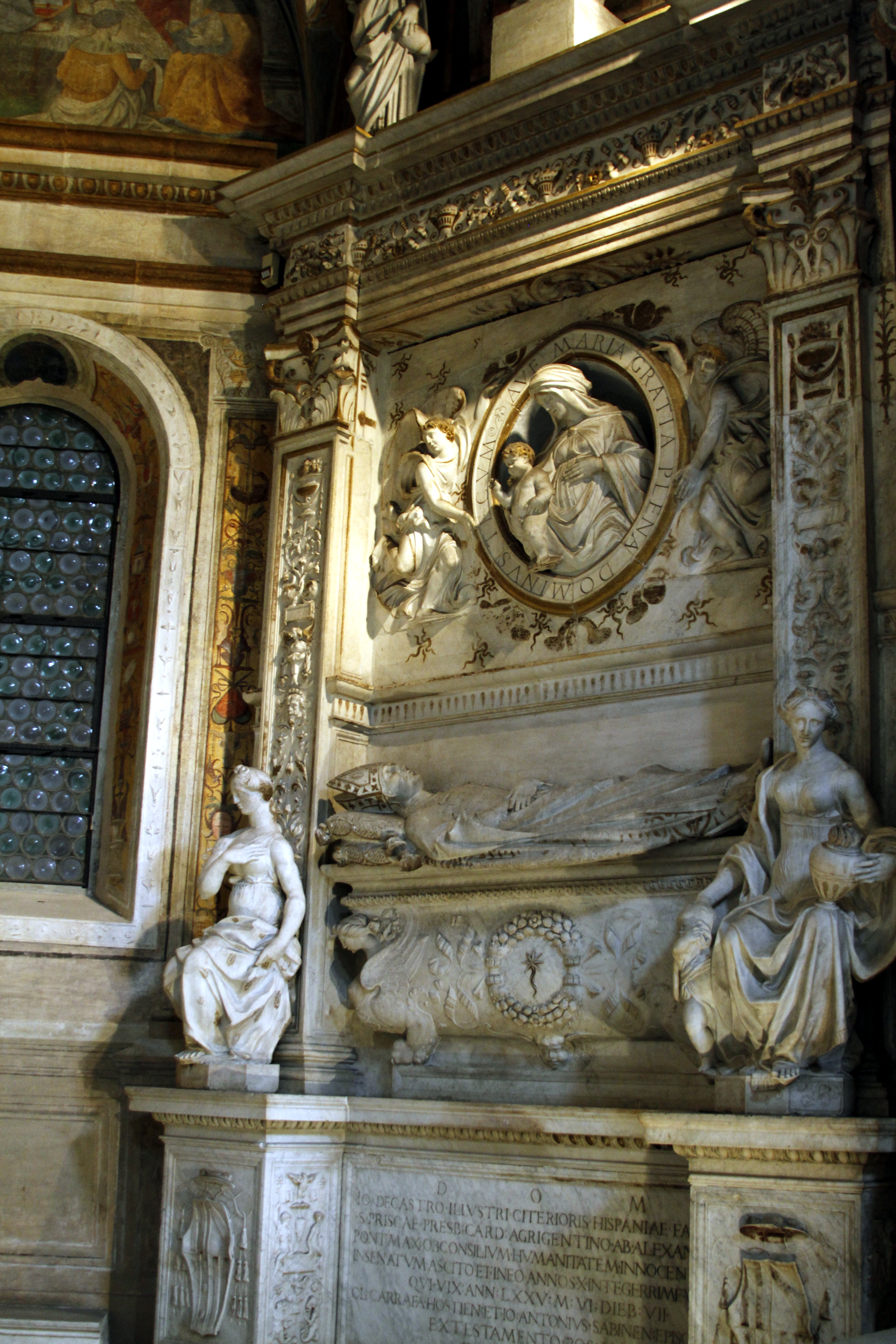
- Tomb of Juan de Castro in Santa Maria del Popolo, Rome
- Church: Roman Catholic
- Diocese: Agrigento
- Appointed: 19 February 1479
- In office: 1479-1506
- Predecessor: Domenico Xarth
- Successor: Giuliano Cibò
- Other post: Cardinal-Priest of Santa Prisca

Orders
- Created cardinal: 19 February 1496 by Alexander VI
- Rank: Cardinal-Priest

Personal details
- Born: March 22, 1431 Valencia, Spain
- Died: September 29, 1506 (aged 75) Rome, Italy
- Buried: Santa Maria del Popolo

Juan de Castro (1431–1506) (called the Cardinal of Agrigento) was a Spanish Roman Catholic bishop and cardinal.

== Biography ==
Juan de Castro was born in Valencia on March 22, 1431, the son of nobles Pedro Galcerán de Castre-Pinòs y Tramaced and Blanca de Só, viscountess of Évol.

He began his ecclesiastical career as a cleric in the see of Elne. He was later the Abbot of Fossanova Abbey. He was a familiar of Cardinal Roderic Llançol i de Borja, who later became Pope Alexander VI.

On February 19, 1479, he was elected Bishop of Agrigento. Pope Sixtus IV confirmed his election on March 20, 1479, and Castro subsequently occupied this see until his death. He attended the papal conclave of 1484 as a custodian. Following the papal conclave of 1492, the new pope, Alexander VI, made Castro prefect of the Castel Sant'Angelo.

Pope Alexander VI made him a cardinal priest in the consistory of February 19, 1496. He received the red hat and the titular church of Santa Prisca on February 24, 1496. From the time of his promotion to the cardinalate, he lived in Rome permanently, participating in the ceremonies, consistories and religious feasts and celebrating masses; he was the executor of the will of Cardinal Bartolomé Martí.

On November 6, 1499, he became the apostolic administrator of the see of Schleswig, occupying this post until July 29, 1502. He became involved in a dispute with two mother superiors at the Monastery of Pedralbes; this led to Ferdinand II of Aragon on March 12, 1500, forbidding Cardinal Castro to interfere in the affairs of the monastery.

He participated in the papal conclave of September 1503 that elected Pope Pius III and in the papal conclave of October 1503 that elected Pope Julius II.

In 1506, he became the Apostolic Administrator of Malta, although Ferdinand II had requested that bishopric for another cardinal who succeeded in the same year.

He died in Rome on September 29, 1506. He is buried in Santa Maria del Popolo.

== External links and additional sources ==
- Cheney, David M. "Archdiocese of Agrigento". Catholic-Hierarchy.org. (for Chronology of Bishops)^{[self-published]}
- Chow, Gabriel. "Metropolitan Archdiocese of Agrigento (Italy)". GCatholic.org. (for Chronology of Bishops) ^{[self-published]}

Catholic Church titles
Preceded by Eggert Dürkop	Administrator of Schleswig; 1499-1502	Succeeded by Detlef Pogwisch
Preceded by Giovanni de Cardellis	Bishop of Agrigento; 1479-1506	Succeeded by Giuliano Cibò
