= Gerland of Agrigento =

Bishop of Agrigento

Saint Gerland of Agrigento (Italian: San Gerlando di Agrigento), also known as Gerland of Besançon (d. 25 February 1100) was a bishop of Agrigento in Sicily. His feast day is 25 February.

== Biography ==
Believed to have been a native of Besançon, he was a relative of the Norman Roger I of Sicily. After the expulsion of the Saracens from Sicily, in 1088 (or 1093) Roger summoned Gerland as the first post-Saracen bishop of Agrigento, to re-establish the church throughout the island. He was canonised in 1159. His relics are in a silver urn in Agrigento Cathedral, which has been dedicated to him since its rebuilding by bishop Bertaldo di Labro in 1305.

Existed several documentary sources concerning Gerland: chronicle of Malaterra, a contemporary historian of the bishop of Agrigento; then the Libellus de successione pontificum Agrigenti, (between 1250 and 1260). Finally, a Gallican breviary, now lost, which contained an office of Saint Gerland that could predate the Libellus. Here is what Malaterra tells in De Rebus Gestis Rogerii comitis et Roberti Guiscardi ducis fratris eius: “(...) To this church he appointed and ordained as bishop Gerland, a man of the Allobroges nation, a person, they say, of great charity and learned in ecclesiastical disciplines."

Gerland was born in Besançon; from a young age, he was enrolled in the clergy at the chapter of Saint Paul. He went on a pilgrimage to Rome to visit the tombs of the apostles, then to the Sanctuary of Saint Michael on Mount Gargano in Apulia, where Crusaders would stop before embarking for the Holy Land. Being related to the Hauteville family, he was summoned to Count Roger's court. Gerland, a scholar of sacred disciplines, was appointed by Roger himself as primicerius scholae cantorum of the Church of the Holy Trinity in Miletus. He was effectively at the head of the ecclesiastical administration, and his role was to instruct the clergy. He is the author of several works on the disciplines of the trivium and the quadrivium, but his principal work is the Computus, in which he studies the dating of the birth of Christ.

After the conquest of Agrigento and the establishment of the episcopal see in Sicily, Count Roger summoned Gerland to the city, where he was elected bishop around 1088. In 1093, Roger defined the boundaries of the Diocese of Agrigento, which covered a vast territory encompassing almost a third of Sicily. This included the modern-day provinces of Agrigento and Caltanissetta, and part of the province of Palermo, stopping about thirty kilometers from the capital. Gerland worked to restore Christianity on the island, carrying out numerous conversions. He fortified the castle of Agrigento and built a cathedral, which he dedicated to the Virgin Mary. He was consecrated in Rome by Pope Urban II, whose bull of confirmation dates from 1098: "Karissime frater Gerlande, quem omnipotens Dominus in ipsa ecclesia nostris tanquam beati Petri manibus consecrare dignatus est."

On his return from Rome, Gerland stopped in many towns in Calabria. He visited, among others, his friend Drogone, the prior at Sainte-Marie-des-Apôtres in Bagnara. During this visit, he informed Drogone of his own imminent death and predicted that Drogone would succeed him in the episcopal see of Agrigento.

Very obscure calculations led Pirri and Rocco to set the date of Gerland's death as February 25, 1104. However, Lynn White Jr. devoted an entire article to redefining the date of the saint's death. According to him, Gerland received the bull from Urban II, who was then in Bari, on October 10, 1098. He was probably consecrated by the pope in Rome around the same time. White argues that unless Gerland spent two whole years at the papal court, which is highly unlikely, he must have stopped in Bagnara on his way back in August or September 1099. Therefore, he must have died in Agrigento on February 25, 1100.

== Veneration ==
Gerland is considered the first Norman saint of Sicily.

His cult grew following the translation of his relics in 1159. Pirri, citing the Gallican breviary, reports that Gerland's body was first buried in the lower part of the cathedral. He adds: "From that place where Gerland's sacred body was located, on March 20, 1159, Indiction 7, his successor Bishop Gentile, having been informed by a most pious priest (who had been warned for the third time by the divine Gerland himself about moving the body), had it transferred with the most solemn ceremony to the upper part of the church, and had it placed in a wooden box in a most honorable place between the two altars of the Most Holy Sacrament and the Most Holy Mother of God."

Gentile, who was the bishop of the diocese of Agrigento from 1154 to 1171, was therefore responsible for the translation and effective canonization of Saint Gerland. The saint's relics were transferred to the cathedral, which was then named after him. His cult does not seem to have spread beyond the Diocese of Agrigento.

The depiction of Saint Gerland at Monreale cathedral's mosaics is likely the oldest surviving image of him. It dates to just a few years after the saint's canonization. A portable altar from the late 12th century, preserved in Agrigento Cathedral, features a series of enamel busts of saints surrounding a central setting of precious stones.

== Sources and external links ==
- Santi e Beati: San Gerlando (in Italian)
- The cult of Saint Gerland at Porto Empedocle (in Italian)
- lavalledeitempli.it: Agrigento Cathedral (in Italian)
