= Diego Haëdo =

Italian Roman Catholic prelate

Most Reverend Cesare Marullo
- Archbishop of Palermo
- Church: Catholic Church
- Diocese: Archdiocese of Palermo
- In office: 1589–1608
- Predecessor: Cesare Marullo
- Successor: Giovanni Doria
- Previous post: Bishop of Agrigento (1585–1589)

Orders
- Consecration: 31 March 1585 by Cesare Marullo

Personal details
- Died: 5 July 1608 Palermo, Italy

Diego Haëdo (died 5 July 1608) was a Roman Catholic prelate who served as Archbishop of Palermo (1589–1608) and Bishop of Agrigento (1585–1589).

== Biography ==
On 23 January 1585, Diego Haëdo was appointed by Pope Gregory XIII as Bishop of Agrigento. On 31 March 1585, he was consecrated bishop by Cesare Marullo, Archbishop of Palermo with Bernardo Gascó, Bishop of Mazara del Vallo, and Desiderio Mezzapica da S. Martino, Bishop of Ugento, as co-consecrators. On 14 August 1589, he was appointed by Pope Sixtus V as Archbishop of Palermo. He served as Archbishop of Palermo until his death on 5 July 1608.

While bishop, he was the principal consecrator of Juan Corrionero, Bishop of Catania (1589).

== External links and additional sources ==
- Cheney, David M. "Archdiocese of Palermo". Catholic-Hierarchy.org. (for Chronology of Bishops) ^{[self-published]}
- Chow, Gabriel. "Metropolitan Archdiocese of Palermo (Italy)". GCatholic.org. (for Chronology of Bishops) ^{[self-published]}
- Cheney, David M. "Archdiocese of Agrigento". Catholic-Hierarchy.org. (for Chronology of Bishops)^{[self-published]}
- Chow, Gabriel. "Metropolitan Archdiocese of Agrigento (Italy)". GCatholic.org. (for Chronology of Bishops) ^{[self-published]}

Catholic Church titles
Preceded by Antonio Lombardo (bishop)	Bishop of Agrigento; 1585–1589	Succeeded by Francesco del Pozzo
Preceded by Cesare Marullo	Archbishop of Palermo; 1589–1608	Succeeded by Giovanni Doria
