= Francesco del Pozzo =

Italian Catholic bishop (d. 1593)

Most Reverend Francesco del Pozzo
- Bishop of Agrigento
- Church: Catholic Church
- Diocese: Diocese of Agrigento
- In office: 1591–1593
- Predecessor: Diego Haëdo
- Successor: Juan Orozco Covarrubias y Leiva

Orders
- Consecration: 1591

Personal details
- Died: 7 March 1593 Agrigento, Italy

Francesco del Pozzo (died 7 March 1593) was a Roman Catholic prelate who served as Bishop of Agrigento (1591–1593).

== Biography ==
On 23 January 1591, Francesco del Pozzo was appointed by Pope Gregory XIV as Bishop of Agrigento. In 1591, he was consecrated bishop. He served as Bishop of Agrigento until his death on 7 March 1593.

== External links and additional sources ==
- Cheney, David M. "Archdiocese of Agrigento". Catholic-Hierarchy.org. (for Chronology of Bishops)^{[self-published]}
- Chow, Gabriel. "Metropolitan Archdiocese of Agrigento (Italy)". GCatholic.org. (for Chronology of Bishops) ^{[self-published]}

Catholic Church titles
Preceded by Diego Haëdo	Bishop of Agrigento; 1591–1593	Succeeded by Juan Orozco Covarrubias y Leiva
