= Vincenzo Bonincontro =

Most Reverend Vincenzo Bonincontro
- Bishop of Agrigento
- Church: Catholic Church
- Diocese: Diocese of Agrigento
- In office: 1607–1622
- Predecessor: Juan Orozco Covarrubias y Leiva
- Successor: Ottavio Ridolfi

Orders
- Consecration: 8 July 1607 by Ludovico de Torres

Personal details
- Died: May 1622 Agrigento, Italy

Vincenzo Bonincontro, O.P. (died 1622) was a Roman Catholic prelate who served as Bishop of Agrigento (1607–1622).

== Biography ==
Vincenzo Bonincontro was ordained a priest in the Order of Preachers. On 25 June 1607, he was appointed during the papacy of Pope Paul V as Bishop of Agrigento. On 8 July 1607, he was consecrated bishop by Ludovico de Torres, Archbishop of Monreale, with Juan de Rada, Bishop of Patti, and Metello Bichi, Bishop Emeritus of Sovana, serving as co-consecrators. He served as Bishop of Agrigento until his death in May 1622.

== Episcopal succession ==
While bishop, he was the principal co-consecrator of:

- Stefano de Vicari, Bishop of Nocera de' Pagani (1610);
- Juan de Espila, Archbishop of Acerenza e Matera (1611);
- Eleuterio Albergone, Bishop of Montemarano (1611); and
- Decius Giustiniani, Bishop of Aleria (1612).

== External links and additional sources ==
- Cheney, David M. "Archdiocese of Agrigento". Catholic-Hierarchy.org. (for Chronology of Bishops)^{[self-published]}
- Chow, Gabriel. "Metropolitan Archdiocese of Agrigento (Italy)". GCatholic.org. (for Chronology of Bishops) ^{[self-published]}

Catholic Church titles
Preceded by Juan Orozco Covarrubias y Leiva	Bishop of Agrigento; 1607–1622	Succeeded by Ottavio Ridolfi
