= Agrigento Cathedral =

Cathedral in Agrigento, Sicily, Italy

Coordinates: 37.3141°N 13.5760°E

Agrigento Cathedral Cathedral of Saint Gerland of Agrigento (Cattedrale di San Gerlando)
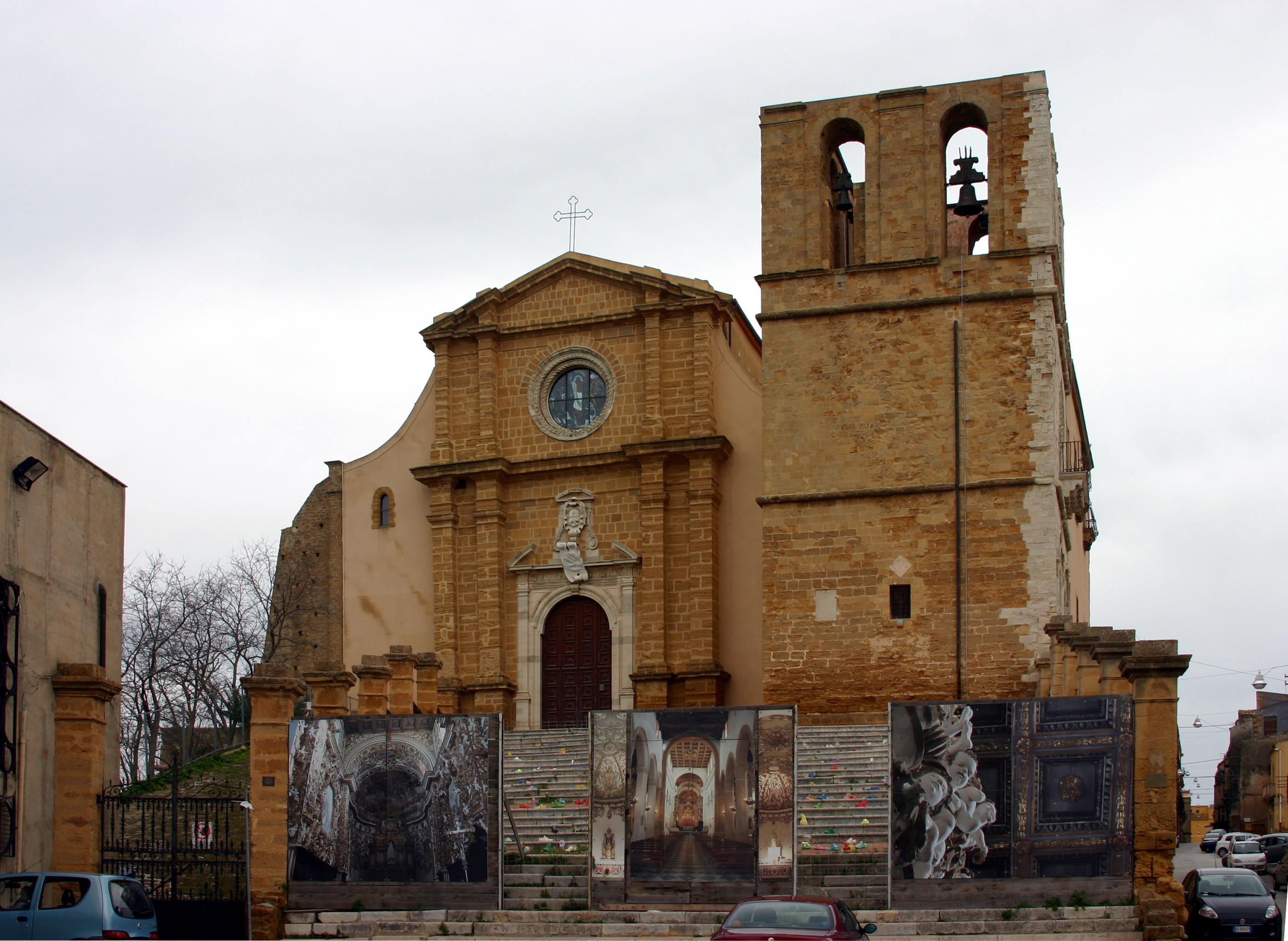

Religion
- Affiliation: Roman Catholic
- Province: Archdiocese of Agrigento

Location
- Location: Agrigento, Italy
- Interactive map of Agrigento Cathedral; Cathedral of Saint Gerland of Agrigento (Cattedrale di San Gerlando)

Architecture
- Type: Church
- Style: Romanesque
- Completed: 1099

Agrigento Cathedral (Italian: Duomo di Agrigento, Cattedrale Metropolitana di San Gerlando) is a Roman Catholic cathedral in Agrigento, Sicily, dedicated to Saint Gerland. Founded in the 11th century, it was consecrated in 1099 as the seat of the restored bishop of Agrigento. The diocese was elevated to an archdiocese in 2000, and the cathedral is thus now the seat of the Archbishop of Agrigento.

Location of Agrigento Cathedral

== Sources ==
Di Giovanni, Giuseppe: Agrigento, visita al centro storico (nd)
