= Cesare Marullo =

Roman Catholic prelate

Most Reverend Cesare Marullo
- Archbishop of Palermo
- Church: Catholic Church
- Diocese: Archdiocese of Palermo
- In office: 1577–1588
- Predecessor: Giacomo Lomellino del Canto
- Successor: Diego Haëdo
- Previous post: Bishop of Agrigento (1574–1577)

Personal details
- Died: 12 November 1588 Palermo, Italy

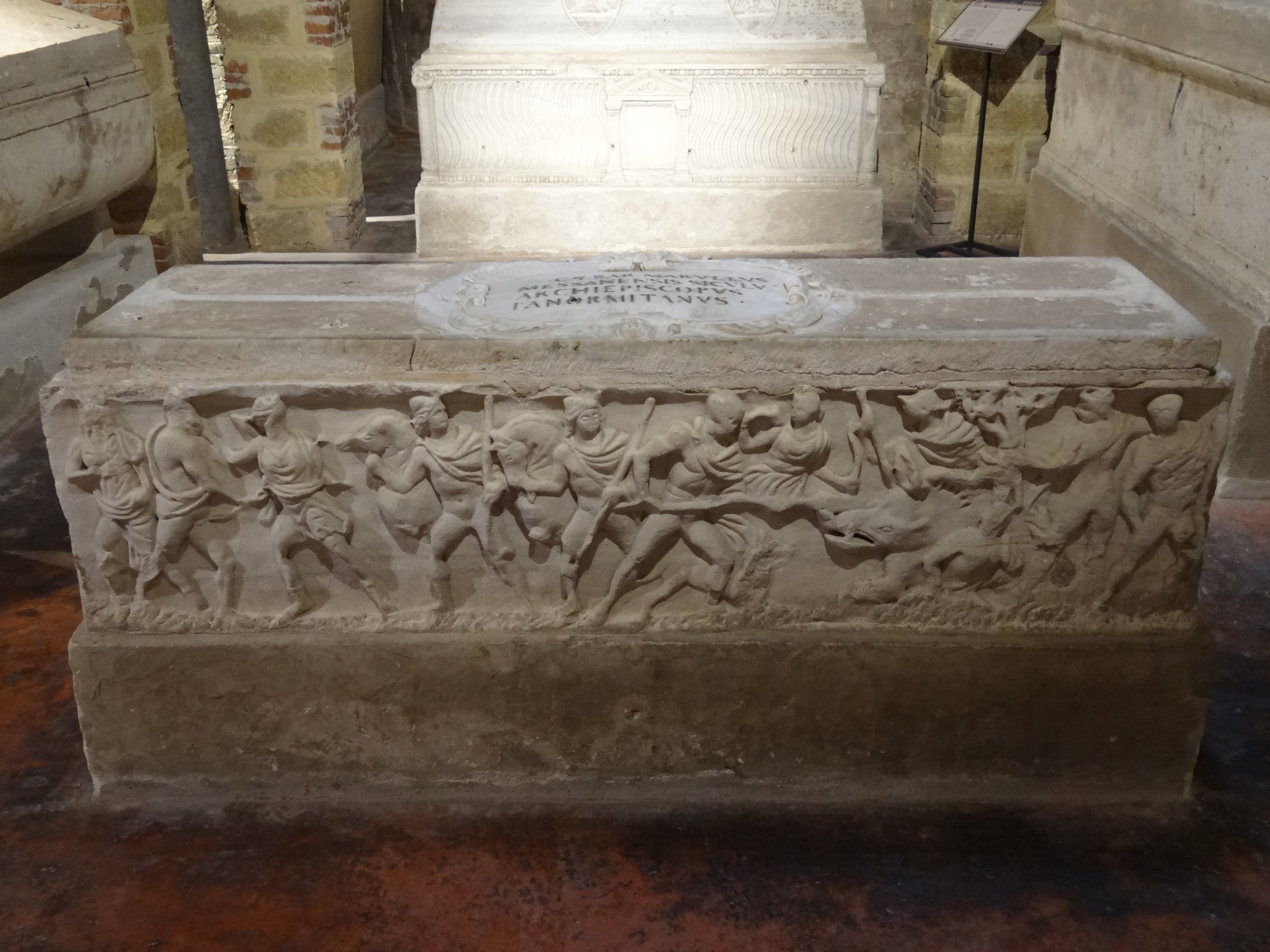
The tomb of Cesare Marullo, Archbishop of Palermo from 1577 to 1588, in the crypt of the Cathedral of Our Lady of the Assumption in Palermo, Sicily.

Cesare Marullo (died 12 November 1588) was a Roman Catholic prelate who served as Archbishop of Palermo (1577–1588) and Bishop of Agrigento (1574–1577).

== Biography ==
On 14 July 1574, Cesare Marullo was appointed by Pope Gregory XIII as Bishop of Agrigento. On 11 September 1577, he was appointed by Pope Gregory XIII as Archbishop of Palermo. He served as Archbishop of Palermo until his death on 12 November 1588.

While bishop, he was the principal consecrator of Diego Haëdo, Bishop of Agrigento (1585).

== External links and additional sources ==
- Cheney, David M. "Archdiocese of Palermo". Catholic-Hierarchy.org. (for Chronology of Bishops) ^{[self-published]}
- Chow, Gabriel. "Metropolitan Archdiocese of Palermo (Italy)". GCatholic.org. (for Chronology of Bishops) ^{[self-published]}
- Cheney, David M. "Archdiocese of Agrigento". Catholic-Hierarchy.org. (for Chronology of Bishops)^{[self-published]}
- Chow, Gabriel. "Metropolitan Archdiocese of Agrigento (Italy)". GCatholic.org. (for Chronology of Bishops) ^{[self-published]}

Catholic Church titles
| Preceded by Juan Battista de Ojeda | Bishop of Agrigento; 1574–1577 | Succeeded by Juan Rojas |
| Preceded by Giacomo Lomellino del Canto | Archbishop of Palermo; 1577–1588 | Succeeded by Diego Haëdo |
