= Gregory of Agrigento =

Bishop of Agrigento

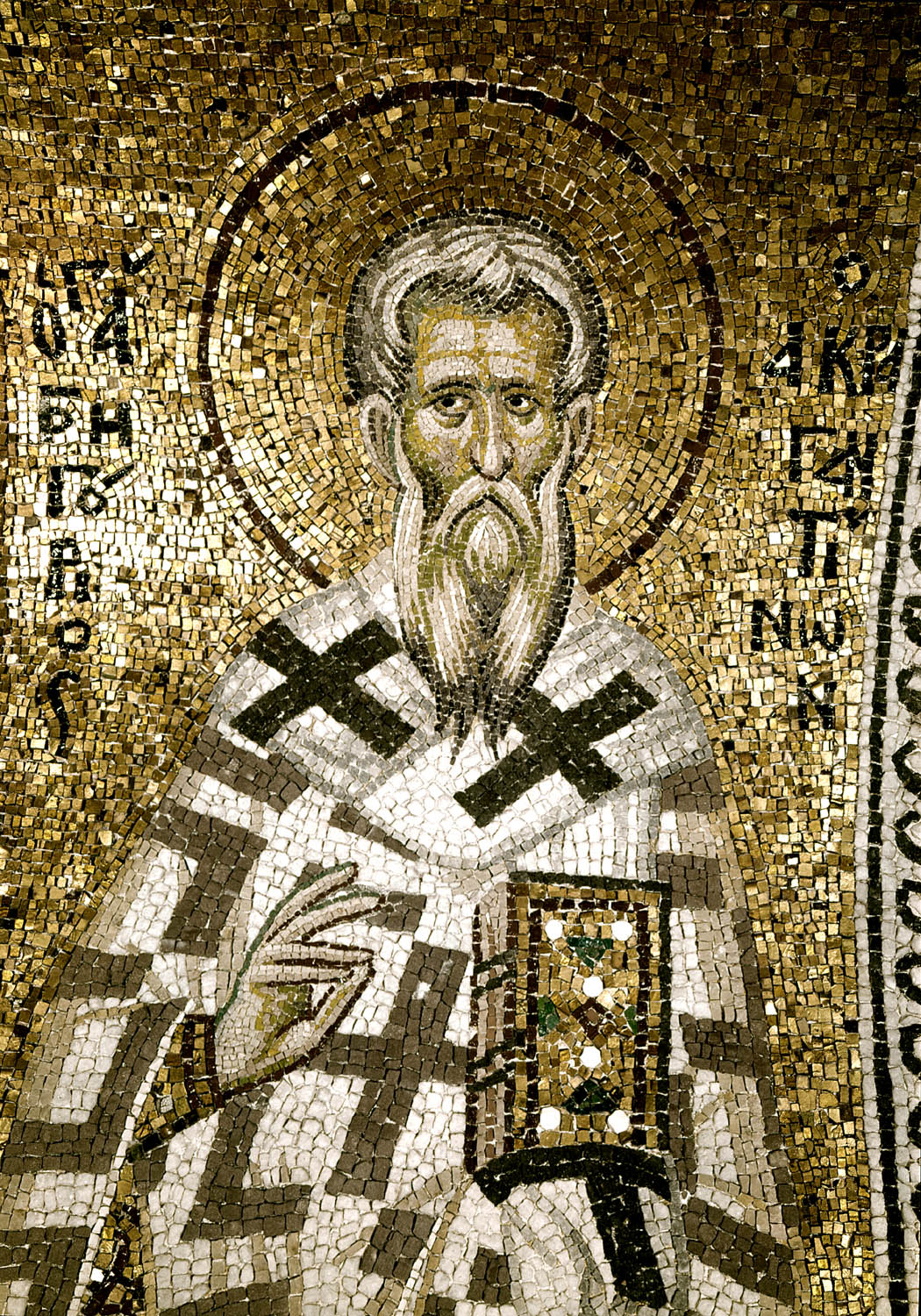
Section of a mosaic depicting Gregory on an arch in Pammakaristos Church in Istanbul (late 13th/early 14th century)

Gregory (559–630) was a Sicilian Christian prelate who served as Bishop of Agrigento (Note: Agrigento is also called Girgenti in Italian. In Latin it is Agrigentum and in Greek Akragas.) from 590 until at least 603 and was a correspondent of Pope Gregory I. He is the probable subject of two semi-legendary saint's lives and possible author of a commentary on Ecclesiastes, although both of these identifications have been questioned.

== Biography ==
According to his biography, Gregory was born near Agrigento on Sicily in 559. His mother's name was Theodote. At the age of eighteen, (Note: He is said by the Synaxarion in a self-contradictory passage to have been 18 at his ordination to the diaconate.) he went on a pilgrimage in the Holy Land, traveling via Carthage to Tripoli. He was almost sold into slavery by a naukleros (ship-owner) in Carthage. The account of his travels in his biography has a romantic character and seems to have been an influence on the 10th-century Life of Gregentios.

While in Jerusalem, he was ordained a deacon by Patriarch Makarios II (c. 563 – c. 575). He returned to Agrigento via Constantinople and Rome. In 590, (Note: The last reference to the previous bishop, Eusanius, is from 590.) two factions with their respective candidates for the vacant see of Agrigento traveled to Rome to seek the pope's decision. Pope Gregory bypassed both candidates and consecrated Gregory of Agrigento. He was found hiding in a monastic garden out of reticence for high office when Gregory chose him.

The biography attributes to Gregory an education in classics, rhetoric and theology. He is said to have read the Life of Basil of Caesarea many times and the Passion of the Holy Maccabees. At the request of a bishop, he interpreted the writings of Gregory of Nazianzus for a group of deacons. The biographer praises him as a second Chrysostom. By a miracle, he was able to fast constantly. He is also credited with performing healing miracles.

By 591, Gregory had been falsely accused of wrongdoing and was imprisoned. According to the biography, the accusers were a certain Sabinus and Crescentius. A papal letter of August 591 ordered him to appear along with the bishops of Catania and Palermo before the sub-deacon Peter, a papal agent. In November 592, the pope wrote to Bishop Maximian of Syracuse demanding that he send Gregory's accusers and some documentation to Rome without delay. In this letter, the pope refers to a letter he addressed to Gregory that has not survived. Some sources have him as deposed from his see by 594, but the pope in a letter names Gregory as still bishop in January 603. According to some sources, he died in 630.

== Hagiography ==
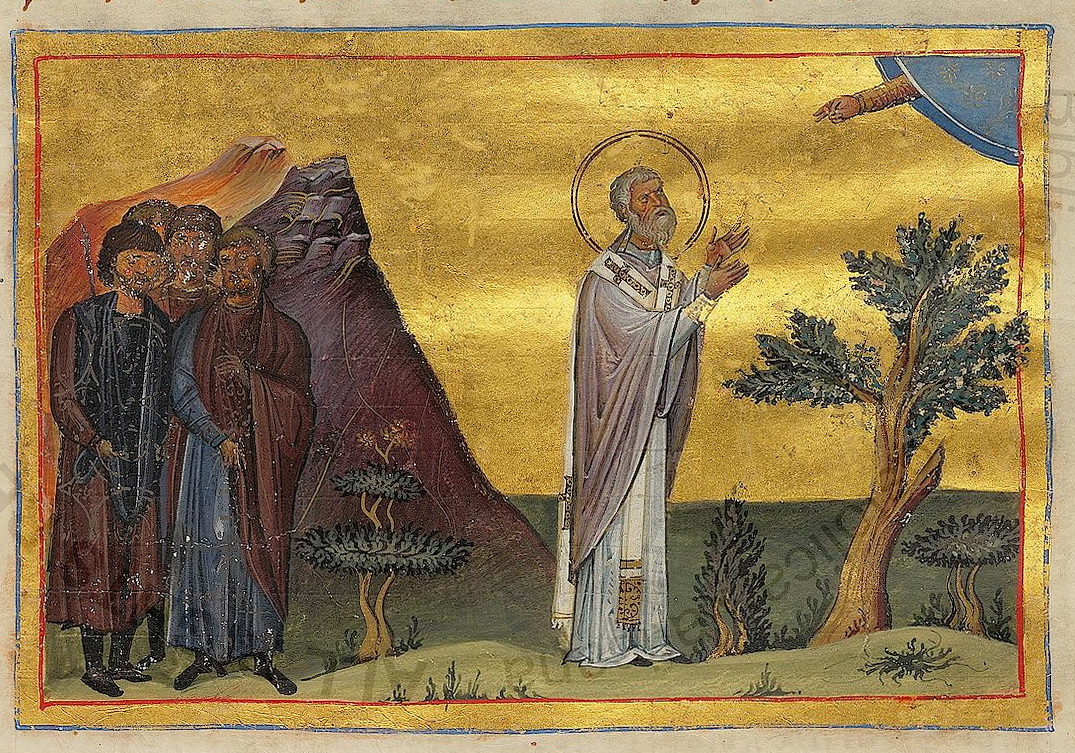
Gregory depicted in the Menologion of Basil II (c. 1000)

A life of Gregory was written by Leontios (Note: Leontios (or Leontius) is described as the hegoumenos, translated abbot or prior, of San Saba, although Berger calls him Leontios Presbyteros (Leontios the elder or priest).) of the monastery of San Saba in Rome. Its full title is An Account of the Life of Saint Gregory, Bishop of the Church of Agrigento. (Note: Greek Διήγησης εὶς τὸν βίον μακαρίου Γρηγορίου επισκόπου της Ἀκραγαντίνον ἐκκλησίας, Diegesis eis ton bion makariou Gregoriou episkopou tes Akragantinon ekklesias; conventional Latin Sancti Gregorii Agrigentini vita.) It is a lengthy work in Greek. It was translated into Latin in the 18th century by Stefano Antonio Morcelli. Its two most recent editors disagree regarding the date of its composition and its relative historicity. Albrecht Berger assigns it to the period between 750 and 828 on the grounds that it relies on the Donation of Constantine (unknown before the mid-8th century). He rejects an early date on the grounds that there is no evidence for Greek-speaking monasteries in Rome before 649. John Martyn, arguing from correspondences between the biography and the papal letters, assigns it an early date of around 640. Leontios is by some said to have died in 688, providing a terminus ante quem if he is the author.

The editors' assessments of Gregory's biography's historical value also differ. For Berger, "though it has a historical core, [it] is in large parts legendary." He does not think that the historical person at the core was the bishop. For Martyn, it is "an important, contemporary document on the cities, clergy and people of Agrigento, Jerusalem, Antioch, Constantinople and Rome during" the papacy of Gregory I and one of very few 7th-century sources on Sicily. There are contradictions in the biography and in the account in the Synaxarion of Constantinople. (Note: For this reason, Kazhdan regards the subject of the biography as a legendary figure possibly modeled on the bishop.) The latter has him alive during the patriarchate of Makarios II and the reign of the Emperor Justinian II (685–711) over a century later. The biography depicts him as a contemporary of the monothelite controversy, which began in 629. When he is arrested in Agrigento, the Emperor Justinian intervenes with the pope to secure his release. The biography depicts the Sicilian episcopate as supporting Gregory against the papacy and in general has an anti-papal tone. Morcelli, in his Latin edition, argued that the anti-papal tone stemmed from some pamphlets directed against Gregory I that circulated in Rome after his death. To Morcelli, it was evidence of the early date of the biography.

The biography of Gregory survives in twenty manuscripts. Besides the original work of Leontios (BHG 707), there is also a biography (BHG 708) by Niketas David Paphlagon (fl. c. 900). This was the text used by the compiler Simeon Metaphrastes in the 10th century. It was one of only 14 texts out of 148 that Simeon left intact and did not rework, and one of only seven that he promised the reader would give them pleasure to read. There are also two shorter reworkings of Leontios' biography, one (BHG 707p) attributed to Mark, hegoumenos of San Saba, and another (BHG 708f) anonymous.

Gregory's feast is celebrated on 23 or 24 November in the Eastern Orthodox Church. It is on 24 November in the work of Simeon Metaphrastes. It was introduced to the Roman Martyrology by Cardinal Caesar Baronius on 23 November. The popularity of Gregory's cult can be gauged by the large number of surviving iconographic representations of him.

== Commentary on Ecclesiastes ==
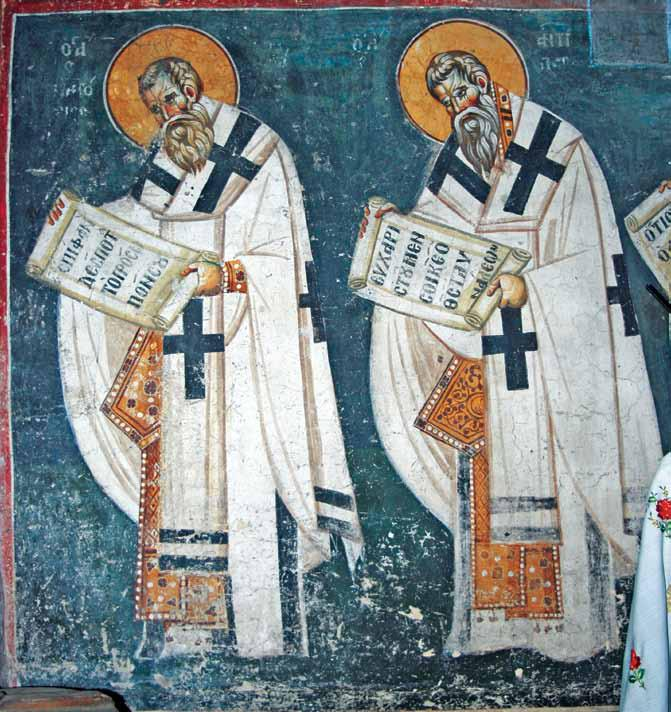
Fresco depicting Gregory and Antipas of Pergamum in the Church of St. Mary Peribleptos in Ohrid (13th century)

The hagiography supplies a list of works by Gregory, one of which was dedicated to Saint Andrew, described as "chief" (koryphaios) of the apostles. A Greek commentary on Ecclesiastes (Note: Explanatio super Ecclesiasten libri I–X in the Latin edition of Morcelli.) is traditionally attributed to the bishop of Agrigento. This attribution is rejected by some, who think the exegete must have been writing in the time of Justinian II. Since the earliest manuscripts of the commentary date from the 8th or 9th centuries, the commentator can only securely be placed in the 7th century. The result of this theory is the existence of two distinct Gregories of Agrigentum, the bishop (fl. c. 600) and the exegete (fl. c. 700).

The commentary attributed to Gregory is considered one of the best on Ecclesiastes from antiquity.

== Sources ==
- Berger, Albrecht [in German], ed. (2006). Life and Works of Saint Gregentios, Archbishop of Taphar: Introduction, Critical Edition and Translation. Millennium Studies, 7. De Gruyter.
- Cross, F. L.; Livingstone, E. A., eds. (2009) [2005]. "Gregory, St". Gregory, St (late 6th cent.), Bp. of Agrigentum (Girgenti) in Sicily. The Oxford Dictionary of the Christian Church (3rd rev. ed.). Oxford University Press. ISBN 978-0-19-280290-3.
- Demacopoulos, George E. (2013). The Invention of Peter: Apostolic Discourse and Papal Authority in Late Antiquity. University of Pennsylvania Press.
- Ferguson, Everett (1999). "Gregory of Agrigentum". In Everett Ferguson (ed.). Encyclopedia of Early Christianity (2nd ed.). Routledge. p. 491.
- Høgel, Christian (2002). Symeon Metaphrastes: Rewriting and Canonization. Museum Tusculanum Press.
- Kazhdan, Alexander (1991). "Gregory of Akragas". In Kazhdan, Alexander (ed.). The Oxford Dictionary of Byzantium. Oxford and New York: Oxford University Press. ISBN 0-19-504652-8.
- Kazhdan, Alexander (1999). A History of Byzantine Literature (650–850). Athens.
- Lanzoni, Francesco (1927). Le diocesi d'Italia dalle origini al principio del secolo VII (an. 604). Biblioteca Apostolica Vaticana.
- Martyn, John R. C., ed. (2004). The Letters of Gregory the Great. Vol. 1: Books 1–4. Pontifical Institute of Mediaeval Studies.
- Morciano, Maria Milvia (2001). "Il tempio della Concordia di Agrigento e S. Gregorio: alcune riflessioni. Dai demoni Eber e Raps ai SS. Pietro e Paolo". In Serena Bianchetti; Emilio Galvagno; Adalberto Magnelli; Gabriele Marasco; Giuseppe Mariotta; Ida Mastrorosa (eds.). Poikilma: Studi in onore di Michele R. Cataudella in occasionedel 60° compleanno. Agorà Edizioni. pp. 943–954.
- Re, Mario (2011). "Italo-Greek Hagiography". In Stephanos Efthymiadis (ed.). The Ashgate Research Companion to Byzantine Hagiography. Vol. 1: Periods and Places. Ashgate. pp. 227–258.
- Van Pelt, Julie (2020). "Disguised Identity and Recognition in the Life of Gregory of Agrigento (BHG 707)". Greek, Roman and Byzantine Studies. 60 (2).
