= Archdiocese of Agrigento =

Latin Catholic archdiocese in Italy

Coordinates: 37°19′N 13°35′E

Archdiocese of Agrigento Archidioecesis Agrigentina

Catholic
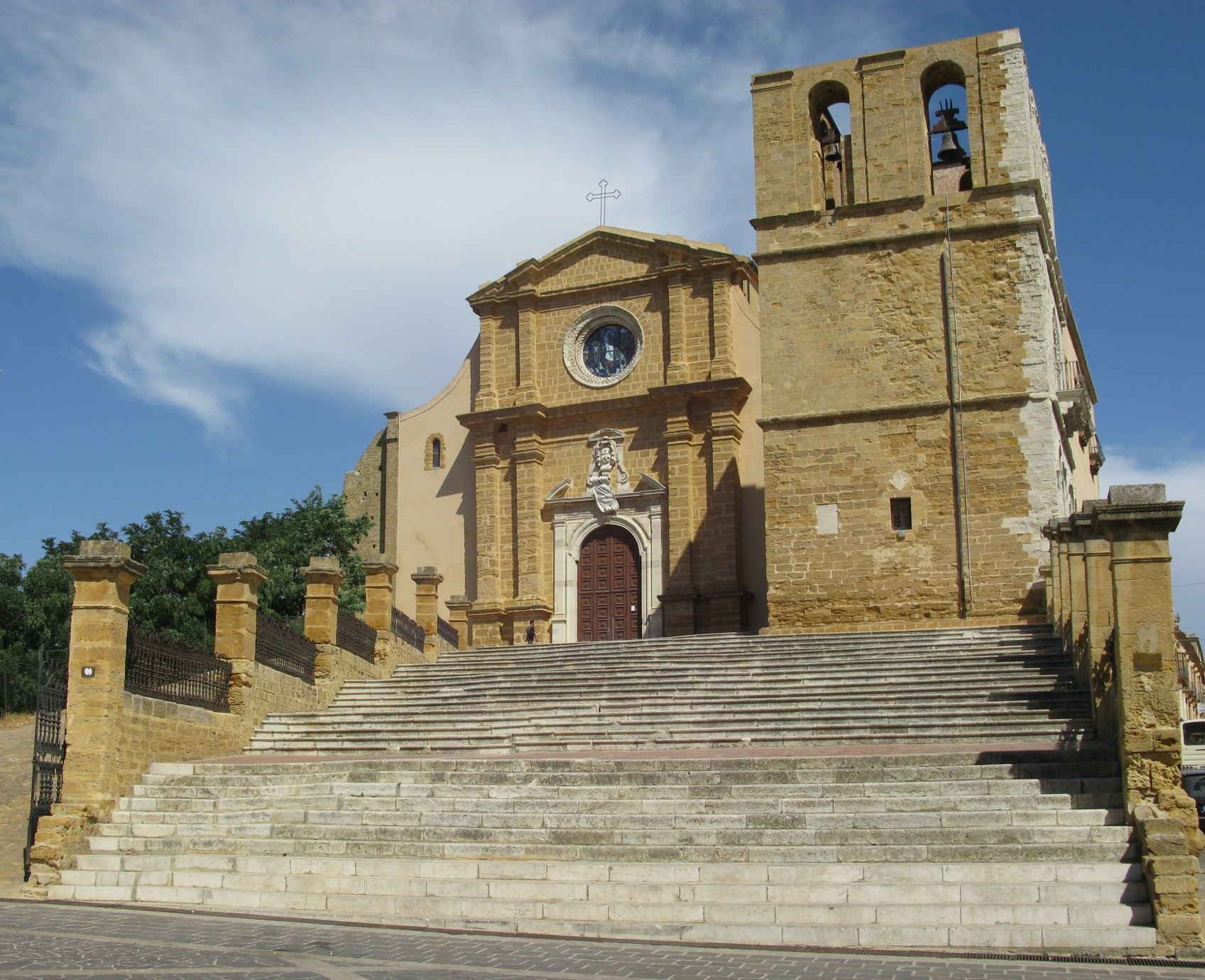
- Agrigento Cathedral

Location
- Country: Italy
- Ecclesiastical province: Agrigento

Statistics
- Area: 3,041 km^{2} (1,174 sq mi)
- Population: Total; Catholics: (as of 2023); 411,800 (est.) ▼; 386,000 (est.) ▼
- Parishes: 194

Information
- Denomination: Catholic Church
- Sui iuris church: Latin Church
- Rite: Roman Rite
- Cathedral: Cattedrale di S. Gerlando
- Secular priests: 195 (diocesan) ▼40 (Religious Orders); 36 Permanent Deacons ▼

Current leadership
- Pope: Leo XIV
- Archbishop: Alessandro Damiano
- Vicar General: Giuseppe Cumbo
- Bishops emeritus: Carmelo Ferraro; Francesco Montenegro

Map
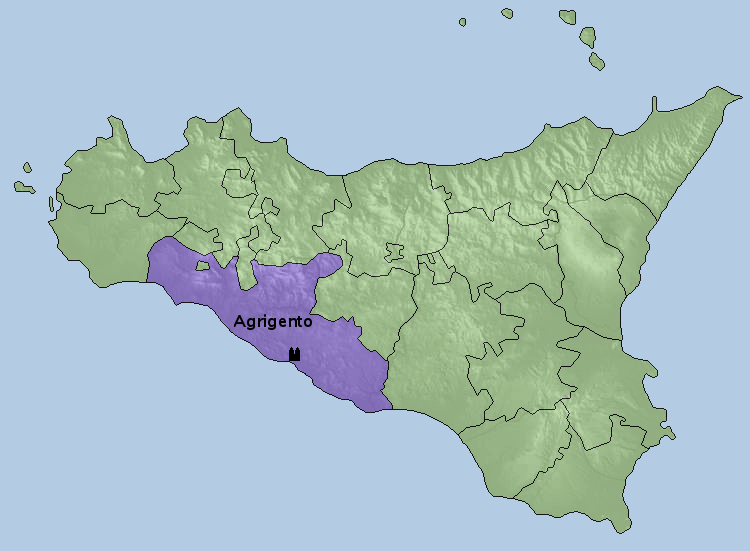

Website
- www.diocesiag.it

The Archdiocese of Agrigento (Latin: Archidioecesis Agrigentina) is a Latin Church ecclesiastical jurisdiction or archdiocese of the Catholic Church in Sicily, Italy. The historic diocese of Agrigento, was sometimes known colloquially as the Diocese of Girgenti, and Diocese of Agrigentum. From 1183, it was a suffragan of the Archdiocese of Monreale. A metropolitan see since 2000, the Archdiocese of Agrigento has two suffragan dioceses in its ecclesiastical province.

== History ==
Agrigento (the Greek Acragas, Roman Agrigentum) was founded in the early 6th century B.C. by Greeks from Gela. Legend considers Saint Libertinus its earliest proselytizer; he is said to have been sent by Saint Peter, in 44 A.D. Local enthusiasm for an Apostolic connection even led someone to forge a bull of investiture, an instrument which was not created until centuries later.

Gregory of Agrigento, said to have been martyred in 262, never existed. His name occurs in the hagiographical work, "The Life of St. Agrippina", but the author of that work, a person of the eighth or ninth century, placed the sixth century Bishop Gregory of Agrigento in the wrong context.

The earliest bishop is said to have been Potamius, who was believed by some to be a contemporary of Pope Agapetus I (535–536). Other scholars, however, place him in the seventh century. Through the 7th century, there was no metropolitan in Sicily, and each of the dioceses depended directly upon the pope. Bishop Felix of Agrigento attended the Lateran council of Pope Martin I in October 649, and Bishop Georgius attended the Lateran synod of Pope Agapetus II in October 679. The Emperor Leo III the Isaurian (717–741) removed the dioceses of Sicily, including Agrigento, from Roman control and made them suffragans of the Ecumenical Patriarchate of Constantinople. In the mid-9th (or 10th) century, Basil of Ialimbana revised the geography of George of Cyprus with the addition of a Notitia episcopuum, in which the diocese of Agrigento appears as a suffragan of Syracuse.

The succession of bishops was interrupted by the Saracen occupation of all of Sicily (879–1038).

In the spring of 1087, after several earlier raids, Count Roger d'Hauteville began the siege of Agrigento. The town surrendered in July. Pope Urban II (1088–1099) made Count Roger and his successors papal legate in Sicily.

=== The Normans ===
A bishop was again appointed for Agrigento in 1093, the Burgundian Garlando, a blood-relative of Count Roger d'Hauteville. He was consecrated a bishop by Pope Urban II. Since there was no metropolitan in Sicily, each new Latin rite bishop depended directly on Rome. In a decree of 1093, Count Roger fixed the boundaries of the diocese, which extended across central Sicily, from the Mediterranean in the south, as far east as Butera, to the Tyrrhenian Sea in the north, including territory from Terme (Termini Imerese) to a point east of Cefalù.

When the new diocese of Cefalù was established on 4 September 1131, the diocese of Agrigento lost the Tyrrhenian seacoast, and nearly all of its territory north of the Sicanian Mountains.

On 10 July 1154, Pope Adrian IV established the first Latin metropolitanate on the island of Sicily, at Palermo. Agrigento was appointed to be one of its suffragans. This was confirmed by Pope Alexander III on 25 April 1160. The bishop of Agrigento was required to swear an oath of obedience to the archbishop of Palermo annually on 15 August.

On the death of the Emperor Frederick II in 1250, his son Manfred was appointed regent in Sicily for his brother, the Emperor Conrad. when Conrad died of malaria in 1254, Manfred became regent for his nephew Conradin. On the report, untrue as it was discovered, of the death of Conradin in 1258, Manfred assumed the kingship of Sicily. He was crowned in Palermo on 10 August 1258 by Bishop Rinaldo di Acquaviva of Agrigento. For this act of defiance against Pope Alexander IV, he was excommunicated.

==== Chapter and cathedral ====
The cathedral of S. Gerlando was consecrated on 9 November 1305. The annual festival of S. Gerlando takes place on 25 February.

The cathedral is administered and served by a corporation called the Chapter, which is led by four dignities: the Dean, the Cantor, the Archdeacon, and the Treasurer, and in addition fourteen canons, up to 1567; to which six others were added later. In 1672, there were nineteen canons; in 1755, there were twenty. The Chapter had the right to elect the bishop, subject to royal and papal approval.

=== Aragonese Sicily (1282–1516) ===
As a consequence of the uprising of Easter 1282, the Angevins were driven out of Sicily, and eventually Peter III of Aragon, the husband of Constance II of Sicily, made himself king of Sicily. He was proclaimed in Palermo on 4 September 1282, over the objections of Pope Martin IV (Simon de Brie), a Freenchman, who excommunicated him.

During the great Western Schism, the Kings of Aragon, Castile, France, and Naples supported the papal authority of Avignon, rather than that of Rome. The king of Sicily followed his own wishes of the time.

In 1392, on the death of Bishop Agatho, the cathedral Chapter elected Gilford Riccobono, Archdeacon of Palermo and chamberlain of the Roman pope Boniface IX, to be bishop of Agrigento; they submitted his election certificate to Boniface IX for confirmation, which the pope was happy to do, while fulminating against the many schismatics and heretics in Sicily who were favorers of the Catalonians. Pope Clement VII (Avignon Obedience) appointed Pietro Curto (de Curtibus) bishop of Agrigento on 2 June 1393. In 1394, the Regent Martin of Aragon, nephew of King John I of Aragon arrived in Sicily, and sent messengers to Boniface IX demanding that Ricobono be sent to him. When the archbishop of Palermo Nicolaus de Agrigento died in 1395, Riccobono was named Apostolic Administrator of Palermo on 10 June 1396, and came to Palermo with the additional title of Papal Legate to Sicily, a title which the kings of Sicily had always enjoyed. Boniface also named him apostolic administrator of the diocese of Agrigento. He died in 1398.

In 1408, King Martin I of Sicily issued a decree stating that, after an election by the Chapter meeting with the queen's consent, and within the statutory time limit of six months, no bishop was to be accepted to fill a vacancy without the king's express command.

Pope Julius II, in a bull issued in Rome on 25 June 1507, granted his blood-relative and chamberlain, Giuliano Cibò, Bishop of Agrigento (1506–1537), exemption from the jurisdiction of the archbishop of Palermo.

In 1546, Ignatius of Loyola sent the first Jesuit, Jacob Lhoost, to the Island of Sicily, to Agrigento, at the request of Cardinal Rodolfo Pio da Carpi, the Administrator of the diocese of Agrigento. They were given the church of S. Margaret in Sciacca (Sacca), where they established a house in 1558, with the assistance of the duke and duchess of Bivona. Bishop Juan Orozco y Covarrubias (1594–1606) invited the Jesuits to found a college in Agrigento. He also founded a printing house in the city.

In accordance with the decrees of the Council of Trent, Bishop Cesare Marullo (1574–1577) established the priestly seminary of Agrigento. Bishop Vincenzo Bonincontro, O.P. (1607–1622) procured the Palazzo Chiaramonti and attached buildings to house the seminary. Bishop Saverio Granata (1795–1817) added physics, mathematics, and the Italian language to the curriculum of the seminary.

==== Synods ====
Bishop Didacus (Diego) Haedo (1585–1599) held a diocesan synod in 1589, and published its decrees and the diocesan statutes. Another diocesan synod was held by Bishop Vincenzo Bonincontro, O.P. (1607–1622) in 1610. Bishop Francesco Traina (1627–1651) held a diocesan synod on 3 October 1630. Bishop Ferdinando Sanchez de Cuellar, O.S.A. (1653–1657) presided at a diocesan synod held on 6–7 June 1655.

Bishop Francesco Ramírez, O.P. (1697–1715) established the Collegio of S. Agostino e Tommaso next to the seminary. He held a diocesan synod in 1703.

In 1672, the city of Agrigento had a population of about 14,000 inhabitants.

=== Bourbon Sicily (1735–1860) ===
In 1755, the city of Agrigento had about 25,000 inhabitants, in six parishes.

On 20 May 1844, Pope Gregory XVI, in the bull "In Suprema", in which he created the new ecclesiastical province of Siracusa, ordered that the diocese of Cefalù be a suffragan of Palermo, and the diocese of Agrigento a suffragan of Monreale instead of Palermo, as it had previously been. The town of Castronuovo and six others were removed from the diocese of Agrigento and assigned to the diocese of Palermo.

On 25 May 1844, the new diocese of Caltanissetta was established by Pope Gregory XVI, in the bull "Ecclesiae Universalis," and, to form its diocesan territory, fourteen towns (oppida) were taken from the diocese of Agrigento.

In the aftermath of the revolutions in 1848 in Rome and in Palermo, with the pope driven into exile and with the republicanism and anticlericalism of Giuseppe Garibaldi and Francesco Crispi spread throughout Sicily, the bishops of Sicily felt an urgent need to formulate a response. Cardinal Ferdinando Pignatelli, Archbishop of Palermo summoned a meeting of all the bishops and other prominent prelates of Sicily, including Bishop Domenico Lo Jacono of Agrigento, which met in Palermo in June and July 1850. A set of Statutes was agreed upon, the first three sections of which dealt in minute detail with the selection, training, and activities of priests and monks, none of the provisions being new or unfamiliar. The fourth dealt with the laity, emphasizing prohibitions against forbidden books, nude images, concubinage, usury, and drunkenness. Obedience to the clergy was mandated. Devotion to the Sacred Heart of Jesus, the Immaculate Heart of Mary, and the Immaculate Conception was advised. Rather than being a genuine reform, the Statutes sought to reiterate proper behavior.

In 1860, the Bourbon monarchy was overthrown, and replaced by the king of Sardinia (Savoy). His kingdom's aggression against the Papal States brought the refusal of the Papacy to recognize his right to nominate or approve bishops (exequatur). Bishops were subsequently named and approved by the pope. In Sicily, Garibaldi made himself a virtual dictator, and expelled all the Jesuits and redemptorists on the island. Fifteen Jesuit houses were closed and repurposed.

=== Basilication ===
On 2 July 1941, Pope Pius XII granted the church of S. Francis of Assisi in the city of Agrigento, with its sanctuary of the wooden statue of Mary Immaculate, the status of "minor basilica." The cathedral of S. Gerlando was granted the honorary title of "minor basilica" by Pope Pius XII on 14 December 1951. Pope John Paul II granted the status of "minor basilica" to the church of San Calogero al Monte di Sciacca in the diocese of Agrigento on 24 September 1979.

=== Archdiocese ===
An administrative reorganization of the dioceses of Sicily was approved by Pope John Paul II on 2 December 2000. The diocese of Agrigento was elevated to the status of an archdiocese, while the diocese of Piazza Armerina was removed from the ecclesiastical province of Siracusa and the diocese of Catalanissetta was removed from the province of Monreale. They become suffragan (subordinate) to the newly elevated Archdiocese of Agrigento in the new ecclesiasstical province of Agrigento.

== Bishops ==
=== to 1300 ===
- ...
- Potamius ( ? )
- Theodosius ( ? )
- Gregorius ( ? )
- Eusanius (attested 578 – 590)
- Gregorius (attested 591 – 603)
- Liberius (616)
- Felix (649)
- Georgius (679)
- Hermogenes (c. 800)
- ...
- Gerlandus (1093 – 1104)
- Drago, O.S.B. (1104)
- Guarinus, O.S.B. (1105 – after 1113)
- Albertus (1118 – )
- Gualterius (attested in 1127 – 17 April 1141)
- Rogerius (elected in 1142)
- Gentile (1154–1171)
- Bartolomeo (1171 – 1191)
- Urso (1191 – 1239)
- Rinaldo di Acquaviva (1240 – c. 1264)
- Godefredus Roncioni (1265? – 28 January 1271)
- [Guillelmus Morini] (1271)
- Guido (2 June 1273 – 1276)
- Gobertus (1276 – 23 August 1286)
- Sede Vacante (1286 – 1304)

=== 1300 to 1500 ===
- Bertaldus de Labro (10 January 1304 – 27 March 1326)
- [ Jacobus Muscus (1326) Bishop-elect ]
- Matteo Orsini, O.P. (1326 – 1327)
- Philippus Hombaldi, O.P. (1328 – 1350?)
- Octavianus de Labro (12 May 1350 – 1362)
- Matteo de Fugardo (16 March 1362 – 1390)
- Agatho (1390? – 1392) (Avignon Obedience)
- Gilifortis Riccobono (6 March 1392 – 23 October 1395) (Roman Obedience)
- Petrus de Curtibus, O.E.S.A. (2 June 1393 – 1414?) (Avignon Obedience)
- Nicolaus, O.S.B. (1395 – 1398) (Roman Obedience)
- Nicolaus de Burelli (1398 – 1400) (Roman Obedience)
- Giovanni Cardella (19 October 1400 – 1401) (Roman Obedience)
- Giovanni de Pino, O.F.M. (1401 – 1414?) (Roman Obedience ?)
- Philippus de Ferrario (4 July 1414 – ?)
- Laurentius de Messasal, O.Cist. (16 March 1422 – 1442?)
- [ Bernardo Bosco (1442) ] Bishop-elect
- Matteo da Gimara, O.F.M. (17 Sep 1442 – 1445 Resigned)
- Antonio Ponticorona, O.P. (23 Jul 1445 – 1451 Died)
- Domenico Xarth, O. Cist. (10 Jan 1452 – 1471 Died)
- Giovanni de Cardellis (11 December 1472 – February 1479)
- Juan de Castro (20 Mar 1479 – 29 Sep 1506 Died)

=== 1500 to 1818 ===
- Giuliano Cibò (5 October 1506 – 1537)
- Pietro Tagliavia d’Aragonia (1537 – 1544)
- Cardinal Rodolfo Pio (10 Oct 1544 – 2 May 1564 Died) (Administrator)
- Luigi Suppa, O.P. (13 Apr 1565 – 29 Sep 1569 Died)
- Juan Battista de Ojeda (27 Aug 1571 – 1574 Died)
- Cesare Marullo (14 Jul 1574 – 11 Sep 1577)
- Juan Rojas (1577 – 1578)
- Antonio Lombardo (bishop) (30 Mar 1579 – 23 Jan 1585)
- Diego Haëdo (23 Jan 1585 – 14 Aug 1589)
- Francesco del Pozzo (1591 – 1593 Died)
- Juan Orozco Covarrubias y Leiva (2 Dec 1594 – 16 Jan 1606)
- Vincenzo Bonincontro, O.P. (25 Jun 1607 – May 1622 Died)
- Ottavio Ridolfi (20 Mar 1623 – 6 Jul 1624 Died)
- Francesco Traina (2 Mar 1627 – Oct 1651 Died)
- Ferdinando Sanchez de Cuellar, O.S.A. (26 May 1653 – 4 Jan 1657)
- Francesco Gisulfo e Osorio (30 Sep 1658 – Dec 1664 Died)
- Ignazio d'Amico (15 Dec 1666 – 15 Dec 1668 Died)
- Francesco Giuseppe Crespos de Escobar (2 May 1672 – 17 May 1674)
- Francesco Maria Rini (Rhini), O.F.M. (19 Oct 1676 – 4 Aug 1696 Died)
- Francesco Ramírez, O.P. (26 Aug 1697 – 27 Aug 1715 Died)
- Anselmo de la Peña, O.S.B. (27 Sep 1723 – 4 Aug 1729)
- Lorenzo Gioeni d'Aragona (11 Dec 1730 – Oct 1754 Died)
- Andrea Lucchesi-Palli (21 Jul 1755 – 4 Oct 1768 Died)
- Antonio Lanza, C.R. (20 Nov 1769 – 24 May 1775 Died)
- Antonio Branciforte Colonna (15 Apr 1776 – 31 Jul 1786 Died)
- Antonino Cavalieri (15 Sep 1788 – 11 Dec 1792 Died)
- Saverio Granata, C.R. (1 Jun 1795 – 29 Apr 1817)

=== since 1818 ===
- Baldassare Leone (2 Oct 1818 – 22 Jul 1820 Died)
- Pietro Maria d'Agostino (17 Nov 1823 – 18 Jul 1835)
- Sede vacante (1835–1837)
- Ignazio Giuseppe Nicola Epifanio Montemagno, O.F.M. Conv. (2 Oct 1837 – 1839)
- Sede vacante (1839–1844)
- Domenico-Maria-Giuseppe Lo Jacono, C.R. (17 Jun 1844 – 1860)
- Sede vacante (1860–1872)
- Domenico Turano (23 Feb 1872 – 2 Feb 1885 Died)
- Gaetano Blandini (2 Feb 1885 – 19 May 1898)
- Bartolomeo Maria Lagumina (28 Nov 1898 – 5 May 1931)
- Giovanni Battista Peruzzo, C.P. (15 Jan 1932 – 20 Jul 1963)
- Giuseppe Petralia (14 Oct 1963 – 2 May 1980 Resigned)
- Luigi Bommarito (2 May 1980 – 1 Jun 1988) Appointed, Archbishop of Catania
- Carmelo Ferraro (3 Nov 1988 – 1 Dec 2000)

== Archbishops ==
- Carmelo Ferraro (2 Dec 2000 – 23 Feb 2008 Resigned)
- Cardinal Francesco Montenegro (23 Feb 2008 – 22 May 2021)
- Alessandro Damiano (22 May 2021 – present)

== Suffragan sees ==
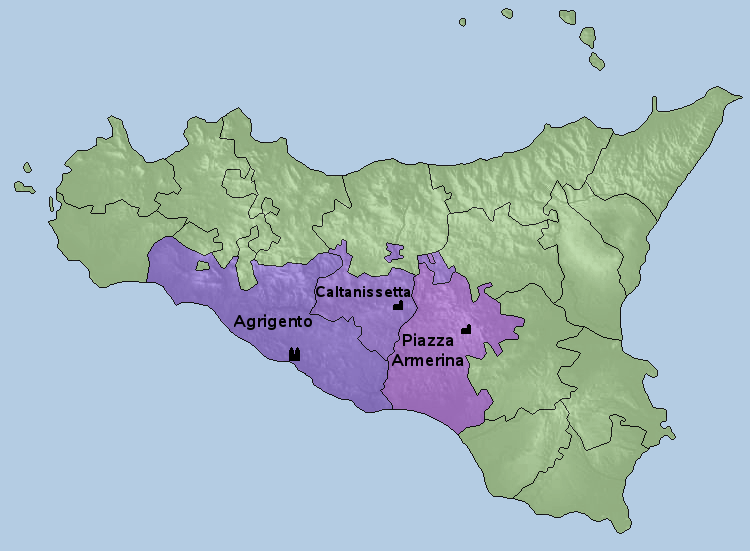
Ecclesiastical province of Agrigento

- Diocese of Caltanissetta
- Diocese of Piazza Armerina

== Additional sources ==
=== Reference Works ===
- Eubel, Conradus, ed. (1913). Hierarchia catholica (in Latin). Vol. 1 (Tomus 1) (second ed.). Münster: Libreria Regensbergiana.
- Eubel, Conradus, ed. (1914). Hierarchia catholica (in Latin). Vol. 2 (Tomus 2) (second ed.). Münster: Libreria Regensbergiana.
- Eubel, Conradus, ed. (1923). Hierarchia catholica (in Latin). Vol. 3 (Tomus 3) (second ed.). Münster: Libreria Regensbergiana.
- Gams, Pius Bonifatius (1873). Series episcoporum Ecclesiae catholicae: quotquot innotuerunt a beato Petro apostolo. Ratisbon: Typis et Sumptibus Georgii Josephi Manz. pp. 946–947. (Use with caution; obsolete)
- Gauchat, Patritius (Patrice) (1935). Hierarchia catholica (in Latin). Vol. IV (1592-1667). Münster: Libraria Regensbergiana.
- Ritzler, Remigius; Sefrin, Pirminus (1952). Hierarchia catholica medii et recentis aevi (in Latin). Vol. V (1667-1730). Patavii: Messagero di S. Antonio.
- Ritzler, Remigius; Sefrin, Pirminus (1958). Hierarchia catholica medii et recentis aevi (in Latin). Vol. 6 (1730-1799). Patavii: Messagero di S. Antonio.
- Ritzler, Remigius; Sefrin, Pirminus (1968). Hierarchia Catholica medii et recentioris aevi (in Latin). Vol. 7 (1800–1846). Monasterii: Libr. Regensburgiana.
- Ritzler, Remigius; Sefrin, Pirminus (1978). Hierarchia catholica Medii et recentioris aevi (in Latin). Vol. 8 (1846–1903). Il Messaggero di S. Antonio.
- Pięta, Zenon (2002). Hierarchia catholica medii et recentioris aevi (in Latin). Vol. 9 (1903–1922). Padua: Messagero di San Antonio. ISBN 978-88-250-1000-8.

=== Studies ===
- D'Avino, Vincenzio (1848). Cenni storici sulle chiese arcivescovili, vescovili, e prelatizie (nullius) del regno delle due Sicilie (in Italian). Naples: dalle stampe di Ranucci. pp. 265–267. [article by Canon Treasurer Ereclide Lo Preste]. Archived.
- Backman, Clifford R. (2002). The Decline and Fall of Medieval Sicily: Politics, Religion, and Economy in the Reign of Frederick III, 1296-1337. Cambridge University Press. ISBN 978-0-521-52181-9.
- Cappelletti, Giuseppe (1870). Le chiese d'Italia dalla loro origine sino ai nostri giorni (in Italian). Vol. vigesimoprimo (21). Venezia: Antonelli. pp. 595–606.
- Collura, P. (ed.) (1960). "Libellus de Successione Pontificum Agrigentini," (in Latin and Italian), in: Collura, Le piu antiche Carte dell'archivio capitolare di Agrigento (1092–1282). Palermo 1960.
- Craparotta, Ilenia; Grisanti, Nicoletta (editors) (2009). Francescanesimo e cultura nella provincia di Agrigento: atti del convegno di studio, Agrigento 26-28 ottobre 2006. (in Italian). Palermo: Officina di Studi Medievali, 2009.
- Gallo, Andrea (1846). Codice ecclesiastico sicolo contenente le costituzioni, i capitoli del Regno, le sanzioni, le prammatiche, i reali dispacci, le leggi, i decreti, i reali rescritti ed altri documenti relativi alle materie del diritto ecclesiastico sicolo, dalla fondazione della monarchia siciliana sino a' nostri giorni. Volume 2. Palermo: Stamperia Carini, 1846.
- Lanzoni, Francesco (1927). Le diocesi d'Italia dalle origini al principio del secolo VII (an. 604) (in Italian). Rome: Biblioteca Apostolica Vaticana.
- Kamp, Norbert (1975). Kirche und Monarchie im staufischen Königreich Sizilien: I. Prosopographische Grundlegung, Bistumer und Bischofe des Konigreichs 1194–1266: 3. Sizilien München: Wilhelm Fink 1975, pp. .
- Noto, Angelo (1963). Notizie storiche del seminario di Argigento (1860-1963). (in Italian). Agrigento: Edizioni del Seminario, 1963.
- Pirro, Rocco (1733). Mongitore, Antonino (ed.). Sicilia sacra disquisitionibus et notitiis illustrata. Vol. Tomus primus (third ed.). Palermo: haeredes P. coppulae.
- Russo, Giuseppe (1877). Notizie sui sette santi vescovi della Chiesa agrigentina. (in Italian and Latin). Girgenti: Tip. L. Carini, 1877.
- Savagnone, F. Guglielmo (1912). "Concili e sinodi di Sicilia," (in Italian), in: Atti della reale Accademia di scienze, lettere e belle arti di Palermo terza serie, Vol. 9. Palermo: Impresa generale d'Affissione e Publicità, 1912. pp. 3-212 + Appendice.
- Schirò, Giuseppina (2014). Ecclesia Agrigenti. Note di storia e archeologia urbana. Palermo: Antipodes 2014.
