= Antonio Lombardo (bishop) =

Italian Roman Catholic prelate

Most Reverend Antonio Lombardo
- Archbishop of Messina
- Church: Catholic Church
- Archdiocese: Archdiocese of Messina
- In office: 1585–1597
- Predecessor: Giovanni Retana
- Successor: Francisco Velarde de la Cuenca

Personal details
- Died: 13 September 1597 Messina, Italy

Antonio Lombardo (died 1597) was a Roman Catholic prelate who served as Archbishop of Messina (1585–1597), Bishop of Agrigento (1579–1585), and Bishop of Mazara del Vallo (1573–1579).

== Biography ==
On 16 January 1573, Antonio Lombardo was appointed during the papacy of Pope Gregory XIII as Bishop of Mazara del Vallo. On 30 March 1579, he was appointed during the papacy of Pope Gregory XIII as Bishop of Agrigento. On 23 January 1585, he was appointed during the papacy of Pope Gregory XIII as Archbishop of Messina. He served as Archbishop of Messina until his death on 13 September 1597.

== External links and additional sources ==
- Cheney, David M. "Diocese of Mazara del Vallo". Catholic-Hierarchy.org. (for Chronology of Bishops) ^{[self-published]}
- Chow, Gabriel. "Diocese of Mazara del Vallo (Italy)". GCatholic.org. (for Chronology of Bishops) ^{[self-published]}
- Cheney, David M. "Archdiocese of Agrigento". Catholic-Hierarchy.org. (for Chronology of Bishops)^{[self-published]}
- Chow, Gabriel. "Metropolitan Archdiocese of Agrigento (Italy)". GCatholic.org. (for Chronology of Bishops) ^{[self-published]}
- Cheney, David M. "Archdiocese of Messina-Lipari-Santa Lucia del Mela". Catholic-Hierarchy.org. (for Chronology of Bishops) ^{[self-published]}
- Chow, Gabriel. "Archdiocese of Messina-Lipari-Santa Lucia del Mela (Italy)". GCatholic.org. (for Chronology of Bishops) ^{[self-published]}

Catholic Church titles
Preceded by Juan Beltrán de Guevara	Bishop of Mazara del Vallo; 1573–1579	Succeeded by Bernardo Gascó
Preceded by Juan Rojas	Bishop of Agrigento; 1579–1585	Succeeded by Diego Haëdo
Preceded by Giovanni Retana	Archbishop of Messina; 1585–1597	Succeeded by Francisco Velarde de la Cuenca
