= Mogavero =

Mogavero is an Italian surname. Notable people with the surname include:

- Damian Mogavero, American entrepreneur and author
- Domenico Mogavero (born 1947), Italian Roman Catholic bishop
