= Diocese of Cefalù =

Roman Catholic diocese in Italy

Coordinates: 38.0333°N 14.0167°E

Diocese of Cefalù Dioecesis Cephaludensis

Catholic
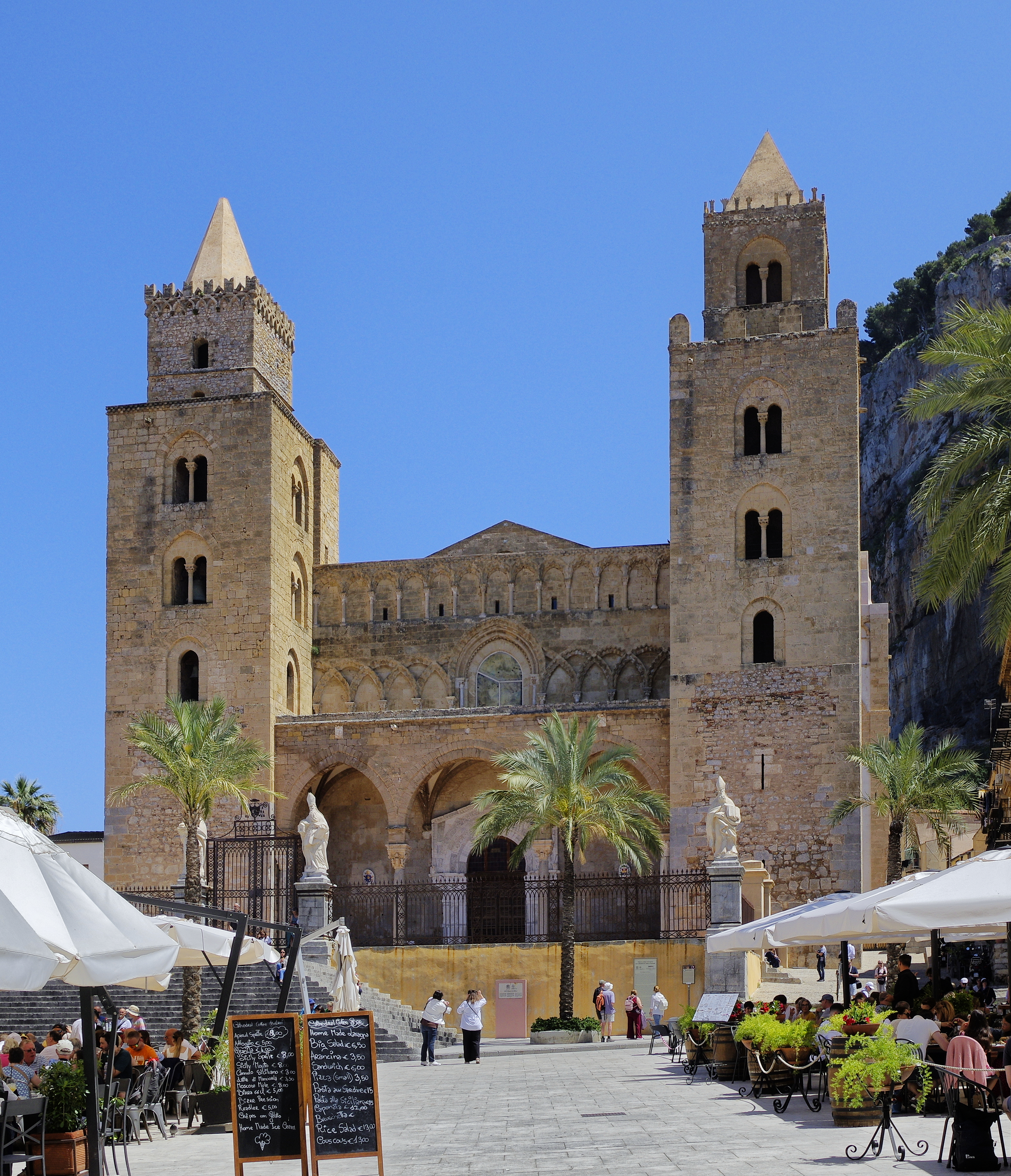
- Cefalù Cathedral

Location
- Country: Italy
- Ecclesiastical province: Palermo

Statistics
- Area: 1,718 km^{2} (663 sq mi)
- Population: Total; Catholics: (as of 2023); 115,318 ▼; 112,448 ▼ (97.5%)
- Parishes: 53

Information
- Denomination: Catholic Church
- Rite: Roman Rite
- Established: 1131 (894–895 years ago)
- Cathedral: Basilica Cattedrale della Trasfigurazione
- Secular priests: 56 (diocesan); 17 (Religious Orders); 10 Permanent Deacons

Current leadership
- Pope: Leo XIV
- Bishop: Giuseppe Marciante
- Bishops emeritus: Vincenzo Manzella

Map
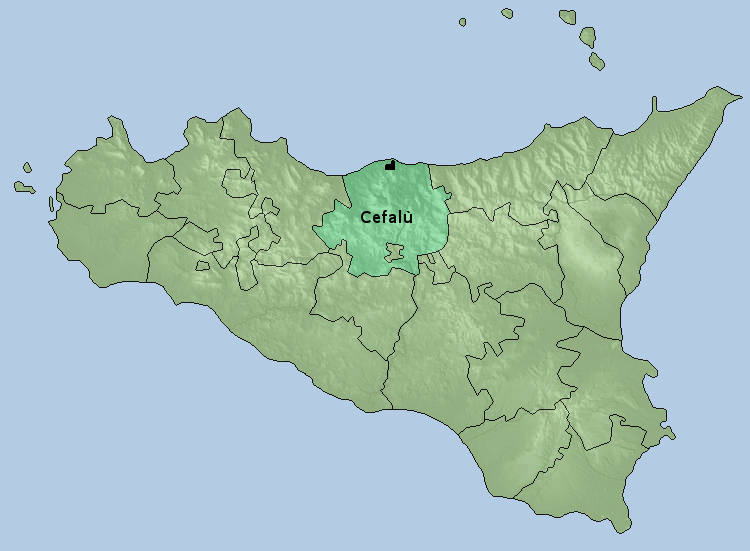

Website
- Diocesan web site

The Diocese of Cefalù (Latin: Dioecesis Cephaludensis) is a Latin diocese of the Catholic Church in north-central Sicily. Under the Greek church in the 8th and 9th centuries, it was a suffragan of the metropolitanate of Syracuse in the Patriarchate of Constantinople. When the Latin rite diocese was founded under the Normans, in 1131, it became a suffragan of the archdiocese of Messina. In 2000, Pope John Paul II made the diocese of Cefalù a suffragan of the Archdiocese of Palermo.

== History ==
Girolamo di Marzo Ferro (1860) believed that the diocese was founded in the fifth century. At that time Sicily's dioceses were directly subject to the Papacy. The Emperor Leo III the Isaurian (717–741) removed the dioceses of Sicily, including Cefalù, from Roman control and made them suffragans of the Ecumenical Patriarchate of Constantinople. In the mid-9th (or 10th) century, Basil of Ialimbana revised the geography of George of Cyprus with the addition of a Notitia episcopuum, in which the diocese of Cefalù appears as a suffragan of Syracuse.

The first known bishop of Cefalù was Nicetas, a bishop of the Greek rite and a suffragan of the metropolitan of Syracuse.

Following Nicetas, the Arab occupation of Sicily made the regular election of bishops impossible.

=== Latin rite bishops ===
When the Normans established the diocese of Agrigento in 1093, Count Roger d'Hauteville fixed the boundaries of the diocese, which extended across central Sicily, from the Mediterranean in the south, to the Tyrrhenian Sea in the north. It included territory from Terme (Termini Imerese) to a point east of Cefalù, making most of the later diocese of Cefalù part of the diocese of Agrigento.

When King Roger II of Sicily (1130–1154), rebuilt the city, the diocese was refounded as a Latin bishopric. Pope Anacletus II assigned it as a suffragan of the new archdiocese of Messina. The king appointed Iocelmus, the prior of the Augustinian monastery of Santa Maria de Balnearia as the first bishop, or rather bishop-elect. The evidence from 1136 to 1166 consistently refers to bishops Iocelmus, Harduinus, Daniel, and Boso. as "bishop-elect".

The coronation ceremonies of King James II of Aragon as king of Sicily took place in Palermo on 2 February 1286. The ritual was performed by Bishops Iuncta de Magistro Benintendi de Panormo of Cefalù, Philip of Squillace, and Tancredo of Nicastro. On 11 April 1286, Pope Honorius IV, whose policy favored the Angevin kings of Naples, excommunicated King James and his wife Constantia. On 18 November 1286, the pope deprived Bishop Iuncta and all his followers of their episcopal dignity, and ordered the papal legate, Cardinal Gerardo Bianchi, to depose them. The papal pique was pointless, since the new king of Naples since the death of Charles I of Naples, Charles of Salerno, had been captured by the Aragonese after the battle of Nisida on 5 June 1284, and was being held in prison in Cefalù.

During the episcopate of Bishop Jacobus de Nernia (1304–1324), nearly all the properties belonging to the Church of Cefalù were appropriated by Sancho of Aragon, the illegitimate brother of King Frederick III of Sicily, who in 1304 was outfitting an expedition to the Aegean.

A confirmation of the privileges of the Church of Cefalù, granted by King Martin and Queen Maria on 10 June 1392, names King Roger as the ecclesiae ejusdem fundator (founder of that Church).

=== Chapter and cathedral ===
The Cathedral of the Holy Saviour was planned and begun under orders of King Roger II of Sicily in 1131, with the blessing of Pope Anacletus II (1130–1138). The mosaics were commissioned by King Roger II in 1148. The basilica was consecrated on 10 April 1267, by Cardinal Rodolfo, Bishop of Albano, the Papal Legate. From its beginning the cathedral was served by a chapter which followed the rule of S. Augustine (O.S.A.). In 1671, however, under Bishop Giovanni Roano e Carrionero, the Chapter was converted by Pope Clement X into a corporation of secular priests. In accordance with Pope Clement's bull, the Chapter was composed of four dignities (Dean, Archdeacon, Cantor and Theologian) and eight Canons.

In the century between 1276 and 1376, for which there happens to be documentary evidence, the city of Cefalù saw its population drop from c. 11,000 to c. 2000. The Black Death no doubt played a major role in that catastrophe, though the Sicilian Vespers (which began in 1282) played a part.

=== Earthquake of 1823 ===
On 5 March 1823 a major earthquake and a significant aftershock struck the entire northern coast of the island of Sicily. At Cefalù there was a tsunami that washed boats out to sea. The Gazzetta di Genoa reported that the upper part of the campanile of the convent of S. Francesco had fallen, and the convent of S. Pasquale had been destroyed, but that there had been no loss of life.

When the Diocese of Caltanissetta was established by Pope Gregory XVI on 25 May 1844, the parish and territory of the town of Vallelunga was removed from the diocese of Cefalù.

A well-known native son of the diocese of Cefalù was Cardinal Mariano Rampolla del Tindaro, who was born in the village of Polizzi. Rampolla was Pope Leo XIII's Secretary of State, and was the leading candidate to succeed him in the Conclave of 1903. Rampolla was vetoed, however, by the government of Franz Joseph I of Austria.

On the petition of Bishop Emanuele Catarinicchia (1978–1987), in compliance with the regulations issued by the Sacred Congregation of Rites, Pope John Paul II granted the parish church of San Pietro in the town of Collesano, in the mountains southwest of Cefalù, the honor, rank, and privileges of a minor basilica on 4 January 1983.

=== Reorganization of Sicilian ecclesiastical structure ===
In 2000, after extensive consultation with the Italian Episcopal Conference and the Congregation of Bishops, Pope John Paul II ordered a reorganization of the dioceses in Sicily. In the Apostolic Constitution "Ad maiori consulendum" of 2 December 2000, the diocese of Cefalù was removed from the ecclesiastical province of Messina and transferred to the ecclesiastical province of Palermo.

== Bishops of Cefalù ==
Latin rite: Erected: 1131

=== to 1400 ===
- Iocelmo (c. 1140 – 1150)
- Harduinus (Arduino) (c.1150 – 1156)
- Boso (1157–1173)
- ? Joannes (or Guido) de Bavera
- Guido de Anania (1173–1193)
- Benedictus, O.S.A.
- Ioannes Cicala (1194 – after September 1215)
- Aldoinus (Arduino) (attested 18 May 1217 – 1248)
- Riccardus de Logotheta, O.Min. (attested 1249 – 10 June 1253)
- Thomas Fusconis de Berta, O.P. (30 September 1253 – 13 December 1253)
- Ioannes Stephani (9 February 1254 – after 15 March 1271)
- Petrus de Taurino (attested 28 December 1271 – 12 August 1274)
- Ioannes Francigena (attested 3 April 1275 – 8 June 1280)
- Iuncta de Magistro Benintendi de Panormo (attested 15 January 1281 – 1290)
- Jacobus de Nernia (10 January 1304 – 1324)
- Rogerius de S. Joanne (22 January 1324 – 1329)

○ [ Thomas de Butera (1329–1333) ]

- Robertus Campuli, O.Min. (14 October 1333 – 1342)
- Galganus Blasii, O.Min. (20 November 1342 – 1351)
- Nicolaus de Burellis (14 October 1353 – )
- Guilelmus de Salamone, O.Min. (18 March 1388 – 1397)

Sede Vacante

=== from 1400 to 1600 ===
- Julianus, O.P. (31 March 1406 – )
- Antonius de Florentia, O.Min. (11 March 1412 – )
- Philippus (27 August 1414 – )
- Antonio Ponticorona, O.P. (20 November 1422 – 23 Jul 1445)
- Luca de Sarzana, O.F.M. (23 Jul 1445 – 1471 Died)
- Giovanni Gatto (1 Jun 1472 – 18 Aug 1475)
- Bernardo Margarit, O.S.B. (18 Aug 1475 – 8 Feb 1479)
- Giovanni Gatto (8 Feb 1479 – 1484)
- Francesco de Noya, O.F.M. (26 Nov 1484 – 18 Apr 1492 Died)
- Paolo Della Cavalleria (30 Mar 1495 – 1496 Died)
- Rinaldo Montoro e Landolina, O.P. (12 Oct 1496 – 1511 Died)
- Juan Requeséns (18 Jan 1512 – 1517 Resigned)
- Juan Sánchez (bishop) (4 Nov 1517 – 1518 Died)
- Cardinal Guillén-Ramón de Vich y de Vallterra (22 Oct 1518 – 7 Jun 1525)
- Francisco de Aragón (7 Jun 1525 – 22 Jun 1561 Died)
- Antonino Faraone (17 Apr 1562 – 9 Feb 1569)
- Rodrigo de Vadillo, O.S.B. (9 Feb 1569 – 1 Feb 1578 Died)
- Ottaviano Preconio (11 Aug 1578 – 11 Apr 1587 Died)
- Francesco Gonzaga, O.F.M. Obs. (26 Oct 1587 – 29 Jan 1593)
- Nicolò Stizzia (23 May 1594 – 17 Feb 1596 Died)
- Manuel Quero Turillo (18 Dec 1596 – 2 Sep 1605 Died)

=== from 1600 to 1800 ===
- Martino Mira (29 Jan 1607 – 1619 Died)
- Manuel Esteban Muniera, O. de M. (29 Mar 1621 – 14 Oct 1631 Died)
- Ottavio Branciforte (10 Jan 1633 – 2 Mar 1638)
- Pietro Corsetto (21 Jun 1638 – 23 Oct 1643 Died)
- Marco Antonio Gussio (23 May 1644 – 22 Aug 1650)
- Francesco Gisulfo e Osorio (21 Nov 1650 – 30 Sep 1658)
- Giovanni Roano e Corrionero (16 Feb 1660 – 27 Nov 1673)
- Matteo Orlandi, O. Carm. (25 Jun 1674 – 13 Nov 1695 Died)
- José Sanz de Villaragut, O.F.M. (18 Jun 1696 – 29 Aug 1698 Died)
- Joseph Antoine Muscella, O.F.M. (25 Sep 1702 – 22 Jun 1716 Died)
- Domenico di Val Guarnera, C.Orat. (17 Nov 1732 – 2 May 1751 Died)
- Agatino Maria Reggio Statella (17 Jul 1752 – 16 Jan 1755 Resigned)
- Gioacchino Castello (21 Jul 1755 – 12 Jul 1788 Died)
- Francesco Vanni, C.R. (30 Mar 1789 – 29 Nov 1803 Died)

=== since 1800 ===
- Domenico Spoto (28 May 1804 – 29 Dec 1808 Died)
- Giovanni Sergio (19 Dec 1814 – 27 Feb 1827 Died)
- Pietro Tasca (17 Sep 1827 – 2 Jan 1839 Died)
- Giovanni Maria Visconte Proto, O.S.B. (17 Jun 1844 – 13 Oct 1854 Died)
- Ruggero Blundo, O.S.B. (15 Mar 1858 – 18 Mar 1888 Died)
- Gaetano d'Alessandro (18 Mar 1888 – 8 May 1906 Resigned)
- Anselmo Evangelista Sansoni, O.F.M. (30 Oct 1907 – 18 Jun 1921 Died)
- Giovanni Pulvirenti (19 Aug 1922 – 11 Sep 1933 Died)
- Emiliano Cagnoni (5 May 1934 – 28 Sep 1969 Died)
- Calogero Lauricella (4 Jun 1970 – 8 Sep 1973 Appointed, Archbishop of Siracusa)
- Salvatore Cassisa (1 Dec 1973 – 11 Mar 1978 Appointed, Archbishop of Monreale)
- Emanuele Catarinicchia (11 Nov 1978 – 7 Dec 1987 Appointed, Bishop of Mazara del Vallo)
- Rosario Mazzola (23 Jul 1988 – 18 Mar 2000 Retired)
- Francesco Sgalambro (18 Mar 2000 – 17 Sep 2009 Retired)
- Vincenzo Manzella (17 Sep 2009 – )

== Books ==
=== Reference Works ===
- Eubel, Conradus, ed. (1913). Hierarchia catholica (in Latin). Vol. 1 (Tomus 1) (second ed.). Münster: Libreria Regensbergiana. pp. 181–182.. Archived.
- Eubel, Conradus, ed. (1914). Hierarchia catholica (in Latin). Vol. 2 (Tomus 2) (second ed.). Münster: Libreria Regensbergiana. p. 125.. Archived.
- Eubel, Conradus, ed. (1923). Hierarchia catholica (in Latin). Vol. 3 (Tomus 3) (second ed.). Münster: Libreria Regensbergiana. p. 163.. Archived.
- Gams, Pius Bonifatius (1873). Series episcoporum Ecclesiae catholicae: quotquot innotuerunt a beato Petro apostolo. Ratisbon: Typis et Sumptibus Georgii Josephi Manz. pp. 946–947. (Use with caution; obsolete)
- Gauchat, Patritius (Patrice) (1935). Hierarchia catholica (in Latin). Vol. IV (1592-1667). Münster: Libraria Regensbergiana.
- Ritzler, Remigius; Sefrin, Pirminus (1952). Hierarchia catholica medii et recentis aevi (in Latin). Vol. V (1667-1730). Patavii: Messagero di S. Antonio.
- Ritzler, Remigius; Sefrin, Pirminus (1958). Hierarchia catholica medii et recentis aevi (in Latin). Vol. 6 (1730-1799). Patavii: Messagero di S. Antonio.
- Ritzler, Remigius; Sefrin, Pirminus (1968). Hierarchia Catholica medii et recentioris aevi (in Latin). Vol. 7 (1800–1846). Monasterii: Libr. Regensburgiana.
- Ritzler, Remigius; Sefrin, Pirminus (1978). Hierarchia catholica Medii et recentioris aevi (in Latin). Vol. 8 (1846–1903). Il Messaggero di S. Antonio.
- Pięta, Zenon (2002). Hierarchia catholica medii et recentioris aevi (in Latin). Vol. 9 (1903–1922). Padua: Messagero di San Antonio. ISBN 978-88-250-1000-8.

=== Studies ===
- Sicily (Italy). Assessorato dei beni culturali e ambientali e della pubblica istruzione; Italy. Soprintendenza per i beni artistici e storici della Sicilia Occidentale (1982). Mostra di documenti e testimonianze figurative della basilica ruggeriana di Cefalù: materiali per la conoscenza storica e il restauro di una cattedrale (in Italian). Palermo: EPOS.
- Backman, Clifford R. (2002). The Decline and Fall of Medieval Sicily: Politics, Religion, and Economy in the Reign of Frederick III, 1296-1337. Cambridge University Press. ISBN 978-0-521-52181-9.
- Cappelletti, Giuseppe (1870). Le chiese d'Italia dalla loro origine sino ai nostri giorni (in Italian). Vol. 21. Venezia: Antonelli. pp. 540–547.
- D'Avino, Vincenzio (1848). Cenni storici sulle chiese arcivescovili, vescovili, e prelatizie (nullius) del regno delle due Sicilie (in Italian). Naples: dalle stampe di Ranucci. pp. 188–197.
- Kamp, Norbert (1975). Kirche und Monarchie im staufischen Königreich Sizilien: I. Prosopographische Grundlegung, Bistumer und Bischofe des Konigreichs 1194–1266: 3. Sizilien München: Wilhelm Fink 1975.
- Kehr, Paul Fridolin (1975). Regesta Pontificum Romanorum. (in Latin). Vol. X: Calabria–Insulae. Turici: Weidmann 1975. pp. 362–367.
- Marzo Ferro, Girolamo di (1860). Stato presente della Chiesa di Sicilia di Girolamo (in Italian). Palermo: Officio Tipografico Lo Bianco. pp. 66–72.
- Pirro, Rocco (1733). Mongitore, Antonino (ed.). Sicilia sacra disquisitionibus et notitiis illustrata (in Latin). Vol. II (third ed.). Panormo: haeredes P. Coppulae. pp. 797–840.
- Misuraca, Giuseppe (1960). Serie dei vescovi di Cefalu con dati cronologici e cenni biografici. (in Italian). Roma 1960.
- Valenziano, Crispino; Valenziano, Maria (1979). La basilica cattedrale de Cefalù nel periodo normanno (in Italian). Palermo: O Theologos.
- Vecchioni, Michele Maria (1769). Diritti della Chiesa Vescovile di Cefalù nel regno di Sicilia, come Chiesa di Regio Padronato, in sul benefizio di S. Lucia di Siracusa [Michele Maria Vecchioni] (in Italian).
