= Bartolomeo Castelli =

Italian Roman Catholic prelate

Most Reverend Bartolomeo Castelli
- Bishop of Mazara del Vallo
- Church: Catholic Church
- Diocese: Diocese of Mazara del Vallo
- In office: 1695–1730
- Predecessor: Franciscus Maria Graffeo
- Successor: Alessandro Caputo

Orders
- Consecration: 30 November 1695 by Pier Matteo Petrucci

Personal details
- Born: 1650 Palermo, Italy
- Died: 5 April 1730 (age 80) Mazara del Vallo, Italy

Bartolomeo Castelli (1650 – 5 April 1730) was a Roman Catholic prelate who served as Bishop of Mazara del Vallo (1695–1730).

== Biography ==
Bartolomeo Castelli was born in 1650 in Palermo, Italy and ordained a priest in the Congregation of Clerics Regular of the Divine Providence. On 28 November 1695, he was appointed by Pope Innocent XII as Bishop of Mazara del Vallo. On 30 November 1695, he was consecrated bishop by Pier Matteo Petrucci, Cardinal-Priest of San Marcello, with Francesco Gori, Bishop of Catanzaro, and Giovanni Battista Visconti Aicardi, Bishop of Novara, as co-consecrators. He served as Bishop of Mazara del Vallo until his death on 5 April 1730.

== Episcopal succession ==
While bishop, he was the principal co-consecrator of:

- Francesco del Giudice, Archbishop of Monreale (1704);
- Giovanni Battista Costantino, Bishop of Castro di Puglia (1718);
- Domenico Antonio Menafra, Bishop of Acerno (1718);
- Gioacchino Francesco Caprini, Bishop of Bitetto (1718);
- Gianmaria Capecelatro, Bishop of Ischia (1718);
- Bernardo Cavalieri, Bishop of San Marco (1718); and
- Giacomo Falconi, Bishop of Caiazzo (1718).

== External links and additional sources ==
- Cheney, David M. "Diocese of Mazara del Vallo". Catholic-Hierarchy.org. (for Chronology of Bishops) ^{[self-published]}
- Chow, Gabriel. "Diocese of Mazara del Vallo (Italy)". GCatholic.org. (for Chronology of Bishops) ^{[self-published]}

Catholic Church titles
Preceded by Franciscus Maria Graffeo	Bishop of Mazara del Vallo; 1695–1730	Succeeded by Alessandro Caputo
