= Bartolomé Sebastián de Aroitia =

Most Reverend Bartolomé Sebastián de Aroitia
- Archbishop of Tarragona
- Church: Catholic Church
- Diocese: Archdiocese of Tarragona
- In office: 1567–1568
- Predecessor: Fernando de Loaces
- Successor: Gaspar Cervantes de Gaeta
- Previous post: Bishop of Patti (1549–1567)

Orders
- Consecration: 24 February 1549 by Girolamo de Terminis

Personal details
- Died: 14 April 1568 Tarragona, Spain

Bartolomé Sebastián de Aroitia (died 14 April 1568) was a Roman Catholic prelate who served as Archbishop of Tarragona (1567–1568) and Bishop of Patti (1549–1567).

== Biography ==
On 9 January 1549, Bartolomé Sebastián de Aroitia was appointed by Pope Paul III as Bishop of Patti. On 24 February 1549, he was ordained bishop by Girolamo de Terminis, Bishop of Mazara del Vallo. On 1 October 1567, he was appointed by Pope Pius V as Archbishop of Tarragona. He served as Archbishop of Tarragona until his death on 14 April 1568.

== External links and additional sources ==
- Cheney, David M. "Diocese of Patti". Catholic-Hierarchy.org. (for Chronology of Bishops) ^{[self-published]}
- Chow, Gabriel. "Diocese of Patti". GCatholic.org. (for Chronology of Bishops) ^{[self-published]}

Catholic Church titles
Preceded by Girolamo Sigismondi	Bishop of Patti; 1549–1567	Succeeded by Antonio Rodríguez de Pazos y Figueroa
Preceded by Fernando de Loaces	Archbishop of Tarragona; 1567–1568	Succeeded by Gaspar Cervantes de Gaeta
