= Francesco del Giudice =

18th-century Roman Catholic cardinal

His Eminence Francesco del Giudice
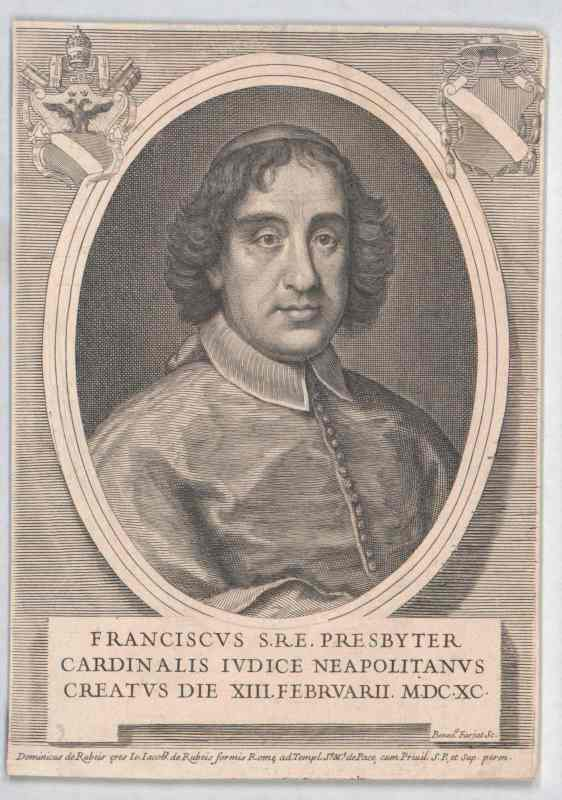
- Francesco del Giudice (1690)
- Church: Catholic Church

Orders
- Consecration: 10 February 1704 by Giuseppe Gasch

Personal details
- Born: 7 December 1647
- Died: 10 October 1725 (age 77)

Francesco del Giudice (7 December 1647 – 10 October 1725) was a Roman Catholic cardinal from 1690 to 1725 who also held a variety of other ecclesiastical and governmental offices.

== Biography ==
Francesco del Giudice was born in Naples on 7 December 1647, the fifth of the fifteen children of Nicolò del Giudice, Prince of Cellamare and his wife Ippolita Palagana.

During his early career in the church, he was Referendary of the Apostolic Signatura; vice-legate of Bologna; governor of Fano; a cleric in the Apostolic Camera; governor of Rome; and Vice-Camerlengo of the Holy Roman Church.

Pope Alexander VIII named him a cardinal priest in the consistory of 13 February 1690, with dispensation for not having received the minor orders. He received the red hat on 10 April 1690, receiving the titulus of Santa Maria del Popolo at that time. He was then named cardinal protector of Spain. He participated in the conclave of 1691 that elected Pope Innocent XII.

He declined a promotion to the see of Salerno in 1696. He managed Spanish affairs in Rome 1698-99. On 30 March 1700, he transferred Santa Maria del Popolo for Santa Sabina as his titulus. He participated in the conclave of 1700 that elected Pope Clement XI. In December 1701, he became Viceroy and Captain General of the Kingdom of Sicily.

On 14 January 1704, Cardinal Giudice was elected Archbishop of Monreale; he was consecrated as a bishop in the Church of the Gesu in Palermo on 10 February 1704 by Giuseppe Gasch, Archbishop of Palermo, assisted by Annibale Termini, Bishop of Siracusa, and by Bartolomeo Castelli, Bishop of Mazzara.

In 1711, Philip V of Spain named Cardinal Giudice Grand Inquisitor of Spain (in which capacity he was the head of the Spanish Inquisition); he was commissioned as Grand Inquisitor on 11 June 1711. He briefly lost royal favor in July 1714, when he issued an edict condemning certain regalist writings into exile at Bayonne, but he was allowed to return to Spain later that year following the death of Maria Luisa of Savoy and the subsequent loss of influence of Marie Anne de La Trémoille, princesse des Ursins.

In 1716, his disagreements with Cardinal Giulio Alberoni ultimately led to his resignation as Grand Inquisitor of Spain.

On 12 July 1717, Cardinal Giudice exchanged his titulus of Santa Sabina for the Suburbicarian See of Palestrina, while retaining his post as Archbishop of Monreale. On 11 August 1719, he became Austria's minister to the Holy See, a post he held until 1720. He also became Secretary of the Roman Inquisition in 1719, a post he held until his death. He exchanged his titular see of Palestrina for the Suburbicarian See of Frascati on 3 March 1721. He participated in the conclave of 1721 that elected Pope Innocent XIII and the conclave of 1724 that elected Pope Benedict XIII. He became Dean of the College of Cardinals on 12 June 1724, exchanging his titular see for the Suburbicarian See of Ostia at that time. He resigned as Archbishop of Monreale on 15 February 1725.

Cardinal Giudice died in Rome on 10 October 1725. His funeral was held at San Marcello al Corso on 12 October 1725, with Pope Benedict XIII in attendance. His remains were then transferred for temporary burial at Santa Maria sopra Minerva before eventually being returned to Naples for permanent burial in Santa Maria del Carmine.

Military offices
Preceded by Juan Manuel María de la Aurora, 8th duke of Escalona	Viceroy of Sicily; 1702 - 1705	Succeeded by Isidoro de la Cueva y Benavides
Catholic Church titles
Preceded by Savo Millini	Cardinal-Priest of Santa Maria del Popolo; 1690–1710	Succeeded by Andrea Santacroce
Preceded by Luis Manuel Fernández de Portocarrero-Bocanegra y Moscoso-Osorio	Cardinal-Priest of Santa Sabina; 1700–1717	Succeeded by Mihály Frigyes Althan
Preceded by Giovanni Roano e Corrionero	Archbishop of Monreale; 1704–1725	Succeeded by Juan Álvaro Cienfuegos Villazón
Preceded by Fabrizio Spada	Cardinal-Bishop of Palestrina; 1717–1721	Succeeded by Francesco Barberini (iuniore)
Preceded by Sebastiano Antonio Tanara	Cardinal-Bishop of Frascati; 1721–1724	Succeeded by Francesco Pignatelli (seniore)
Preceded by Sebastiano Antonio Tanara	Cardinal-Bishop of Ostia e Velletri; 1724–1725	Succeeded by Fabrizio Paolucci
Preceded by Antonio Ibáñez de Riva Herrera	Grand Inquisitor of Spain; 1711—1716	Succeeded by Several Appointed but none serve until Diego de Astorga y Céspedes
