= Francesco Gonzaga (bishop of Mantua) =

Venerable Francesco Gonzaga
- Bishop of Mantua
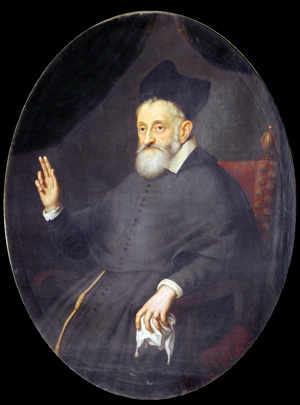
- Church: Roman Catholic Church
- In office: 1593–1620
- Predecessor: Alessandro Andreasi
- Successor: Vincenzo Agnello Suardi
- Previous posts: Apostolic Nuncio to France (1596–1599); Bishop of Cefalù (1587–1593); Bishop of Pavia (1593)

Orders
- Consecration: 15 November 1587 by Alessandro Andreasi

Personal details
- Died: 2 March 1620 Mantua, Italy

Francesco Gonzaga O.F.M. Obs. (died 2 March 1620) was a Roman Catholic prelate who served as Bishop of Mantua (1593–1620), Apostolic Nuncio to France (1596–1599), Bishop of Pavia (1593), and Bishop of Cefalù (1587–1593).

== Early life ==
Annibale Gonzaga was born as the fifth son of Carlo Gonzaga, Marquis of Gazzuolo, Count of San Martino and his wife Emilia Cauzzi Gonzaga, natural daughter of Federico II Gonzaga, Duke of Mantua by his lover Isabella Boschetti. After the death of his father in 1555, Annibale grew up under the care of his grand-uncles Ferrante and Cardinal Ercole Gonzaga.

At the age of eleven, the cardinal sent him to Flanders to the court of Philip II of Spain to be initiated into a military career. Following the king to Spain, he went first to Toledo, and then Madrid where Gonzaga instead matured his religious vocation.

== Friar ==
Despite the opposition of his family, he decided to enter the Order of Friars Minor, taking the name "Francis". He was professed in May 1563. Having completed his studies in Alcalá and been ordained a priest in Toledo in 1570, he was appointed preacher, reader, confessor. The Minister General of the order called him back to Italy where he devoted himself to teaching theology. With the help of his brothers, he built a convent on the family lands in San Martino dall'Argine. In 1577 he was appointed provincial minister of the Veneto.

In 1579, the general chapter of the Order held in Paris appointed him minister general: he wanted to resign, but the apostolic nuncio forced him to accept the office. He prescribed that the litany of the Virgin with the Oremus of the Immaculate Conception be sung every Saturday evening throughout the Order. He devoted himself to drafting new constitutions that would enable the friars to embrace the teachings of the Council of Trent. In eight years of governing he visited friaries in Italy, France, Spain, Flanders, and Germany. He sent missionaries to China, Philippines, and Brazil, dealt with very serious matters at the courts of France, Spain, Portugal. He built a convent in Bologna to house Polish religious who came to Italy to devote themselves to higher studies.

== Bishop ==
On 26 October 1587, Pope Sixtus V appointed Gonzaga Bishop of Cefalù. On 15 November 1587, he was consecrated bishop by Alessandro Andreasi, Bishop of Mantova, with Jacopo Roveglio, Bishop of Feltre, and Matteo Brumani, Titular Bishop of Nicomedia, serving as co-consecrators. There he was engaged in implementing the Tridentine decrees. In 1589 he was principal consecrator of Juan Corrionero as Bishop of Catania.

On 29 January 1593, Pope Clement VIII named him Bishop of Pavia. In February, he assisted at the consecration of Carlo Bescapè as Bishop of Novara.

However, his family wanted him bishop of their own city. On 30 April 1593, he was appointed Bishop of Mantua, where he held six synods during his tenure. As bishop, he was the principal co-consecrator of Jérôme de Langue, Bishop of Couserans (1593) and François Martinengo Bishop of Nice (1600). In 1594 he modified a wing of the episcopal palace to accommodate the seminary. He financed improvements in the church of San Francesco in Mantua and invited Camillus de Lellis to open a convent of his hospitaller friars in Mantua. He paid the debts of prisoners, renovated the facade of the Cattedrale di San Pietro apostolo, and built housing for poor families.

On 10 May 1596, he was named Apostolic Nuncio to France and served in this position until 1599.

He ceded the fief of Ostiano, of which he was marquis, to his nephew Scipione, eldest son of his brother Ferrante, prince of Bozzolo and his wife Isabella Gonzaga.

He served as Bishop of Mantua until his death on 2 March 1620 in Mantua. Bishop Francesco Gonzaga was buried in the cathedral where his tomb was the destination of pilgrimages.

The decree introducing the cause was issued on 2 August 1627, granting him the title of Servant of God. He was declared Venerable, and, on 13 July 1904, the cause for his beatification was opened. The Museo diocesano Francesco Gonzaga in Mantua displays sacred artworks, armor, coins, tapestries, pottery, ancient and contemporary paintings.

== External links and additional sources ==
- Cheney, David M. "Diocese of Cefalù". Catholic-Hierarchy.org. (for Chronology of Bishops) ^{[self-published]}
- Chow, Gabriel. "Diocese of Cefalù (Italy)". GCatholic.org. (for Chronology of Bishops) ^{[self-published]}
- Cheney, David M. "Diocese of Pavia". Catholic-Hierarchy.org. (for Chronology of Bishops) ^{[self-published]}
- Chow, Gabriel. "Diocese of Pavia". GCatholic.org. (for Chronology of Bishops) ^{[self-published]}
- Cheney, David M. "Diocese of Mantova". Catholic-Hierarchy.org. (for Chronology of Bishops) ^{[self-published]}
- Chow, Gabriel. "Diocese of Mantova (Italy)". GCatholic.org. (for Chronology of Bishops) ^{[self-published]}

Catholic Church titles
Preceded by Ottaviano Preconio	Bishop of Cefalù; 1587–1593	Succeeded by Nicolò Stizzia
Preceded by Alessandro Maria Sauli	Bishop of Pavia; 1593	Succeeded by Guglielmo Bastoni
Preceded by Alessandro Andreasi	Bishop of Mantua; 1593–1620	Succeeded by Vincenzo Agnello Suardi
Preceded by Gianfrancesco Morosini	Apostolic Nuncio to France; 1596–1599	Succeeded by Gaspare Silingardi
