= Girolamo de Terminis =

Roman Catholic bishop

Most Reverend Girolamo de Terminis
- Bishop of Mazara del Vallo
- Church: Catholic Church
- Diocese: Diocese of Mazara del Vallo
- In office: 1543–1561
- Predecessor: Giovanni Omodei
- Successor: Giacomo Lomellino del Canto

Personal details
- Died: 27 October 1561 Mazara del Vallo, Italy

Girolamo de Terminis (died 27 October 1561) was a Roman Catholic prelate who served as Bishop of Mazara del Vallo (1543–1561).

== Biography ==
On 6 August 1543, Girolamo de Terminis was appointed by Pope Paul III as Bishop of Mazara del Vallo. He served as Bishop of Mazara del Vallo until his death on 27 October 1561.

While bishop, he was the principal consecrator of Bartolomé Sebastián de Aroitia, Bishop of Patti, and Francisco Orozco de Arce, Archbishop of Palermo.

== External links and additional sources ==
- Cheney, David M. "Diocese of Mazara del Vallo". Catholic-Hierarchy.org. (for Chronology of Bishops) ^{[self-published]}
- Chow, Gabriel. "Diocese of Mazara del Vallo (Italy)". GCatholic.org. (for Chronology of Bishops) ^{[self-published]}

Catholic Church titles
Preceded by Girolamo de Francisco	Bishop of Mazara del Vallo; 1543–1561	Succeeded by Giacomo Lomellino del Canto
