= Matteo da Gimara =

Blessed Matteo da Gimara O.F.M.
- Bishop of Agrigento
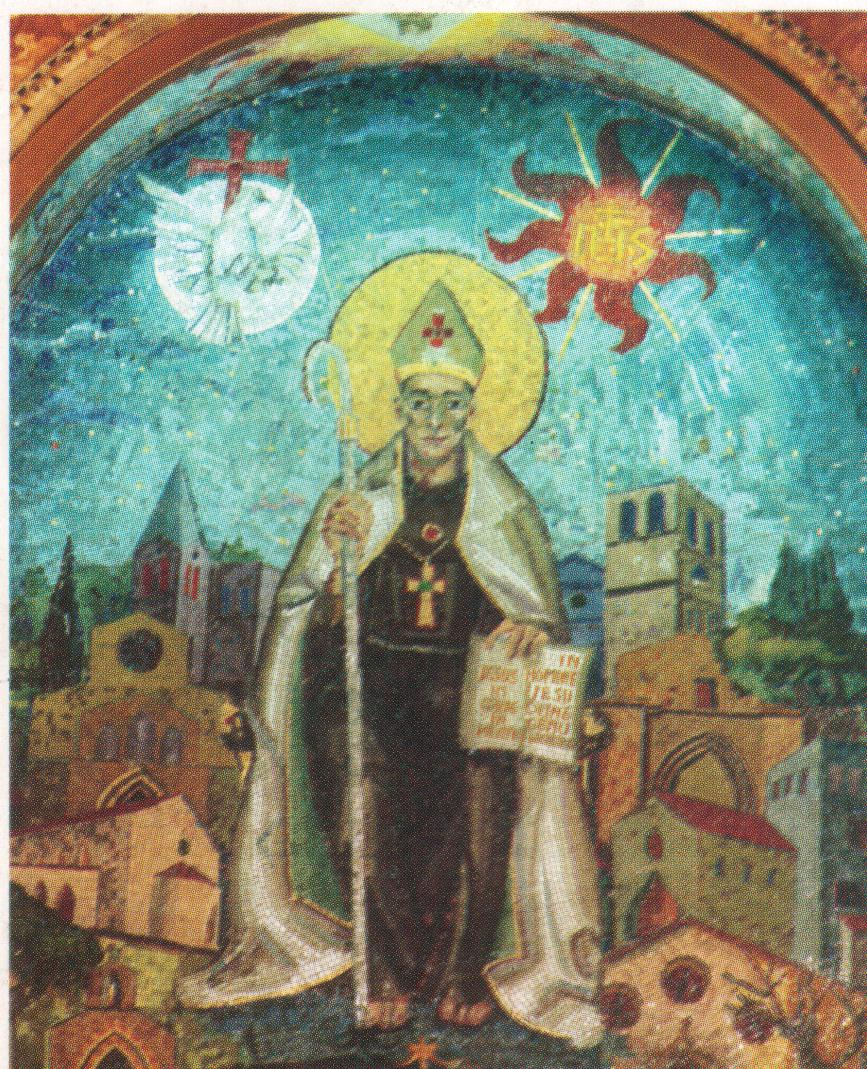
- Mosaic (Alberto Farina) in Santa Maria di Gesù in Palermo.
- Church: Roman Catholic Church
- Diocese: Agrigento
- See: Agrigento
- Appointed: 17 September 1442
- Term ended: 23 July 1445
- Predecessor: Lorenzo da Napoli
- Successor: Antonio Ponticorona

Orders
- Ordination: 1400
- Consecration: 30 June 1443 by Giovanni Rosa

Personal details
- Born: Matteo Guimerà c. 1376; Agrigento, Kingdom of Sicily
- Died: 7 January 1450 (aged 33); Palermo, Kingdom of Sicily

Sainthood
- Feast day: 7 January
- Venerated in: Roman Catholic Church
- Beatified: 22 February 1767; Saint Peter's Basilica, Papal States by Pope Clement XIII
- Attributes: Franciscan habit Episcopal attire Pastoral staff
- Patronage: Archdiocese of Agrigento

Matteo da Gimara, OFM (also known as Matthew of Agrigento; c. 1376 – 7 January 1450) was an Italian Catholic prelate and a professed member of the Order of Friars Minor. He served as the Bishop of Agrigento from 17 September 1442 until his resignation in mid-1445. He was forced to resign due to clerical opposition to his tenure and rumors spread against him forced this resignation.

Matteo was noted for his concern towards the poor as well as for his preaching abilities; he was known to have preached in various Italian cities and had support from Pope Eugene IV who was a benefactor. He also preached across Spain on several occasions being close to the monarch (he is alleged to have Spanish origins) before returning to the Italian peninsula to preach and assume his episcopal duties.

He was honored for his saintliness in life and death, which later led to Pope Clement XIII approving his beatification on 22 February 1767.

== Life ==
Matteo Guimerà was born in Agrigento sometime in 1376 and is said to be descended from a Spanish line. It has been debated that his name is Matteo de Zizilia due to an entrance record into the Order of Friars Minor at Bologna dated 30 July 1394 while other hagiographers have suggested that he was named after his grandfather with the surname Sciascia; others suggest Limbeni is his surname.

He was sent to Bologna for his theological studies and later to Barcelona in Spain where he was ordained as a priest in 1400.

He joined the Order of Friars Minor either in 1391 or 1392 at the San Francesco d'Assisi convent before making his religious profession in 1394. It was after his ordination that he was tasked with preaching in Tarragona and then served as a novice master from 1405 until 1416 (he returned home in 1417). Per King Alfonso V he returned home in the hopes of meeting Saint Bernardino da Siena; the two were said to have met at the order's General Chapter in Mantua in 1418 to which Matteo encouraged and began aiding Bernardino in his Franciscan Observance movement. He also served as the order's provincial vicar from 1425 until 1427 and then as the order's commissioner general for the Sicilian Province from 1432 until 1440. Pope Martin V allowed him in 1425 to establish three convents for the Franciscans and he and Saint Giovanni da Capistrano defended their friend Bernardino before the pope when Bernardino was accused of being a heretic in relation to his devotion to the Sacred Name; Bernardino was acquitted of all the charges leveled against him. This accusation was voiced at the end of Lent in Viterbo in 1426 which prompted Matteo and Giovanni to rush to Rome to plead their case before the pope. Matteo also founded convents in Valencia and Barcelona during the time he spent in Spain from 1427 until 1428 but returned to his homeland where he founded a convent in Siracusa in 1429 and the convent associated with the church of Santa Maria di Gesù at Caltagirone later in 1432. He returned to Spain in 1430 when Queen Maria of Aragon asked him to help make peace between her husband John II (the King of Castile) and his brother. King Alfonso V of Aragon held him in such high esteem that he helped to secure Matteo for a nomination to an Italian bishopric; Pope Eugene IV appointed him in a papal bull on 17 September 1442 as the Bishop of Agrigento. This came after he preached for Lent in 1428 in Valencia and left for the Italian peninsula in April 1430 after concluding his preaching in Tarragona.

Matteo was consecrated to the episcopate on 30 June 1443 and set to work to reform clerical standards and to aid the poor in his diocese. His consecration was postponed for several months due to his own opposition to the appointment; he accepted at the pope's insistence and in obedience to him. His care for the poor led some disgruntled clerics to claim that he squandered ecclesial goods for his own benefit. He in fact renounced all ecclesial proceeds to the poor but kept what was needed for him and for the well-being of the diocesan staff. But the disgruntled clerics who opposed him sought to remove him from the diocese and claimed he was engaging in carnal relations with a woman in order to force the pope to take action. He was tried in a papal court but was found innocent; Eugene IV restored his bishopric to him (the pope was a consistent benefactor for Matteo) but the bishop resigned his see even though the allegations were disproved. It is said that Bernardino's counsel also helped him in his decision to resign. The pope provided him with a pension following his resignation as a consolation.

Matteo died following a brief illness in Palermo on 7 January 1455, and was interred in the Santa Maria di Gesù church.

== Beatification ==
Pope Clement XIII beatified Matteo on 22 February 1767.

Catholic Church titles
| Preceded by Lorenzo da Napoli | Bishop of Agrigento; 17 September 1442 – 1445 | Succeeded by Antonio Ponticorona |
