= Domenico Xarth =

Most Reverend Domenico Xarth
- Bishop of Agrigento
- Church: Catholic Church
- Diocese: Diocese of Agrigento
- In office: 1452–1471
- Predecessor: Antonio Ponticorona
- Successor: Giovanni de Cardellis

Personal details
- Died: 1471 Rome, Italy

Domenico Xarth, O. Cist. (died 1471) was a Roman Catholic prelate who served as Bishop of Agrigento (1452–1471).

== Biography ==
Domenico Xarth was ordained a priest in the Cistercian Order. On 10 January 1452, he was appointed by Pope Nicholas V as Bishop of Agrigento. He served as Bishop of Agrigento until his death in 1471 in Rome.

While bishop, he was the principal co-consecrator of Dalmazio Gabrielli, Bishop of Siracusa.

== External links and additional sources ==
- Cheney, David M. "Archdiocese of Agrigento". Catholic-Hierarchy.org. (for Chronology of Bishops)^{[self-published]}
- Chow, Gabriel. "Metropolitan Archdiocese of Agrigento (Italy)". GCatholic.org. (for Chronology of Bishops) ^{[self-published]}

Catholic Church titles
Preceded by Antonio Ponticorona	Bishop of Agrigento; 1452–1471	Succeeded by Giovanni de Cardellis
