= Manuel Quero Turillo =

Most Reverend Manuel Quero Turillo
- Bishop of Cefalù
- Church: Catholic Church
- Diocese: Diocese of Cefalù
- In office: 1596–1605
- Predecessor: Nicolò Stizzia
- Successor: Martino Mira

Orders
- Consecration: 30 May 1597 by Giulio Antonio Santorio

Personal details
- Born: 1554 Jaen, Spain
- Died: 2 September 1605 (aged 50–51) Cefalù, Italy

Manuel Quero Turillo (1554 – 2 September 1605) was a Roman Catholic prelate who served as Bishop of Cefalù (1596–1605).

== Biography ==
Manuel Quero Turillo was born in Jaen, Spain in 1554. On 18 December 1596, he was appointed during the papacy of Pope Clement VIII as Bishop of Cefalù. On 30 May 1597, he was consecrated bishop by Giulio Antonio Santorio, Cardinal-Priest of Santa Maria in Trastevere. He served as Bishop of Cefalù until his death on 2 September 1605.

== External links and additional sources ==
- Cheney, David M. "Diocese of Cefalù". Catholic-Hierarchy.org. (for Chronology of Bishops) ^{[self-published]}
- Chow, Gabriel. "Diocese of Cefalù (Italy)". GCatholic.org. (for Chronology of Bishops) ^{[self-published]}

Catholic Church titles
| Preceded by Nicolò Stizzia | Bishop of Cefalù; 1596–1605 | Succeeded by Martino Mira |
