= Giovanni Gatto =

Italian Roman Catholic bishop (died 1484)

Most Reverend Giovanni Gatto
- Bishop of Cefalù
- Church: Catholic Church
- Diocese: Diocese of Cefalù
- In office: 1479–1484
- Predecessor: Bernardo Margarit
- Successor: Francesco de Noya

Personal details
- Died: 1484

Giovanni Gatto (died 1484) was a Roman Catholic prelate who served as Bishop of Catania (1475–1479) and Bishop of Cefalù (1472–1475 and 1479–1484).

== Biography ==
On 1 Jun 1472, Giovanni Gatto was appointed during the papacy of Pope Sixtus IV as Bishop of Cefalù. On 18 Aug 1475, he was appointed during the papacy of Pope Sixtus IV as Bishop of Catania. On 8 Feb 1479, he was again appointed during the papacy of Pope Sixtus IV as Bishop of Cefalù. He served as Bishop of Cefalù until his death in 1484.

== External links and additional sources ==
- Cheney, David M. "Diocese of Cefalù". Catholic-Hierarchy.org. (for Chronology of Bishops) ^{[self-published]}
- Chow, Gabriel. "Diocese of Cefalù (Italy)". GCatholic.org. (for Chronology of Bishops) ^{[self-published]}
- Cheney, David M. "Archdiocese of Catania". Catholic-Hierarchy.org. (for Chronology of Bishops) ^{[self-published]}
- Chow, Gabriel. "Metropolitan Archdiocese of Catania". GCatholic.org. (for Chronology of Bishops) ^{[self-published]}

Catholic Church titles
Preceded by Luca de Sarzana	Bishop of Cefalù (first term); 1472–1475	Succeeded by Bernardo Margarit
Preceded by Francesco de Campulo	Bishop of Catania; 1475–1479	Succeeded by Bernardo Margarit
Preceded by Bernardo Margarit	Bishop of Cefalù (2nd term); 1479–1484	Succeeded by Francesco de Noya
