= Bernardo Margarit =

15th-century Roman Catholic bishop

Most Reverend Bernardo Margarit
- Bishop of Catania
- Church: Catholic Church
- Diocese: Archdiocese of Catania
- In office: 1479–1486
- Predecessor: Giovanni Gatto
- Successor: Alfonso Carrillo de Albornoz
- Previous post: Bishop-elect of Cefalù (1475–1479)

Orders
- Consecration: 3 Nov 1479 by Dalmazio Gabrielli

Personal details
- Died: 1486

Bernardo Margarit, O.S.B. (died 1486) was a Roman Catholic prelate who served as Bishop of Catania (1479–1486) and Bishop of Cefalù (1475–1479).

== Biography ==
Bernardo Margarit was ordained a priest in the Order of Saint Benedict. On 18 Aug 1475, he was appointed during the papacy of Pope Sixtus IV as Bishop of Cefalù. On 8 Feb 1479, he was appointed during the papacy of Pope Sixtus IV as Bishop of Catania. On 3 Nov 1479, he was consecrated bishop by Dalmazio Gabrielli, Bishop of Siracusa. He served as Bishop of Catania until his death in 1486.

== External links and additional sources ==
- Cheney, David M. "Archdiocese of Catania". Catholic-Hierarchy.org. (for Chronology of Bishops) ^{[self-published]}
- Chow, Gabriel. "Metropolitan Archdiocese of Catania (Italy)". GCatholic.org. (for Chronology of Bishops) ^{[self-published]}
- Cheney, David M. "Diocese of Cefalù". Catholic-Hierarchy.org. (for Chronology of Bishops) ^{[self-published]}
- Chow, Gabriel. "Diocese of Cefalù (Italy)". GCatholic.org. (for Chronology of Bishops) ^{[self-published]}

Catholic Church titles
Preceded by Giovanni Gatto	Bishop-elect of Cefalù; 1475–1479	Succeeded by Giovanni Gatto
Preceded by Giovanni Gatto	Bishop of Catania; 1479–1486	Succeeded by Alfonso Carrillo de Albornoz
