= Antonio Ponticorona =

Italian Roman Catholic bishop

Most Reverend Antonio Ponticorona
- Bishop of Agrigento
- Church: Catholic Church
- Diocese: Diocese of Agrigento
- In office: 1445–1451
- Predecessor: Matteo da Gimara
- Successor: Domenico Xarth
- Previous post: Bishop of Cefalu (1422-1445)

Personal details
- Died: 1451 Agrigento, Italy

Antonio Ponticorona was a Roman Catholic prelate who served as Bishop of Agrigento (1445–1451) and Bishop of Cefalu (1422–1445).

== Biography ==
Antonio Ponticorona was ordained a priest in the Order of Preachers. In 1442, he was appointed by Pope Eugene IV as Bishop of Cefalu. On 23 July 1445, he was appointed by Pope Eugene IV as Bishop of Agrigento. He served as Bishop of Agrigento until his death in 1451.

== External links and additional sources ==
- Cheney, David M. "Diocese of Cefalù". Catholic-Hierarchy.org. (for Chronology of Bishops) ^{[self-published]}
- Chow, Gabriel. "Diocese of Cefalù (Italy)". GCatholic.org. (for Chronology of Bishops) ^{[self-published]}
- Cheney, David M. "Archdiocese of Agrigento". Catholic-Hierarchy.org. (for Chronology of Bishops) ^{[self-published]}
- Chow, Gabriel. "Metropolitan Archdiocese of Agrigento (Italy)". GCatholic.org. (for Chronology of Bishops) ^{[self-published]}

Catholic Church titles
Preceded by	Bishop of Cefalu; 1422–1445	Succeeded by Luca de Sarzana
Preceded by Matteo da Gimara	Bishop of Agrigento; 1445-1451	Succeeded by Domenico Xarth
