= Giovanni Villamarino =

Roman Catholic prelate (died 1525)

Most Reverend Giovanni Villamarino
- Bishop of Mazara del Vallo
- Church: Catholic Church
- Diocese: Diocese of Mazara del Vallo
- In office: 1503–1525
- Successor: Agostino de Francisco

Personal details
- Died: 1525 Mazara del Vallo, Italy

Giovanni Villamarino (died 1525) was a Roman Catholic prelate who served as Bishop of Mazara del Vallo (1503–1525).

In 1503, Giovanni Villamarino was appointed by Pope Alexander VI as Bishop of Mazara del Vallo. He served as Bishop of Mazara del Vallo until his death in 1525.

== External links and additional sources ==
- Cheney, David M. "Diocese of Mazara del Vallo". Catholic-Hierarchy.org. (for Chronology of Bishops) ^{[self-published]}
- Chow, Gabriel. "Diocese of Mazara del Vallo (Italy)". GCatholic.org. (for Chronology of Bishops) ^{[self-published]}

Catholic Church titles
Preceded by	Bishop of Mazara del Vallo; 1503–1525	Succeeded by Agostino de Francisco
