= Giovanni Omodei =

Most Reverend Giovanni Omodei
- Bishop of Mazara del Vallo
- Church: Catholic Church
- Diocese: Diocese of Mazara del Vallo
- In office: 1530–1542
- Predecessor: Girolamo de Francisco
- Successor: Girolamo de Terminis

Personal details
- Died: 1 February 1542 Mazara del Vallo, Italy

Giovanni Omodei (died 1 February 1542) was a Roman Catholic prelate who served as Bishop of Mazara del Vallo (1530–1542).

== Biography ==
On 14 December 1530, Giovanni Omodei was appointed by Pope Clement VII as Bishop of Mazara del Vallo. He served as Bishop of Mazara del Vallo until his death on 1 February 1542.

== External links and additional sources ==
- Cheney, David M. "Diocese of Mazara del Vallo". Catholic-Hierarchy.org. (for Chronology of Bishops) ^{[self-published]}
- Chow, Gabriel. "Diocese of Mazara del Vallo (Italy)". GCatholic.org. (for Chronology of Bishops) ^{[self-published]}

Catholic Church titles
Preceded by Girolamo de Francisco	Bishop of Mazara del Vallo; 1530–1542	Succeeded by Girolamo de Terminis
