= Emanuele Catarinicchia =

Italian Roman Catholic bishop (1926–2024)

His Excellency Emanuele Catarinicchia
- Bishop Emeritus of Mazara del Vallo
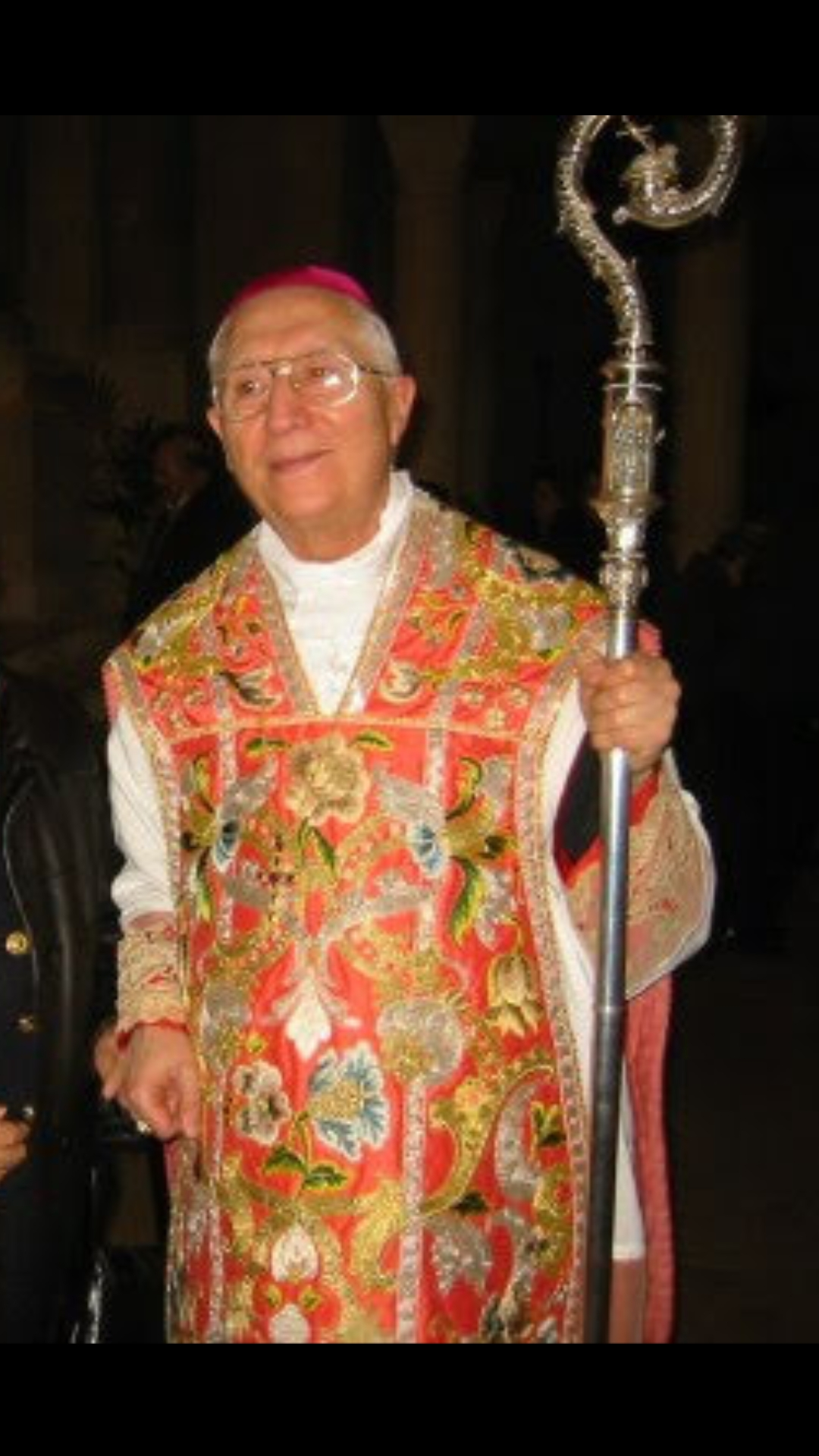
- Metropolis: Palermo
- Appointed: 7 December 1987
- Term ended: 15 November 2002
- Predecessor: Costantino Trapani
- Successor: Calogero La Piana
- Previous post: Bishop of Cefalù (1978–1987)

Orders
- Ordination: 2 April 1949
- Consecration: 17 December 1978 by Sebastiano Baggio

Personal details
- Born: 12 July 1926 Partinico, Sicily, Italy
- Died: 27 January 2024 (aged 97) Mazara del Vallo, Sicily, Italy
- Motto: Super omnia charitas

Emanuele Catarinicchia (12 July 1926 – 26 January 2024) was an Italian prelate of the Roman Catholic Church.

Born in Partinico, Sicily, Catarinicchia was ordained to the priesthood in 1949. He was appointed bishop of Cefalù in 1978, serving until 1987, when he became bishop of Mazara del Vallo. He retired in 2002.

Catarinicchia died on 26 January 2024, at the age of 97.

Catholic Church titles
Preceded by Costantino Trapani	Bishop of Mazara del Vallo; 1987–2002	Succeeded by Calogero La Piana
Preceded by Salvatore Cassisa	Bishop of Cefalù; 1978–1987	Succeeded by Rosario Mazzola
