= Luca de Sarzana =

15th-century Roman Catholic bishop

Most Reverend Luca de Sarzana
- Bishop of Cefalù
- Church: Catholic Church
- Diocese: Diocese of Cefalù
- In office: 1445–1471
- Predecessor: Antonio Ponticorona
- Successor: Giovanni Gatto

Luca de Sarzana, O.F.M. (died 1471) was a Roman Catholic prelate who served as Bishop of Cefalù (1445–1471).

== Biography ==
Luca de Sarzana was ordained a priest in the Order of Friars Minor. On 23 Jul 1445, he was appointed during the papacy of Pope Eugene IV as Bishop of Cefalù. He served as Bishop of Cefalù until his death in 1471.

== External links and additional sources ==
- Cheney, David M. "Diocese of Cefalù". Catholic-Hierarchy.org. (for Chronology of Bishops) ^{[self-published]}
- Chow, Gabriel. "Diocese of Cefalù (Italy)". GCatholic.org. (for Chronology of Bishops) ^{[self-published]}

Catholic Church titles
Preceded by Antonio Ponticorona	Bishop of Cefalù; 1445–1471	Succeeded by Giovanni Gatto
