= Rosario Mazzola =

Italian Roman Catholic prelate (1924–2018)

- Diocese of Cefalù
- Church: Roman Catholic Church
- Diocese: Cefalù
- In office: 1988 – 2000
- Predecessor: Emanuele Catarinicchia
- Successor: Francesco Sgalambro
- Previous post(s): Auxiliary bishop of Palermo (1982–1988)

Orders
- Ordination: 16 July 1950 by Ernesto Ruffini
- Consecration: 4 September 1982 by Salvatore Pappalardo

Personal details
- Born: 19 September 1924; Palermo, Italy
- Died: 24 December 2018 (aged 94); Cefalù, Italy

Rosario Mazzola (19 September 1924 – 24 December 2018) was an Italian prelate of the Roman Catholic Church who served as bishop of Cefalù from 1988 to 2000.

== Life ==
Mazzola studied at the seminary of Palermo. He was ordained a priest on 16 July 1950, by Ernesto Ruffini, archbishop of Palermo and future cardinal. After he worked as a parson, Mazzola was appointed auxiliary bishop of Palermo in June 1982.

He was consecrated on 4 September 1982 by Cardinal Salvatore Pappalardo. On 23 July 1988, Pope John Paul II appointed him bishop of Cefalù. In March 1995, he said that the Mafia activities in Sicily are a 'disgrace'. Mazzola became bishop emeritus on 18 March 2000.
