= Giovanni Rosa =

Roman Catholic prelate

Most Reverend Giovanni Rosa
- Bishop of Mazara del Vallo
- Church: Catholic Church
- Diocese: Diocese of Mazara del Vallo
- In office: 1415–1448
- Successor: Basilios Bessarion

Personal details
- Died: 1448 Mazara del Vallo, Italy

Giovanni Rosa (died 1448) was a Roman Catholic prelate who served as Bishop of Mazara del Vallo (1415–1448).

== Biography ==
Giovanni Rosa was ordained a priest in the Order of Friars Minor. In 1415, he was appointed by Pope Gregory XII as Bishop of Mazara del Vallo. He served as Bishop of Mazara del Vallo until his death in 1448.

While bishop, he was the principal consecrator of Matteo da Gimara, Bishop of Agrigento.

== External links and additional sources ==
- Cheney, David M. "Diocese of Mazara del Vallo". Catholic-Hierarchy.org. (for Chronology of Bishops) ^{[self-published]}
- Chow, Gabriel. "Diocese of Mazara del Vallo (Italy)". GCatholic.org. (for Chronology of Bishops) ^{[self-published]}

Catholic Church titles
Preceded by	Bishop of Mazara del Vallo; 1415–1448	Succeeded by Basilios Bessarion
