= Ottaviano Preconio (bishop of Cefalù) =

Most Reverend Ottaviano Preconio
- Bishop of Cefalù
- Church: Catholic Church
- In office: 1578–1587
- Predecessor: Rodrigo de Vadillo
- Successor: Francesco Gonzaga

Personal details
- Born: Castroreale, Italy
- Died: 11 April 1587 Milazzo, Italy

Ottaviano Preconio (died 1587) was a Roman Catholic prelate who served as Bishop of Cefalù (1578–1587).

== Biography ==
On 11 August 1578, Ottaviano Preconio was appointed during the papacy of Pope Gregory XIII as Bishop of Cefalù. He served as Bishop of Cefalù until his death on 11 April 1587.

== External links and additional sources ==
- Cheney, David M. "Diocese of Cefalù". Catholic-Hierarchy.org. (for Chronology of Bishops) ^{[self-published]}
- Chow, Gabriel. "Diocese of Cefalù (Italy)". GCatholic.org. (for Chronology of Bishops) ^{[self-published]}

Catholic Church titles
Preceded by Rodrigo de Vadillo	Bishop of Cefalù; 1578–1587	Succeeded by Francesco Gonzaga
