= Santa Maria di Gesù, Caltagirone =

Baroque Roman Catholic church

Coordinates: 37.22385°N 14.51844°E

Santa Maria di Gesù is a Roman Catholic parish church located in Caltagirone in the region of Sicily, Italy. There is also a former Jesuit church del Gesù in town.

== History and description ==
A church at the site was built at the beginning of the 16th century through the efforts of the blessed Matteo d'Agrigento of the Franciscan order (Frati Minori Osservanti). Adjacent to the church is the former monastery with a frescoed courtyard. The church was damaged by the 1693 Sicily earthquake, leading to a reconstruction with a new bell-tower, whose dome is decorated with colorful maiolica tiles. The monastery and church were suppressed in the late 19th century; but the monks were allowed to return in 1939.

The interior was frescoed by Bernardino Bongiovanni depicting various Franciscan saints. One of the lateral altars has a Madonna della Catena with child Jesus (1538) by Antonello Gagini. The main altarpiece depicts St Francis granting rules of a monastic order to St Clair (1847) by Francesco Vaccaro. Another altarpiece depicts a Nativity painted by Antonio Balistreri. Inside the church are buried a number of Franciscan priests claimed to be venerable.
