= Damian Mogavero =

American entrepreneur

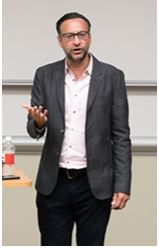
- Mogavero at Cornell University in 2019
- Education: La Salle University (B.S.), Harvard Business School (M.B.A.)
- Occupation: Hospitality Tech Entrepreneur
- Known for: Tech Entrepreneur, Founder of Avero
- Spouse: Whitney Noelle Mogavero
- Website: www.damianmogavero.com

Damian Mogavero is an American entrepreneur who is the founder of the software company, Avero, and its CEO from 1999 to 2016.

== Career ==
In 1999, Mogavero created the hospitality software Avero. Danny Meyer of Union Square Hospitality Group and Tom Colicchio of Crafted Hospitality were among the first users of Avero.

By 2017, Avero was aggregating $24 billion in food and beverage data for over 10,000 restaurants in 70 countries and was used by companies such as Four Seasons Hotels & Resorts, Caesars Entertainment, Carnival Cruise Line, Union Square Hospitality Group, SBE Entertainment Group, and celebrity chefs, including Wolfgang Puck, Tom Colicchio, Guy Fieri, and Giada de Laurentiis. In 2017, Mogavero stepped down as CEO of Avero to start the consulting and investment firm DM Ventures.

In 2023, Mogavero became a Venture Partner at Emerging Fund.

Mogavero has been named "Data-Dining King" by Bloomberg and "right-brain foodie with left-brain MBA" by Fast Company.

== Books ==
Mogavero authored the book The Underground Culinary Tour: How the New Metrics of Today's Top Restaurants are Transforming How America Eats, that was published by Crown Publishing Group. The Underground Culinary Tour was an Amazon best seller in the Food and Wine; and Enterprise Application categories.

The Underground Culinary Tour coined the industry term "New Guard Restaurateur," which defines restaurant operators who are embracing data and adapting to trends of the new foodie generation. The Underground Culinary Tour chronicles the hospitality industry's 25-hour "Underground Culinary Tour" that educates top restaurant executives by using New York City as a restaurant laboratory to showcase emerging trends. The Underground Culinary Tour was featured three times by CBS This Morning.

== Non-profit and humanitarian work ==
Mogavero is a long-time supporter of world hunger initiatives, including Share Our Strength. As an advocate for higher education, Mogavero provided his software, Avero, to universities to allow college students to learn data and analytics. Mogavero is a co-founder of Refoodee, a non-profit organization that empowers refugees through the economic empowerment of the hospitality industry.

Refoodee partnered with the United Nations High Commissioner for Refugees. Together Refoodee and the UNHCR launched the Refoodee Flight, a speciality line of Counter Culture Coffee to spotlight the intersection of coffee production and forced displacement. On June 20, 2019, the Refoodee Flight launched at the United Nations Headquarters in celebration of World Refugee Day. Funds raised went to training and placing refugee candidates with barista positions throughout the United States.

== Recognition ==
- 2015 - Innovator of the Year, Cornell University School of Hotel Administration
- 2013 - Dean's Distinguished Lecture Series, Cornell University School of Hotel Administration
- 2002 - America's Entrepreneur Award, Harvard Business School
