= Alessandro Caputo =

Italian bishop

Alessandro Caputo was Bishop of Mazara from 21 May 1731 – 24 Feb 1741.

Born in Catania in 1672, Caputo was a master of theology and had a doctorate in theology (Catania, 1715). He had been Provincial of the Carmelite Province of Sicily, and Prior of the convent in Catania. He had been Titular Bishop of Thagaste (1728–1731), and was consecrated in Rome on 21 November 1728 by Pope Benedict XIII. He was transferred to the diocese of Mazara on 21 May 1731. He died on 24 February 1741.
