= Girolamo de Francisco =

Most Reverend Girolamo de Francisco
- Bishop of Mazara del Vallo
- Church: Catholic Church
- Diocese: Diocese of Mazara del Vallo
- In office: 1526–1530
- Predecessor: Agostino de Francisco
- Successor: Giovanni Omodei

Personal details
- Died: 1530 Mazara del Vallo, Italy

Girolamo de Francisco (died 1530) was a Roman Catholic prelate who served as Bishop of Mazara del Vallo (1526–1530).

== Biography ==
On 12 December 1526, Girolamo de Francisco was appointed by Pope Clement VII as Bishop of Mazara del Vallo. He served as Bishop of Mazara del Vallo until his death in 1530.

== See also ==
- Catholic Church in Italy

== External links and additional sources ==
- Cheney, David M. "Diocese of Mazara del Vallo". Catholic-Hierarchy.org. (for Chronology of Bishops) ^{[self-published]}
- Chow, Gabriel. "Diocese of Mazara del Vallo (Italy)". GCatholic.org. (for Chronology of Bishops) ^{[self-published]}

Catholic Church titles
Preceded by Agostino de Francisco	Bishop of Mazara del Vallo; 1526–1530	Succeeded by Giovanni Omodei
