= Nicolò Stizzia =

Roman Catholic prelate

Most Reverend Nicolò Stizzia
- Bishop of Cefalù
- Church: Catholic Church
- Diocese: Diocese of Cefalù
- In office: 1594–1596
- Predecessor: Francesco Gonzaga (bishop)
- Successor: Manuel Quero Turillo

Orders
- Consecration: 30 May 1594 by Giulio Antonio Santorio

Personal details
- Born: 1542
- Died: 17 February 1596 (age 54) Cefalù, Sicily

Nicolò Stizzia (1542 – 17 February 1596) was a Roman Catholic prelate who served as Bishop of Cefalù (1594–1596).

== Biography ==
Nicolò Stizzia was born in 1542 and ordained a priest in 1570. On 23 May 1594, he was appointed during the papacy of Pope Clement VIII as Bishop of Cefalù. On 30 May 1594, he was consecrated bishop by Giulio Antonio Santorio, Cardinal-Priest of San Bartolomeo all'Isola with Flaminio Filonardi, Bishop of Aquino, and Leonard Abel, Titular Bishop of Sidon, serving as co-consecrators. He served as Bishop of Cefalù until his death on 17 February 1596.

== External links and additional sources ==
- Cheney, David M. "Diocese of Cefalù". Catholic-Hierarchy.org. (for Chronology of Bishops) ^{[self-published]}
- Chow, Gabriel. "Diocese of Cefalù (Italy)". GCatholic.org. (for Chronology of Bishops) ^{[self-published]}

Catholic Church titles
Preceded by Francesco Gonzaga (bishop)	Bishop of Cefalù; 1594–1596	Succeeded by Manuel Quero Turillo
