= Domenico Mogavero =

Bishop of Mazara del Vallo

- Bishop Emeritus of Mazara del Vallo
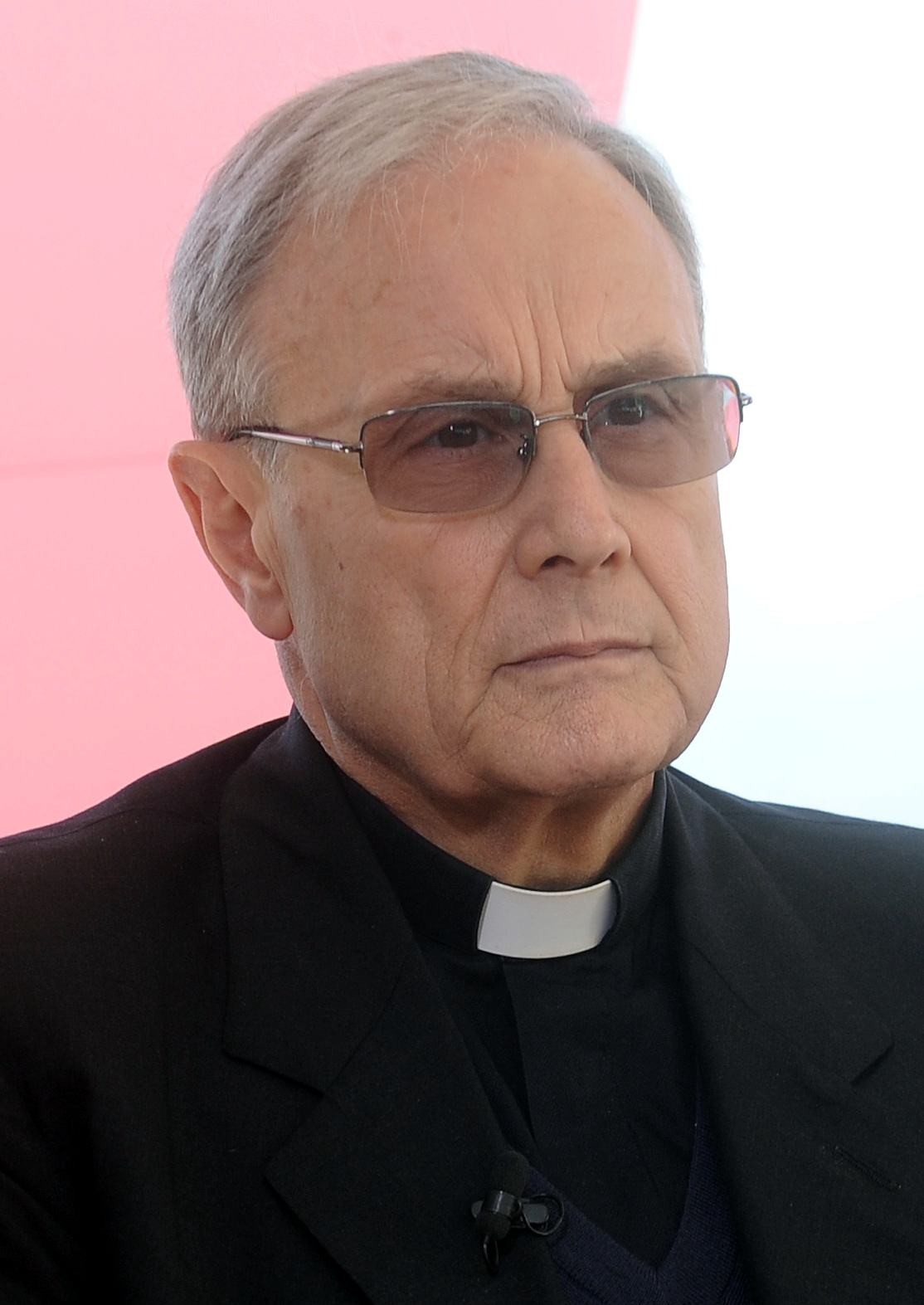
- Church: Catholic Church
- Diocese: Diocese of Mazara del Vallo
- In office: 22 February 2007 – 29 July 2022
- Predecessor: Calogero La Piana
- Successor: Angelo Giurdanella

Orders
- Ordination: 12 July 1970 by Francesco Carpino
- Consecration: 24 March 2007 by Camillo Ruini

Personal details
- Born: 31 March 1947 (age 79) Castelbuono, Province of Palermo, Italy
- Coat of arms

Domenico Mogavero (born 31 March 1947, in Castelbuono) is Bishop of Mazara del Vallo and former member of the Conferencia Episcopale Siciliana.

== External links and additional sources ==
- Cheney, David M. "Diocese of Mazara del Vallo". Catholic-Hierarchy.org. (for Chronology of Bishops)^{self-published}
- Chow, Gabriel. "Diocese of Mazara del Vallo". GCatholic.org. (for Chronology of Bishops)^{self-published}
