= Diocese of Mazara del Vallo =

Roman Catholic diocese in Italy

Coordinates: 37.6500°N 12.5833°E

Diocese of Mazara del Vallo Dioecesis Mazariensis

Catholic
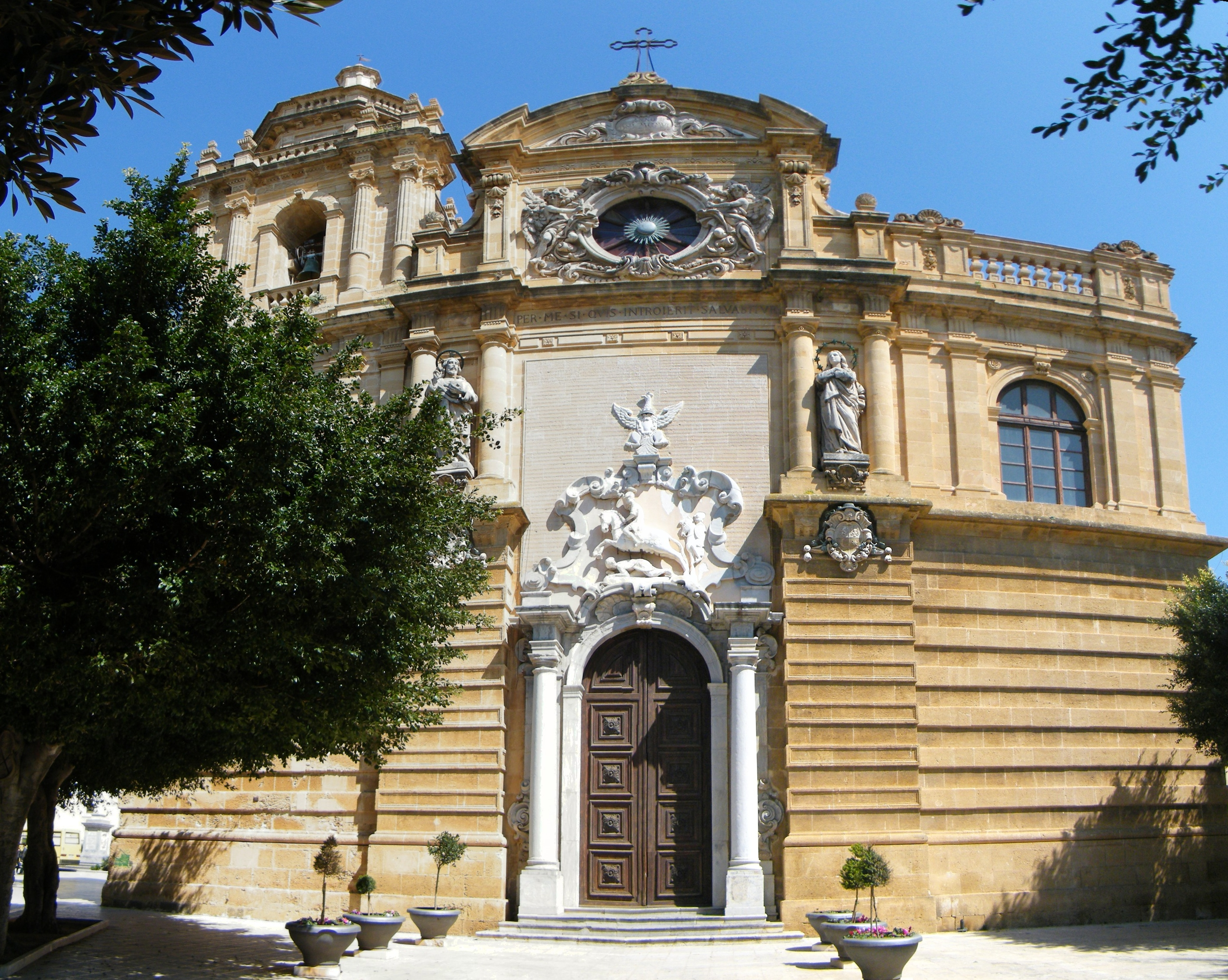
- Mazara del Vallo Cathedral

Location
- Country: Italy
- Ecclesiastical province: Palermo

Statistics
- Area: 1,374 km^{2} (531 sq mi)
- Population: Total; Catholics: (as of 2023); 226,000 (est.) ▼; 214,000 (est.) ▲ (94.7%)
- Parishes: 67

Information
- Denomination: Catholic Church
- Rite: Roman Rite
- Established: 1093 (932–933 years ago)
- Cathedral: Basilica Cattedrale di SS. Salvatore
- Secular priests: 62 (diocesan) ▼30 (Religious Orders); 4 Permanent Deacons

Current leadership
- Pope: Leo XIV
- Bishop: Angelo Giurdanella
- Bishops emeritus: Domenico Mogavero

Map
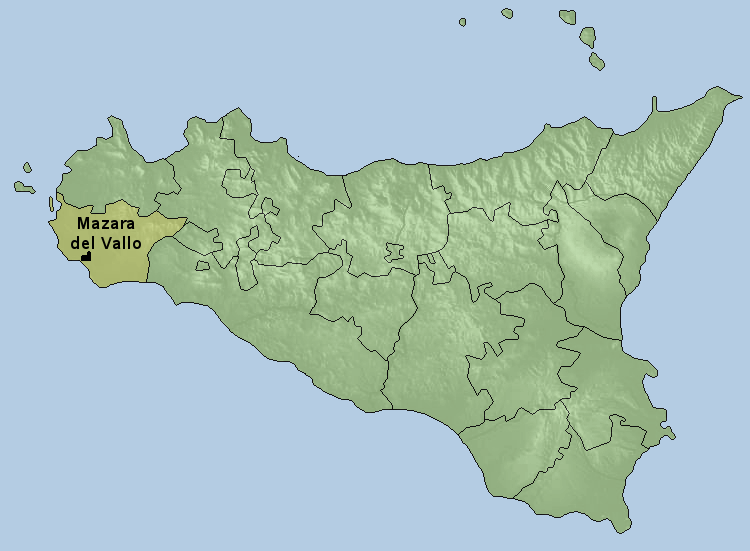

Website
- www.diocesimazara.it

The Diocese of Mazara del Vallo (Latin: Dioecesis Mazariensis) is a Latin church diocese of the Catholic Church in far western Sicily. Founded in 1093, it is a suffragan of the Archdiocese of Palermo.

== History ==
The area had previously been part of the Diocese of Lilybaeum (Marsala), a port 27 mi (22.0 km) to the northwest, which was captured by the Muslims in 827. At that time it was a suffragan diocese of the Patriarchate of Constantinople, having earlier been dependent on Rome. Under the Normans, Lilybaeum was not reestablished.

In the struggle of the Saracens against the Normans for the possession of Sicily, Mazara was hotly contested, especially in 1075 when Roger I of Sicily emerged victorious. In 1077, the port city of Trapani was captured. Mazara was captured in 1092, and, with the permission of Pope Urban II, a new diocese of Mazara del Vallo was established at the seaport of Mazara (Mazzara) in 1093.

=== Norman Sicily ===
In 1093, Count Roger granted the territories forming the diocese of Mazara to Bishop Stephen of Rouen, his consanguineus (blood relative), and his successors. The territory of Trapani was included in the territory Mazara del Vallo. Roger was insistent that the dioceses he established should belong to the Roman rite, and that the bishops should be consecrated by the pope. He applied the same policy with the foundation of the diocese of Squillace in Calabria in 1096.

The privileges of Mazara were confirmed by Pope Paschal II in the bull "Omnipotentis Dei nutu" of 15 October 1100.

In 1130, at the request of King Roger II of Sicily, the antipope Anacletus II granted the archbishops of Palermo the right to consecrate three bishops of Sicily: Syracuse, Agrigento and Mazara. This made the three dioceses suffragans of the metropolitan of Palermo. This arrangement was confirmed by Pope Adrian IV in 1156.

In 1176, a part of the diocesan territory was transferred to the abbey of Monreale.

The diocese was obligated to pay an annual pension to the Chapter of Santa Maria Maggiore in Rome.

It is noted that in 1101, Basilian monks were in possession of the monastery of Santa Maria de Alto and at Santi Niccolo e Giovanni. Benedictine monks had a monastery at San Michele Archangelo. There was also a Basilian monastery of San Michele, founded c. 1127 by George of Antioch, the admiral of King Roger II. The monastery of Sainte-Marie de l'Abita was founded in 1383, by Enrico Vintimille, the lord if Abita.

==== Cathedral ====
The cathedral, founded by Count Roger and Bishop Stefano, was later embellished by Bishop Tustino (1157–1180). Dedicated to the Holy Savior, it had a Chapter composed of four dignities and eighteen Canons. The dignities are: the Cantor, the Archdeacon, the Dean, and the Treasurer. the right of appointment of the Cantor belongs to the Pope. If a vacancy in one of the other dignities or a canonicate occurs between January and June, the right of appointment belongs to the Pope, and if the vacancy occurs between July and December, to the Bishop .

Bishop Carlos Impellizzeri (1650 – 1654) and Bishop Giovanni Lonzano had the bell tower and most of the façade constructed.

A fair was held annually on 6 August, in honor of the Savior, the dedicant of the cathedral.

=== Post-Tridentine events ===
A diocesan synod was held under Bishop Antonio Lombardo (1573 – 1579) in 1575.

Bishop Bernardo Gascó (1579–1586) founded the diocesan clerical seminary in accordance with the decrees of the Council of Trent in 1580. He held a diocesan synod in 1584.

Cardinal Giovanni Domenico Spinola, bishop of Mazara (1636–1646), visited the diocese twice, in 1640 and in 1646. He held a diocesan synod in 1641, and published its decrees in a volume of 291 pages. Bishop Franciscus Maria Graffeo (1685–1695) held a diocesan synod in 1694. Bishop Bartolomeo Castelli (1695–1730) presided over a diocesan synod on 15 July 1698, and published the revised and amplified diocesan statutes.

In 1670, the city of Mazara had approximately 9,000 inhabitants. In 1742, the town of Mazara had approximately 6000 citizens.

On 8 June 1844, the diocese of Trapani was established by Pope Gregory XVI, with the bull "Ut Animarum Pastores." Six towns and their territories were withdrawn from the northern part of the diocese of Mazara.

By a decree of the Consistorial Congregation of the Roman Curia, and with the approval of Pope Pius XII, on 15 September 1950 the communities of Alcamo, Calatafimi, Castellammare del Golfo, and the territory of Borgo Fazio were removed from the diocese of Mazara and transferred to the diocese of Trapani. At the same time, the island of Pantelleria (Cossura) was transferred from Trapani to Mazara.

By virtue of the Apostolic Letter, "Ianua Coeli", of 10 March 1962, Pope John XXIII officially recognized the Virgin Mary (under the title of Madonna del Paradiso), and Saints Vito, Modesto, and Crescentia as the patrons of the diocese of Mazara.

== Bishops of Mazara del Vallo ==
=== to 1300 ===
- (1093 – ca. 1125) : Stephanus de Ferro
- Ubertus
- (by 1157 – 1180) : Tustinus (Tristanus)
- Benvenutus, O.Min.
- (attested 1182, 1183) : Matthaeus
- (attested 1188) : Laurentius
- (attested 1193) : Ignotus
- (attested 1198, 1199) : Ignotus (attested 1198, 1199)
- (attested 1200, 1201) : Petrus
- (attested 1208) : Ignotus
- Julianus (attested 1226)
- (attested 10 October 1239) : Ignotus
- [ (attested 1259) : Quintilius ]
- (18 January 1256 – 10 August 1270) : Nicolaus, O.Cist.
- (attested 1260) : Lucas
- (1270) : Benvenutus, O.Cist.
- (1271 – 6 April 1283) : Ioannes Fulvius (Fulcus)
- (c. 1288) : Guilelmus

=== from 1300 to 1500 ===
- (1305 – 1313) : Gothofredus Roncioni
- (1313 – 1327) : Peregrinus de Pactis O.P.
- (1327 – 1330) : Petrus Roganus, O.P.
- (1330 – 1334) : Ferrarius de Abella, O.P.
- (14 June 1335 – 1342) : Hugo de Pistoria, O.P.
- (20 November 1342 – 1347) : Bernardus
- (22 June 1347 – 1349) : Raimundus
- (1349 – 1355) : Guilelmus Monstrius
- (24 April 1347 – 1361) : Gregory, O.S.B.
- (1362 – 1363) : Francesco da Catania
- (1363 – 1383) : Rogerius de Platea, O.F.M.
- (1386? – 1388?) : Franciscus de Regno, O.Min. (Roman Obedience)
- (1388 – ) : Anastasius (Avignon Obedience)
- (1388 – ) : Franciscus, O.P. (Roman Obedience)
- (1391 – 1414) : Franciscus Vitalis
- (1415 – 1448) : Giovanni Rosa, O.F.M.
- (14 June 1415 – ?) : Petrus, O.Min. (Avignon-Perpignan Obedience)
- (1449 – 1458) : Basilios Bessarion, O.S.B.M., in commendam
- (1458 – 1467) : Joannes Burgius
- (1467 – 1469) : Paolo Visconti, O.Carm.
- (1469 – 1485) : Giovanni de Monteaperto
- (1486 – 1503) : Joannes Castrinot

=== from 1500 to 1700 ===
- (1503 – 1525) : Giovanni Villamarino

(1525 – 1526) : Agostino de Francisco, Administrator

- (1526 – 1530) : Girolamo de Francisco
- (1530 – 1542) : Giovanni Omodei
- (1543 – 1561) : Girolamo de Terminis
- (1562 – 1571) : Giacomo Lomellino del Canto
- (1571 – 1573) : Juan Beltrán de Guevara
- (1573 – 1579) : Antonio Lombardo (bishop)
- (30 Mar 1579 – 1586) : Bernardo Gascó
- (1589 – 1602) :Luciano Rosso (de Rubeis)
- (1604 – 1605) : Giovanni de Gante(s)
- (5 Dec 1605 – 5 Aug 1626 Died) : Marco La Cava
- (23 Sep 1630 – 9 Jul 1635) : Francisco Sánchez Villanueva y Vega
- 1636 – 1646) : Cardinal Giovanni Domenico Spinola
- (7 Oct 1647 – 21 Mar 1650) : Diego Requeséns
- (1650 – 1654) : Carlos Impellizzeri
- (1656 – 1669) : Juan Lozano, O.E.S.A.
- (30 Jun 1670 – 9 May 1678) : Giuseppe Cigala (Cicala), C.R.
- (1681 – 1683) : Carlo Riggio
- (1685 – 1695) : Franciscus Maria Graffeo, O.F.M. Conv.

=== since 1700 ===
- (1695 – 1730) : Bartolomeo Castelli, C.R.
- (1731 – 1741) : Alessandro Caputo, O. Carm.
- (1742 – 1758) : Giuseppe Stella
- (1759 – 1765 Resigned) :Girolamo Palermo, C.R.
- (1766 – 1771) : Michele Scavo
- (1772 – 1791) : Ugone Papé di Valdina
- (3 Dec 1792 – 21 Dec 1811) : Orazio della Torre
- (1816 – 1829) : Emmanuele Custo
- (17 Dec 1832 – 4 Jul 1842) :Luigi Scalabrini, O. Carm.
- (20 Jan 1845 – 1857) : Antonio Salomone
- (1858 – 1882) : Carmelo Valenti, C.SS.R.
- (22 Sep 1882 – 5 Mar 1900) : Antonio Maria Saeli, C.SS.R.
- (15 Jun 1900 – 1 Apr 1903 Resigned) : Gaetano Quattrocchi
- (22 Jun 1903 – 21 Jun 1933) : Nicola Maria Audino
- (18 Sep 1933 – 8 Aug 1949 Resigned) : Salvatore Ballo Guercio
- (5 Jul 1950 – 8 Oct 1963) : Gioacchino Di Leo
- (26 Dec 1963 – 21 Mar 1977 Retired) : Giuseppe Mancuso
- (21 Mar 1977 – 7 Dec 1987 Retired) : Costantino Trapani, O.F.M.
- (7 Dec 1987 – 15 Nov 2002 Retired) : Emanuele Catarinicchia
- (15 Nov 2002 – 2006) : Calogero La Piana, S.D.B.
- (22 Feb 2007 – 2022 Retired) : Domenico Mogavero
- (29 Jul 2022 – ) : Angelo Giurdanella

== Books ==
=== Reference Works ===
- Eubel, Conradus, ed. (1913). Hierarchia catholica (in Latin). Vol. 1 (Tomus 1) (second ed.). Münster: Libreria Regensbergiana. pp. 181–182.. Archived.
- Eubel, Conradus, ed. (1914). Hierarchia catholica (in Latin). Vol. 2 (Tomus 2) (second ed.). Münster: Libreria Regensbergiana. p. 125.. Archived.
- Eubel, Conradus, ed. (1923). Hierarchia catholica (in Latin). Vol. 3 (Tomus 3) (second ed.). Münster: Libreria Regensbergiana. p. 163.. Archived.
- Gams, Pius Bonifatius (1873). Series episcoporum Ecclesiae catholicae: quotquot innotuerunt a beato Petro apostolo. Ratisbon: Typis et Sumptibus Georgii Josephi Manz. p. 953. (Use with caution; obsolete)
- Gauchat, Patritius (Patrice) (1935). Hierarchia catholica (in Latin). Vol. 4 (IV) (1592-1667). Münster: Libraria Regensbergiana.
- Ritzler, Remigius; Sefrin, Pirminus (1952). Hierarchia catholica medii et recentis aevi (in Latin). Vol. 5 (V) (1667-1730). Patavii: Messagero di S. Antonio.
- Ritzler, Remigius; Sefrin, Pirminus (1958). Hierarchia catholica medii et recentis aevi (in Latin). Vol. 6 (1730-1799). Patavii: Messagero di S. Antonio.
- Ritzler, Remigius; Sefrin, Pirminus (1968). Hierarchia Catholica medii et recentioris aevi (in Latin). Vol. 7 (1800–1846). Monasterii: Libr. Regensburgiana.
- Ritzler, Remigius; Sefrin, Pirminus (1978). Hierarchia catholica Medii et recentioris aevi (in Latin). Vol. 8 (1846–1903). Il Messaggero di S. Antonio.
- Pięta, Zenon (2002). Hierarchia catholica medii et recentioris aevi (in Latin). Vol. 9 (1903–1922). Padua: Messagero di San Antonio. ISBN 978-88-250-1000-8.

=== Studies ===
- Backman, Clifford R. (2002). The Decline and Fall of Medieval Sicily: Politics, Religion, and Economy in the Reign of Frederick III, 1296-1337. Cambridge University Press. ISBN 978-0-521-52181-9.
- Cappelletti, Giuseppe (1870). Le chiese d'Italia dalla loro origine sino ai nostri giorni (in Italian). Vol. vigesimoprimo (21). Venezia: Antonelli. pp. 547–556.
- D'Avino, Vincenzio (1848). Cenni storici sulle chiese arcivescovili, vescovili, e prelatizie (nullius) del regno delle due Sicilie (in Italian). Naples: dalle stampe di Ranucci. pp. 321–325.. [article by Bartolomeo Castelli]
- Kehr, Paul Fridolin (1975). Italia Pontificia (in Latin) Vol. X: Calabria—Insulae. ed. D. Girgensohn. (Berlin: Weidmann 1975).
- Lanzoni, Francesco (1927). Le diocesi d'Italia dalle origini al principio del secolo VII (an. 604) (in Italian). Rome: Biblioteca Apostolica Vaticana. pp. 644-650.
- Pirro, Rocco (1733). Mongitore, Antonino (ed.). Sicilia sacra disquisitionibus et notitiis illustrata (in Latin). Vol. Tomus secundus (II) (third ed.). Panormo: haeredes P. Coppulae. pp. 841–899.
- Savagnone, F. Guglielmo (1912). "Concili e sinodi di Sicilia," (in Italian), in: Atti della reale Accademia di scienze, lettere e belle arti di Palermo terza serie, Vol. 9. Palermo: Impresa generale d'Affissione e Publicità, 1912. pp. 3-212 + Appendice.
- Taranto, Diego (1980). "La diocesi di Mazara nel 1430: il Rivelo dei benefici," (in French and Latin), in: Mélanges de l'Ecole française de Rome. Moyen-Age, Temps modernes, vol. 92, n°2 (19800, pp. 511-554.
- Taranto, Diego (1981). "La diocesi di Mazara nel 1430: il rivelo dei benefici. II," (in Italian and Latin), in: Mélanges de l'Ecole française de Rome. Moyen-Age, Temps modernes, vol. 93, n°1. (1981), pp. 189-214.
