= List of Catholic dioceses in Italy =

The following is a list of the Catholic dioceses in Italy. As of May 2017, the Catholic Church in Italy is divided into sixteen ecclesiastical regions. While they are similar to the 20 civil regions of the Italian state, there are some differences. Most ecclesiastical regions are in turn divided into a number of ecclesiastical provinces. The provinces are in turn divided into a number of dioceses. The sovereign state of Vatican City is part of the metropolitan province of Rome. A metropolitan bishop exercises a degree of leadership over a group of dioceses that are loosely subject (suffragan) to the care of the metropolitan see. This list excludes those archdioceses, dioceses and ecclesiastical territories that are immediately subject to the Holy See.

There are 227 sees ('particular churches'), most of which are dioceses led by a bishop. A diocese that is led by an archbishop is known as an archdiocese. There are 40 Metropolitan archdioceses which serve as the seat of an ecclesiastical province. This number includes the Holy See and the Patriarchate of Venice. There are also four archdioceses which are non-metropolitan, having been demoted by papal decree. This brings the number of archbishops in Italy and Vatican City to 44 (i.e. 40 + 4).

All the sees belong to the Latin Church apart from three Eastern Catholic sees of the Italo-Albanian Catholic Church that use the Byzantine Rite in the Albanian language. All sees of the Latin Church use the Roman Rite apart from the Metropolitan Archdiocese of Milan, which mainly uses the Ambrosian Rite.

== Episcopal Conference of Italy ==
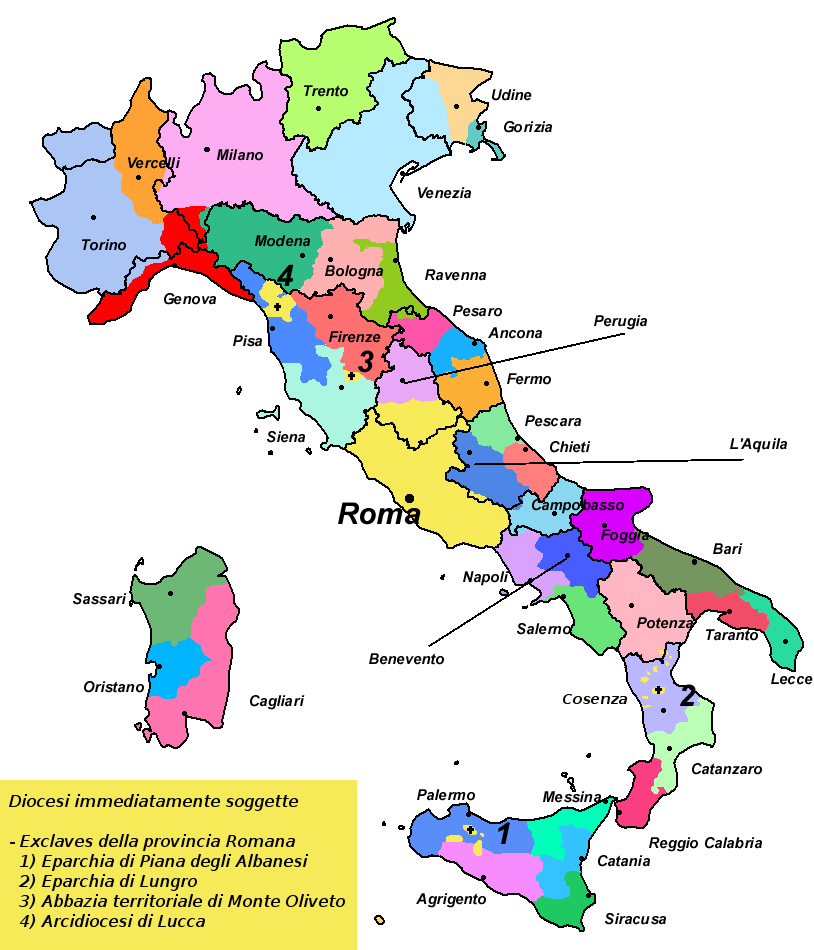
ecclesiastical provinces in Italy (above)/ Ecclesiastical regions (below)

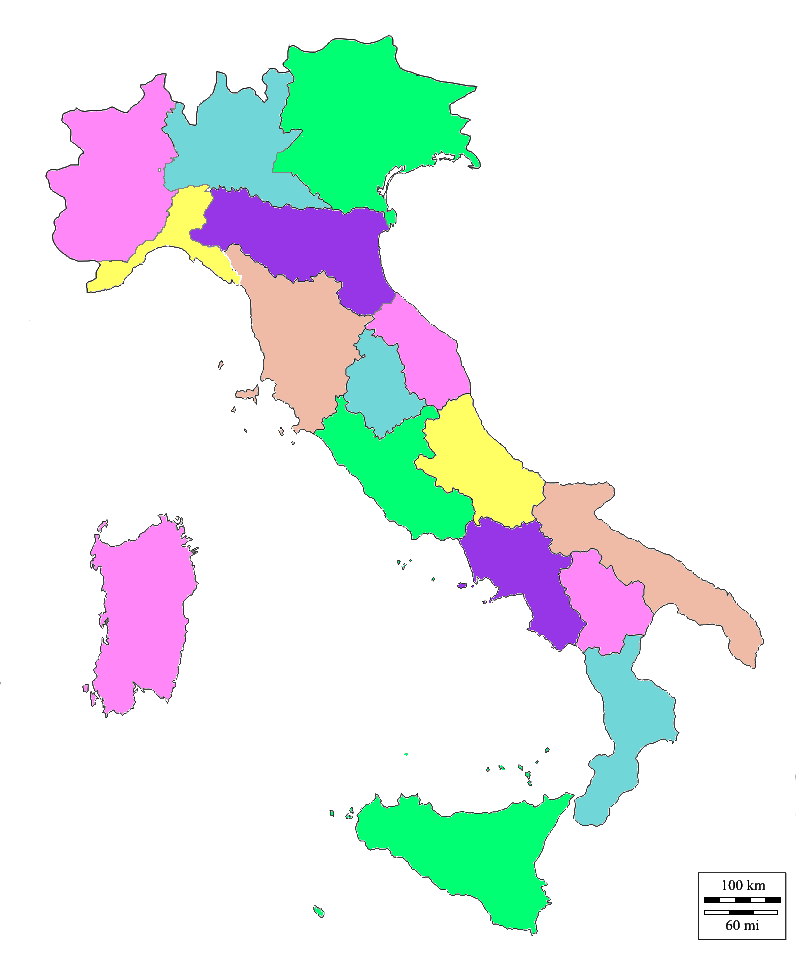

Map Code	Ecclesiastical Region	Ecclesiastical Province
1	Abruzzo-Molise	
1	Abruzzo-Molise	L'Aquila in Abruzzo
1	Abruzzo-Molise	Chieti-Vasto in Abruzzo
1	Abruzzo-Molise	Pescara-Penne in Abruzzo
1	Abruzzo-Molise	Campobasso-Boiano in Molise
2	Basilicata	
2	Basilicata	Potenza-Muro Lucano-Marsico Nuovo
3	Calabria	
3	Calabria	Calabria-Bova
3	Calabria	Catanzaro-Squillace
3	Calabria	Cosenza-Bisignano
4	Campania	
4	Campania	Salerno-Campagna-Acerno
4	Campania	Benevento
4	Campania	Naples
5	Emilia-Romagna	
5	Emilia-Romagna	Bologna
5	Emilia-Romagna	Modena-Nonantola
5	Emilia-Romagna	Ravenna-Cervia
6	Lazio	
6	Lazio	Rome
7	Liguria	
7	Liguria	Genoa
8	Lombardy	
8	Lombardy	Milan
9	Marche	
9	Marche	Ancona-Osimo
9	Marche	Fermo
9	Marche	Pesaro
10	Piedmont	
10	Piedmont	Turin including Aosta Valley
10	Piedmont	Vercelli in Piedmont
11	Puglia	
11	Puglia	Bari-Bitonto
11	Puglia	Foggia-Bovino
11	Puglia	Lecce
11	Puglia	Taranto
12	Sardinia	
12	Sardinia	Cagliari
12	Sardinia	Oristano
12	Sardinia	Sassari
13	Sicily	
13	Sicily	Agrigento
13	Sicily	Catania
13	Sicily	Messina-Lipari
13	Sicily	Palermo
13	Sicily	Syracuse
14	Tuscany	
14	Tuscany	Florence
14	Tuscany	Pisa
14	Tuscany	Siena-Colle di Val d'Elsa-Montalcino
15	Triveneto	
15	Triveneto	Gorizia in Friuli-Venezia Giulia
15	Triveneto	Udine in Friuli-Venezia Giulia
15	Triveneto	Trento in Trentino-Alto Adige/Südtirol
15	Triveneto	Venice in Veneto
16	Umbria	
16	Umbria	Perugia-Città della Pieve

== Exempt ==
The following are immediately Subject to the Holy See, despite not being in the Pope's Ecclesiastical Province of Rome.

- non-Metropolitan Archdiocese of Lucca
- non-Metropolitan Archdiocese of Spoleto-Norcia
- Diocese of Orvieto-Todi
- Diocese of Terni-Narni-Amelia
- Territorial Abbey of Monte Oliveto Maggiore
- Military Ordinariate of Italy
- Personal Prelature of Opus Dei

=== Italo-Albanian Catholic Church ===
(Byzantine Rite, the only non-Latin dioceses in Italy)

- Eparchy of Lungro
- Eparchy of Piana degli Albanesi
- Territorial Abbacy of Santa Maria of Grottaferrata

== Ecclesiastical Region of Abruzzo-Molise ==
The ecclesiastical provinces of L'Aquila, Chieti-Vasto and Pescara-Penne are mainly situated in the civil region of Abruzzo while Campobasso-Boiano is situated in Molise.

=== Ecclesiastical Province of L'Aquila ===
- Archdiocese of L'Aquila
  - Diocese of Avezzano
  - Diocese of Sulmona-Valva

=== Ecclesiastical Province of Chieti-Vasto ===
- Metropolitan Archdiocese of Chieti-Vasto
  - Archdiocese of Lanciano-Ortona

=== Ecclesiastical Province of Pescara-Penne ===
- Archdiocese of Pescara-Penne
  - Diocese of Teramo-Atri

=== Ecclesiastical Province of Campobasso-Boiano ===
- Metropolitan Archdiocese of Campobasso-Boiano
  - Diocese of Isernia-Venafro
  - Diocese of Termoli-Larino
  - Diocese of Trivento

== Ecclesiastical Region of Basilicata ==
=== Ecclesiastical Province of Potenza-Muro Lucano-Marsico Nuovo ===
- Archdiocese of Potenza-Muro Lucano-Marsico Nuovo
  - Archdiocese of Acerenza
  - Archdiocese of Matera-Irsina
  - Diocese of Melfi-Rapolla-Venosa
  - Diocese of Tricarico
  - Diocese of Tursi-Lagonegro

== Ecclesiastical Region of Calabria ==
=== Ecclesiastical Province of Reggio Calabria-Bova ===
- Archdiocese of Reggio Calabria-Bova
  - Diocese of Locri-Gerace
  - Diocese of Mileto-Nicotera-Tropea
  - Diocese of Oppido Mamertina-Palmi

=== Ecclesiastical Province of Catanzaro-Squillace ===
- Metropolitan Archdiocese of Catanzaro-Squillace
  - Archdiocese of Crotone-Santa Severina
  - Diocese of Lamezia Terme

=== Ecclesiastical Province of Cosenza-Bisignano ===
- Metropolitan Archdiocese of Cosenza-Bisignano
  - Archdiocese of Rossano-Cariati
  - Diocese of Cassano all'Jonio
  - Diocese of San Marco Argentano-Scalea

== Ecclesiastical Region of Campania ==
=== Ecclesiastical Province of Salerno-Campagna-Acerno ===
- Metropolitan Archdiocese of Salerno-Campagna-Acerno
  - Archdiocese of Amalfi-Cava de' Tirreni
  - Diocese of Nocera Inferiore-Sarno
  - Diocese of Teggiano-Policastro
  - Diocese of Vallo della Lucania
  - Territorial Abbey of Santissima Trinità di Cava de' Tirreni

=== Ecclesiastical Province of Benevento ===
- Metropolitan Archdiocese of Benevento
  - Archdiocese of Sant'Angelo dei Lombardi-Conza-Nusco-Bisaccia
  - Diocese of Ariano Irpino-Lacedonia
  - Diocese of Avellino
  - Diocese of Cerreto Sannita-Telese-Sant’Agata de’ Goti
  - Territorial Abbey of Montevergine

=== Ecclesiastical Province of Naples ===
- Metropolitan Archdiocese of Naples
  - Archdiocese of Capua
  - Archdiocese of Sorrento-Castellammare di Stabia
  - Diocese of Acerra
  - Diocese of Alife-Caiazzo
  - Diocese of Aversa
  - Diocese of Caserta
  - Diocese of Ischia
  - Diocese of Nola
  - Diocese of Pozzuoli
  - Diocese of Sessa Aurunca
  - Diocese of Teano-Calvi
  - Territorial Prelature of Pompei o Beatissima Vergine Maria del SS.mo Rosario

== Ecclesiastical Region of Emilia-Romagna ==
=== Ecclesiastical Province of Bologna ===
- Metropolitan Archdiocese of Bologna
  - Archdiocese of Ferrara-Comacchio
  - Diocese of Faenza-Modigliana
  - Diocese of Imola

=== Ecclesiastical Province of Modena-Nonantola ===
- Metropolitan Archdiocese of Modena-Nonantola
  - Diocese of Carpi
  - Diocese of Fidenza
  - Diocese of Parma
  - Diocese of Piacenza-Bobbio
  - Diocese of Reggio Emilia-Guastalla

=== Ecclesiastical Province of Ravenna-Cervia ===
- Archdiocese of Ravenna-Cervia
  - Diocese of Cesena-Sarsina
  - Diocese of Forli-Bertinoro
  - Diocese of Rimini
  - Diocese of San Marino-Montefeltro

== Ecclesiastical Region of Lazio ==
=== Ecclesiastical Province of Rome ===
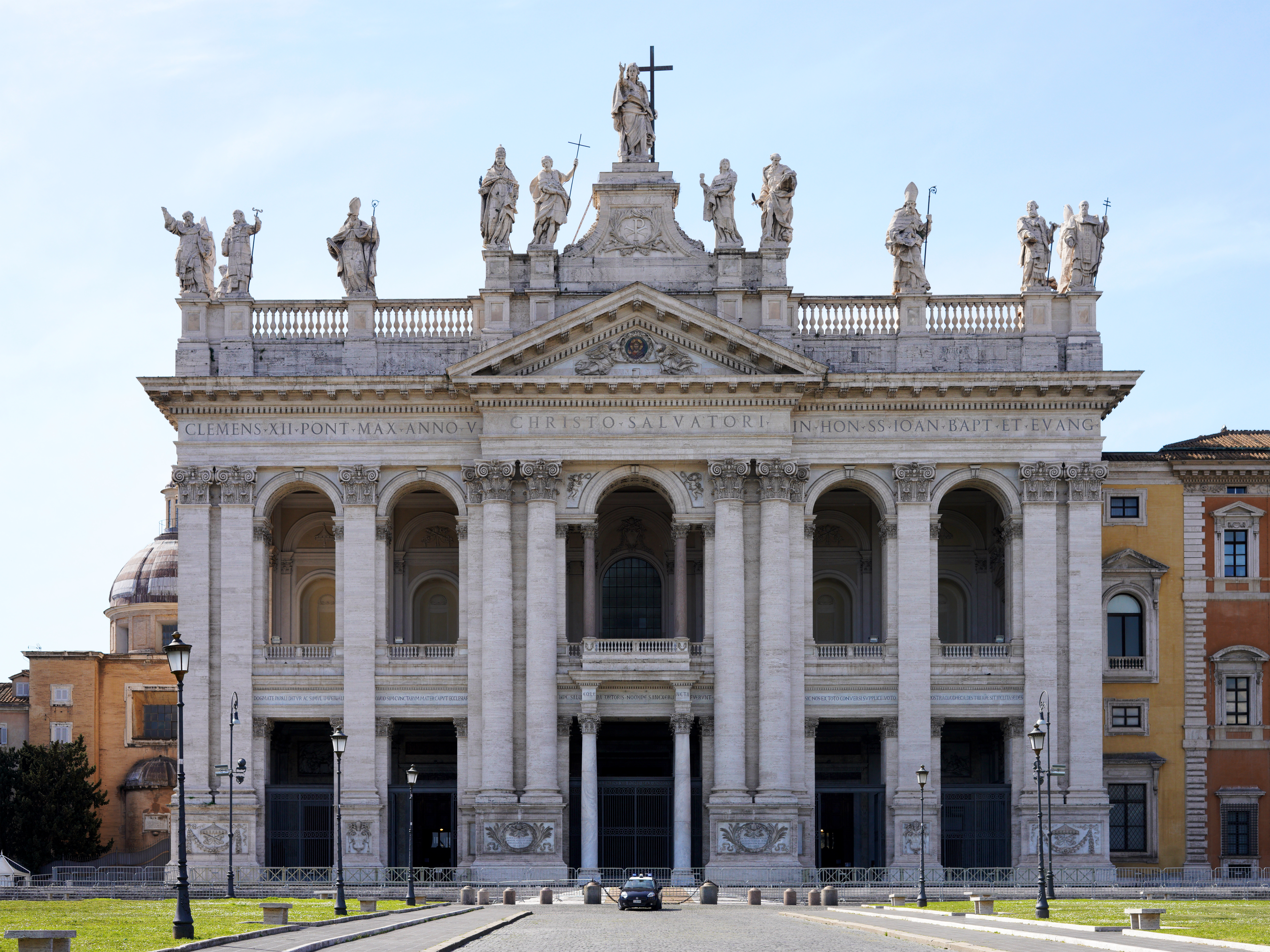
The motherchurch of the Roman Catholic dioceses of Italy is the Archbasilica of St. John Lateran, the cathedral church of the pope.

- Diocese of Rome
  - Suburbicarian See of Albano
  - Suburbicarian See of Frascati
  - Suburbicarian See of Palestrina
  - Suburbicarian See of Porto-Santa Rufina
  - Suburbicarian See of Sabina-Poggio Mirteto
  - Suburbicarian See of Velletri-Segni
  - Archdiocese of Gaeta
  - Diocese of Anagni-Alatri
  - Diocese of Civita Castellana
  - Diocese of Civitavecchia-Tarquinia
  - Diocese of Frosinone-Veroli-Ferentino
  - Diocese of Latina-Terracina-Sezze-Priverno
  - Diocese of Rieti
  - Diocese of Sora-Aquino-Pontecorvo
  - Diocese of Tivoli
  - Diocese of Viterbo
  - Territorial Abbey of Montecassino
  - Territorial Abbey of Subiaco

== Ecclesiastical Region of Liguria ==
=== Ecclesiastical Province of Genoa ===
- Metropolitan Archdiocese of Genoa
  - Diocese of Albenga-Imperia
  - Diocese of Chiavari
  - Diocese of La Spezia-Sarzana-Brugnato
  - Diocese of Savona-Noli
  - Diocese of Tortona
  - Diocese of Ventimiglia-San Remo

== Ecclesiastical Region of Lombardy ==
=== Ecclesiastical Province of Milan ===
- Metropolitan Archdiocese of Milan
  - Diocese of Bergamo
  - Diocese of Brescia
  - Diocese of Como
  - Diocese of Crema
  - Diocese of Cremona
  - Diocese of Lodi
  - Diocese of Mantua
  - Diocese of Pavia
  - Diocese of Vigevano

== Ecclesiastical Region of Marche ==
=== Ecclesiastical Province of Ancona-Osimo ===
- Metropolitan Archdiocese of Ancona-Osimo
  - Diocese of Fabriano-Matelica
  - Diocese of Jesi
  - Diocese of Senigallia
  - Territorial Prelature of Loreto

=== Ecclesiastical Province of Fermo ===
- Metropolitan Archdiocese of Fermo
  - Archdiocese of Camerino-San Severino Marche
  - Diocese of Ascoli Piceno
  - Diocese of Macerata-Tolentino-Recanati-Cingoli-Treia
  - Diocese of San Benedetto del Tronto-Ripatransone-Montalto

=== Ecclesiastical Province of Pesaro ===
- Metropolitan Archdiocese of Pesaro
  - Archdiocese of Urbino-Urbania-Sant'Angelo in Vado
  - Diocese of Fano-Fossombrone-Cagli-Pergola

== Ecclesiastical Region of Piedmont ==
=== Ecclesiastical Province of Turin ===
- Metropolitan Archdiocese of Turin
  - Diocese of Acqui
  - Diocese of Alba Pompeia
  - Diocese of Aosta
  - Diocese of Asti
  - Diocese of Cuneo
  - Diocese of Fossano
  - Diocese of Ivrea
  - Diocese of Mondovi
  - Diocese of Pinerolo
  - Diocese of Saluzzo
  - Diocese of Susa

=== Ecclesiastical Province of Vercelli ===
- Metropolitan Archdiocese of Vercelli
  - Diocese of Alessandria della Paglia
  - Diocese of Biella
  - Diocese of Casale Monferrato
  - Diocese of Novara

== Ecclesiastical Region of Puglia ==
=== Ecclesiastical Province of Bari-Bitonto ===
- Metropolitan Archdiocese of Bari-Bitonto
  - Archdiocese of Trani-Barletta-Bisceglie
  - Diocese of Altamura-Gravina-Acquaviva delle Fonti
  - Diocese of Andria
  - Diocese of Conversano-Monopoli
  - Diocese of Molfetta-Ruvo-Giovinazzo-Terlizzi

=== Ecclesiastical Province of Foggia-Bovino ===
- Metropolitan Archdiocese of Foggia-Bovino
  - Archdiocese of Manfredonia-Vieste-S. Giovanni Rotondo
  - Diocese of Cerignola-Ascoli Satriano
  - Diocese of Lucera-Troia
  - Diocese of San Severo

=== Ecclesiastical Province of Lecce ===
- Metropolitan Archdiocese of Lecce
  - Archdiocese of Brindisi-Ostuni
  - Archdiocese of Otranto
  - Diocese of Nardò-Gallipoli
  - Diocese of Ugento-Santa Maria di Leuca

=== Ecclesiastical Province of Taranto ===
- Metropolitan Archdiocese of Taranto
  - Diocese of Castellaneta
  - Diocese of Oria

== Ecclesiastical Region of Sardinia ==
=== Ecclesiastical Province of Cagliari ===
- Metropolitan Archdiocese of Cagliari
  - Diocese of Iglesias
  - Diocese of Lanusei
  - Diocese of Nuoro

=== Ecclesiastical Province of Oristano ===
- Metropolitan Archdiocese of Oristano
  - Diocese of Ales-Terralba

=== Ecclesiastical Province of Sassari ===
- Metropolitan Archdiocese of Sassari
  - Diocese of Alghero-Bosa
  - Diocese of Ozieri
  - Diocese of Tempio-Ampurias

== Ecclesiastical Region of Sicily ==
=== Ecclesiastical Province of Agrigento ===
- Metropolitan Archdiocese of Agrigento
  - Diocese of Caltanissetta
  - Diocese of Piazza Armerina

=== Ecclesiastical Province of Catania ===
- Metropolitan Archdiocese of Catania
  - Diocese of Acireale
  - Diocese of Caltagirone

=== Ecclesiastical Province of Messina-Lipari-Santa Lucia del Mela ===
- Metropolitan Archdiocese of Messina-Lipari-Santa Lucia del Mela
  - Diocese of Nicosia
  - Diocese of Patti

=== Ecclesiastical Province of Palermo ===
- Metropolitan Archdiocese of Palermo
  - Archdiocese of Monreale
  - Diocese of Cefalu
  - Diocese of Mazara del Vallo
  - Diocese of Trapani

=== Ecclesiastical Province of Siracusa (Syracuse) ===
- Metropolitan Archdiocese of Siracusa
  - Diocese of Noto
  - Diocese of Ragusa

== Ecclesiastical Region of Tuscany ==
=== Ecclesiastical Province of Firenze (Florence) ===
- Metropolitan Archdiocese of Florence
  - Diocese of Arezzo-Cortona-Sansepolcro
  - Diocese of Fiesole
  - Diocese of Pistoia
  - Diocese of Prato
  - Diocese of San Miniato

=== Ecclesiastical Province of Pisa ===
- Archdiocese of Pisa
  - Diocese of Livorno
  - Diocese of Massa Carrara-Pontremoli
  - Diocese of Pescia
  - Diocese of Volterra

=== Ecclesiastical Province of Siena-Colle di Val d'Elsa-Montalcino ===
- Metropolitan Archdiocese of Siena-Colle di Val d'Elsa-Montalcino
  - Diocese of Grosseto
  - Diocese of Massa Marittima-Piombino
  - Diocese of Montepulciano-Chiusi-Pienza
  - Diocese of Pitigliano-Sovana-Orbetello

== Ecclesiastical Region of Triveneto ==
In the ecclesiastical region of Triveneto, there are two ecclesiastical provinces that are situated in the civil region of Friuli-Venezia Giulia (Gorizia and Udine); one province that is mainly situated in the civil region of Trentino-Alto Adige/Südtirol (Trento); and one province that is mainly situated in the civil region of Veneto (Venice).

=== Ecclesiastical Province of Gorizia ===
- Metropolitan Archdiocese of Gorizia
  - Diocese of Trieste

=== Ecclesiastical Province of Udine ===
- Metropolitan Archdiocese of Udine

=== Ecclesiastical Province of Trento ===
- Metropolitan Archdiocese of Trento
  - Diocese of Bolzano-Brixen

=== Ecclesiastical Province of Venice ===
- Patriarchate (& Metropolitan Archdiocese) of Venice
  - Diocese of Adria-Rovigo
  - Diocese of Belluno-Feltre
  - Diocese of Chioggia
  - Diocese of Concordia-Pordenone
  - Diocese of Padua
  - Diocese of Treviso
  - Diocese of Verona
  - Diocese of Vicenza
  - Diocese of Vittorio Veneto

== Ecclesiastical Region of Umbria ==
=== Ecclesiastical Province of Perugia-Città della Pieve ===
- Metropolitan Archdiocese of Perugia-Città della Pieve
  - Diocese of Assisi-Nocera Umbra-Gualdo Tadino
  - Diocese of Città di Castello
  - Diocese of Foligno
  - Diocese of Gubbio

== Titular Prelatures ==
- Titular Archiepiscopal Sees :
  - Metropolitan : Patriarchate of Aquileia, Patriarchate of Grado
  - other : Archdiocese of Gradisca
- Titular Episcopal Sees (158): Acquapendente, Æca, Agropoli, Alessano, Altino, Amiterno, Anglona, Anzio, Aquaviva, Arna, Arpi, Asolo, Atella, Aveia, Bagnoregio, Belcastro, Bettona, Bevagna, Biccari, Bisarcio, Bitetto, Blanda, Blera, Bolsena, Bomarzo, Brescello, Buxentum, Campli, Canne, Canosa, Caorle, Capo della Foresta, Capri, Carini, Carinola, Carmeiano, Castello, Castro, Castro di Puglia, Castro di Sardegna, Caudium, Celano, Cerenzia, Cerveteri, Città Ducale, Civitanova, Civitate, Claterna, Cuma, Dolia, Dragonara, Eclano, Egnazia Appula, Equilio, Eraclea, Erdonia, Faleri, Falerone, Ferento, Fidene, Fiorentino, Fondi, Forconio, Fordongianus, Forlimpopoli, Formia, Foro Flaminio, Frigento, Gabi, Galazia in Campania, Gallese, Galtellì, Grumentum, Guardialfiera, Isola, Labico, Lavello, Lentini, Lesina, Lettere, Lilibeo, Lorium, Luni, Malamocco, Martana, Martirano, Massa Lubrense, Minervino Murge, Minori, Minturno, Miseno, Montecorvino, Montefiascone, Montemarano, Monterano, Monteverde, Mottola, Nepi, Nomento, Numana, Oderzo, Ofena, Orte, Ostra, Otricoli, Ottana, Passo Corese, Pausula, Pesto, Plestia, Ploaghe, Polignano, Populonia, Potenza Picena, Ravello, Roselle, Sabiona, Sala Consilina, Salpi, San Leone, Santa Giusta, Satriano, Scala, Sepino, Sorres, Spello, Strongoli, Subaugusta, Suelli, Sulci, Sutri, Taormina, Tauriano, Termini Imerese, Tharros, Thurio, Tindari, Torcello, Tortiboli, Tre Taverne, Treba, Trevi, Trevi nel Lazio, Trevico, Tricala, Troina, Tronto, Tuscania, Umbriatico, Urbisaglia, Velia, Vescovìo, Vibo Valentia, Vico Equense, Voghenza, Volturno, Vulturara, Zuglio
- Titular Abbacies (?nullius) (all 10 united to current dioceses) : Farfa, Fontevivo, Nonantola, Pomposa, San Colombano, San Martino al Monte Cimino, San Michele Arcangelo di Montescaglioso, San Salvatore Maggiore, Santa Maria di Polsi, Santissimo Salvatore

== Gallery of Archdioceses ==
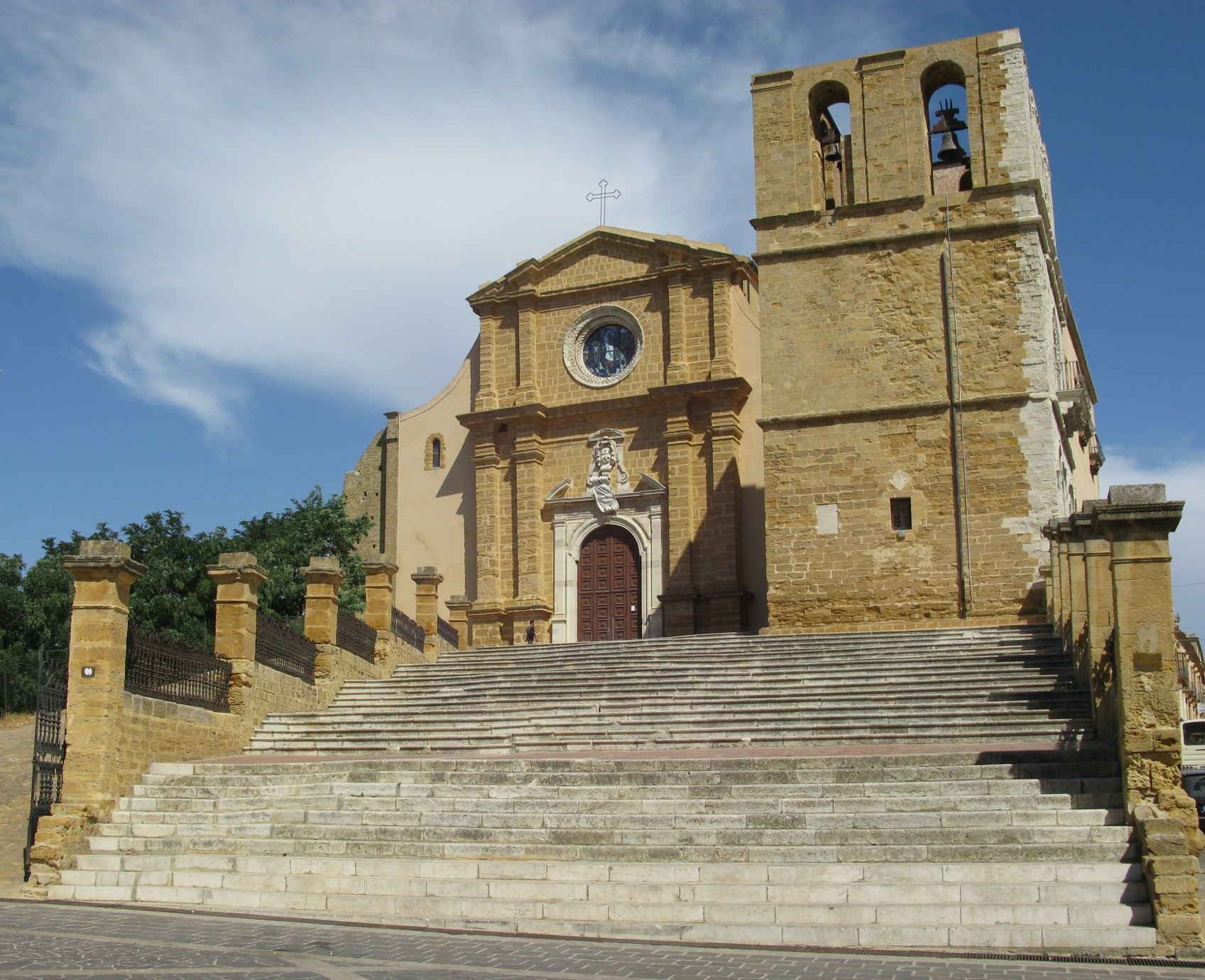
The seat of the Archdiocese of Agrigento is Cattedrale Metropolitana di San Gerlando.

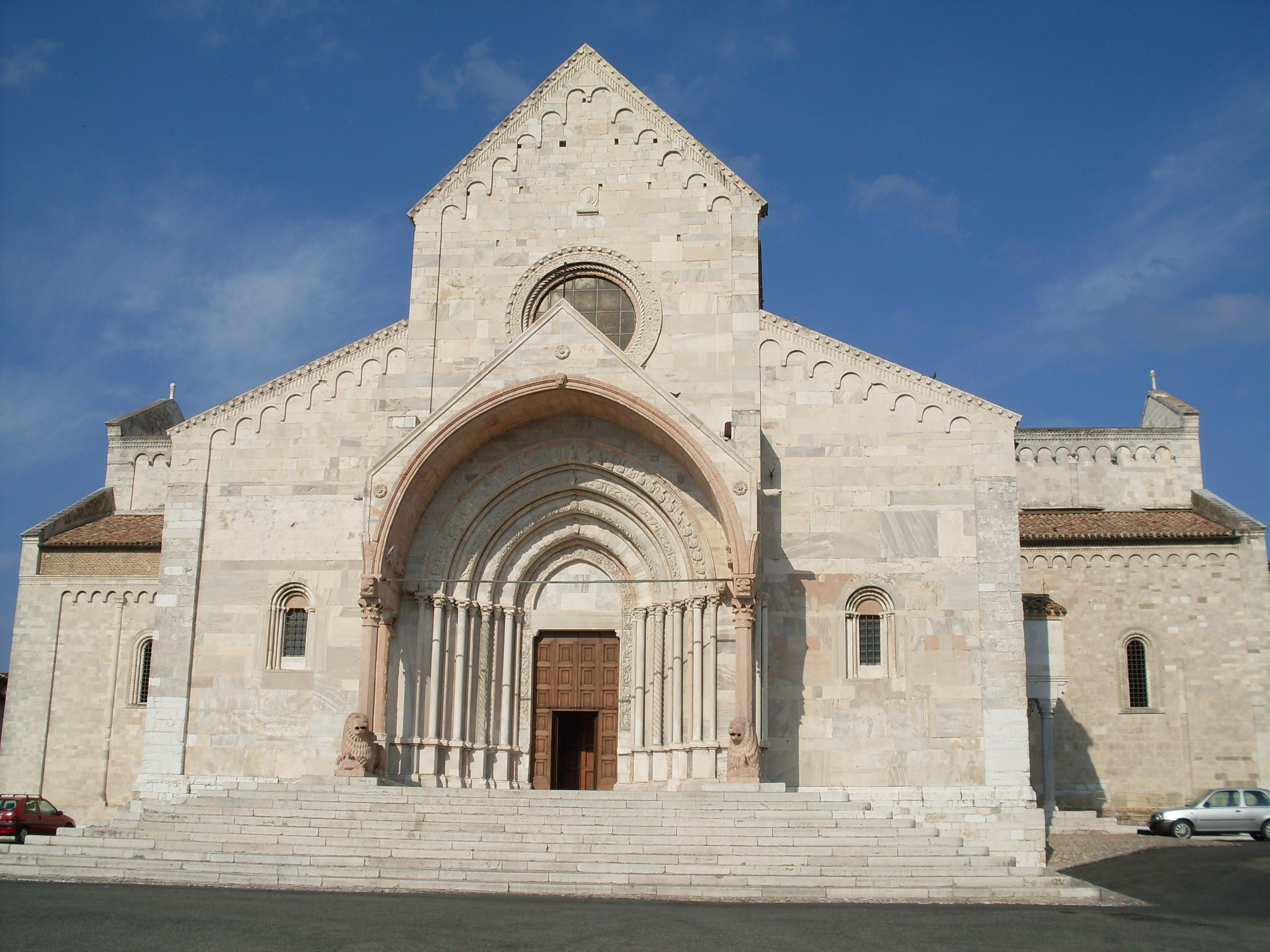
The seat of the Archdiocese of Ancona-Osimo is Basilica Cattedrale Metropolitana di San Ciriaco.

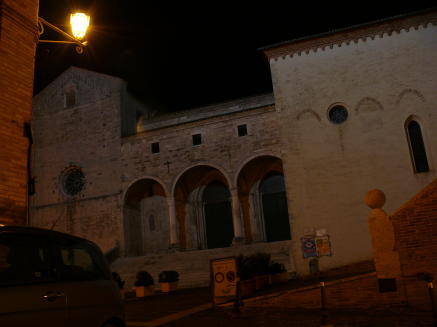
The co-seat of the Archdiocese of Ancona-Osimo is Basilica Concattedrale di S. Leopardo.

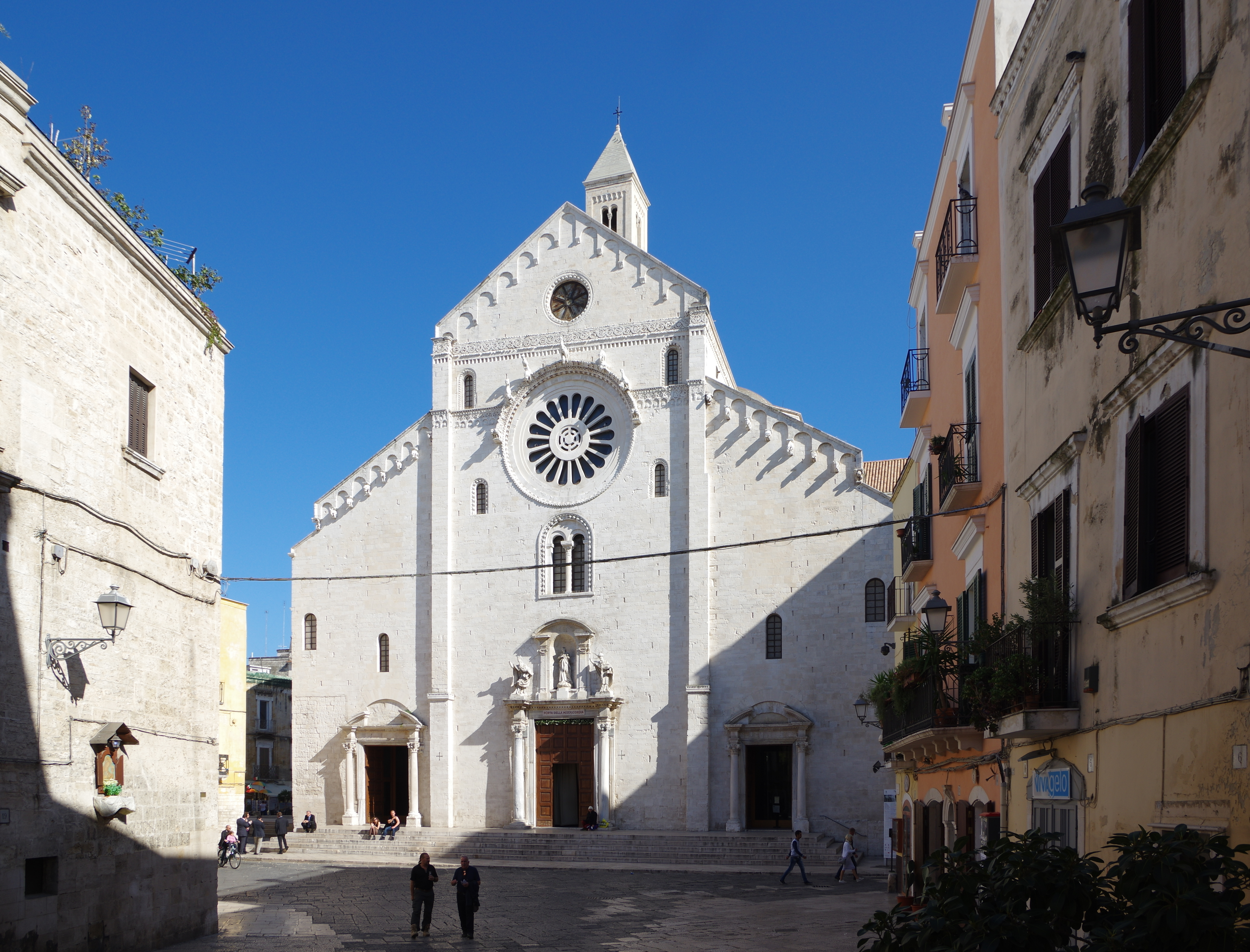
The seat of the Archdiocese of Bari-Bitonto is Cattedrale di San Sabino.

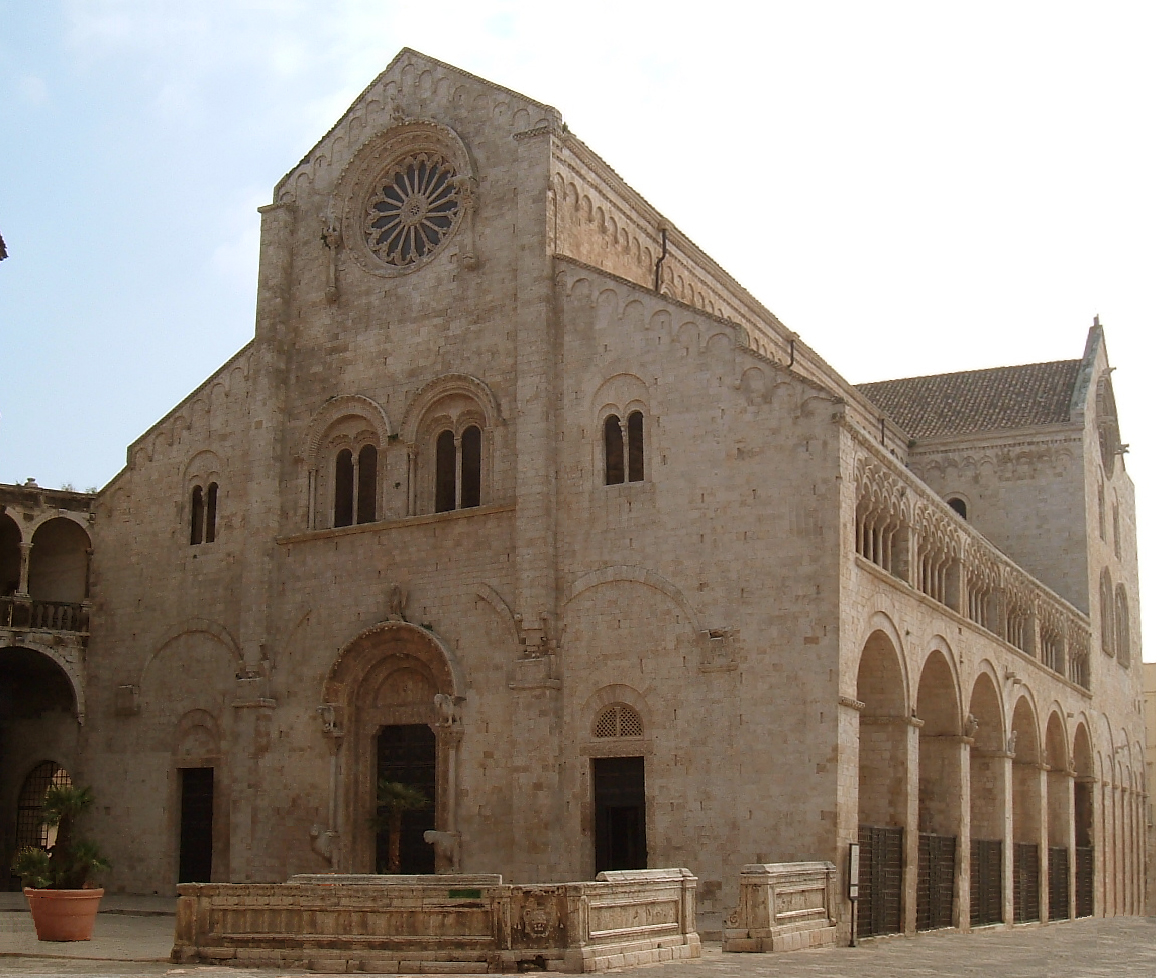
The co-seat of the Archdiocese of Bari-Bitonto is Cattedrale di San Valentino.

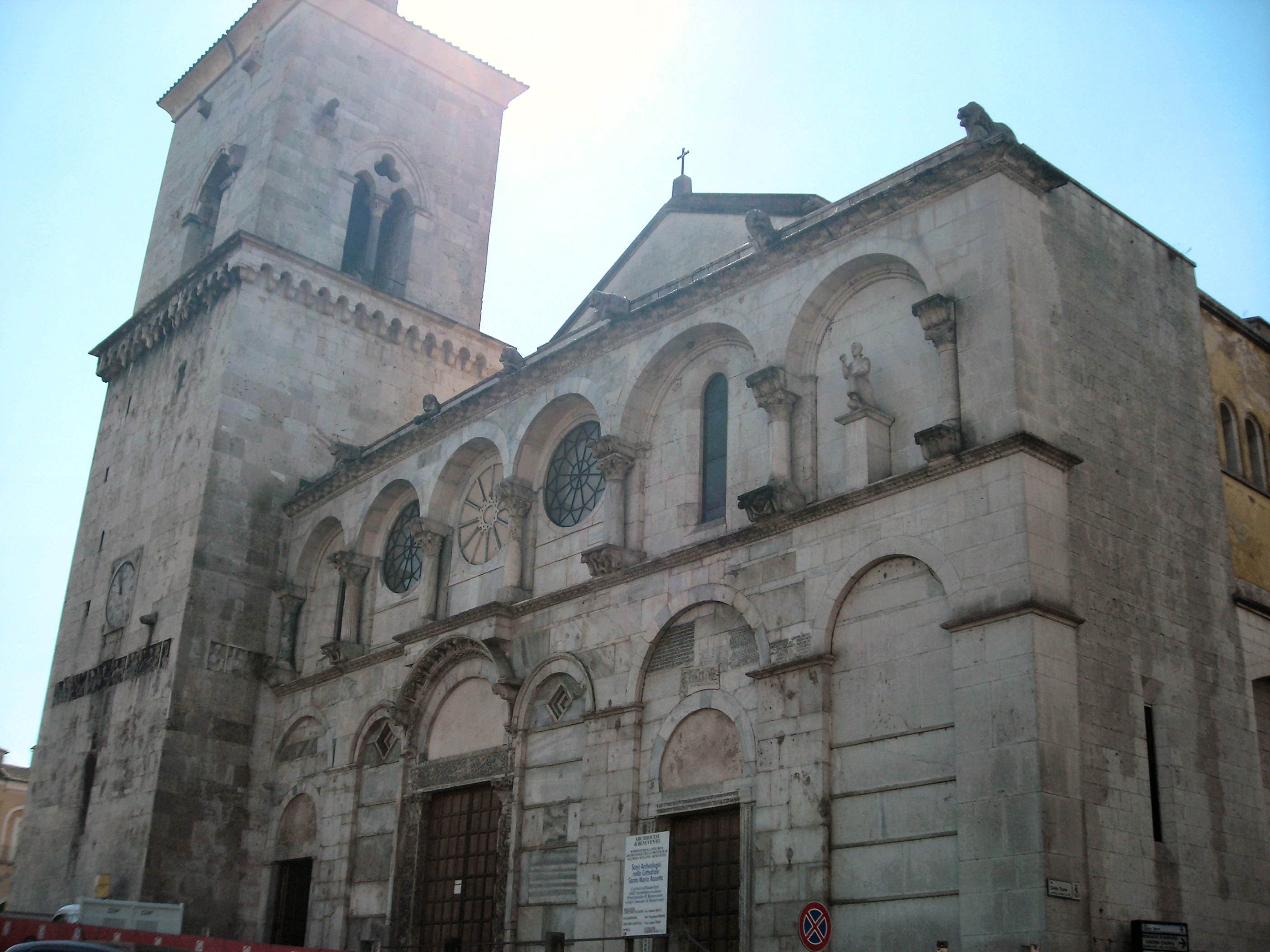
The seat of the Archdiocese of Benevento is Cattedrale di Santa Maria Assunta.

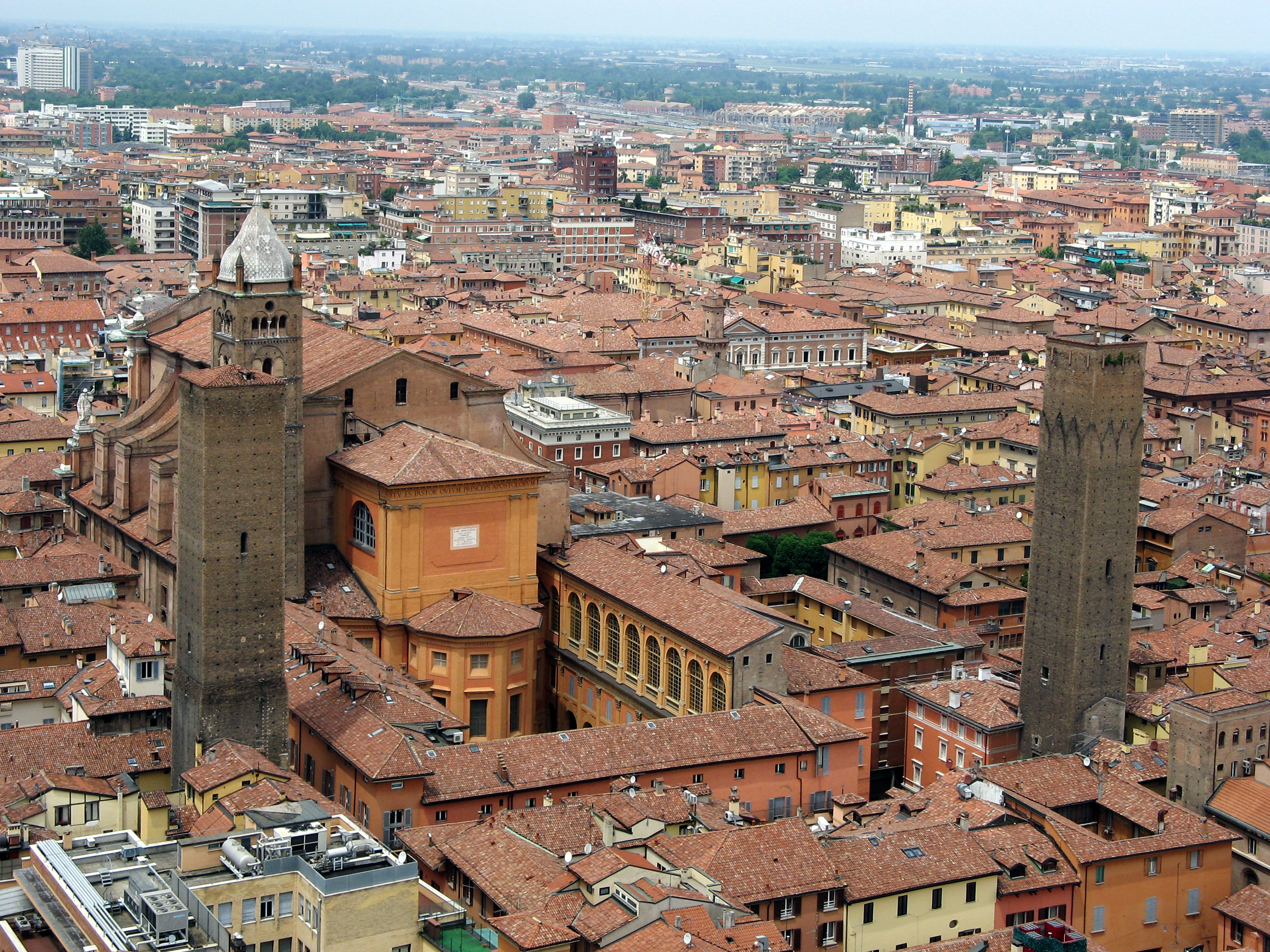
The seat of the Archdiocese of Bologna is Cattedrale Metropolitana di San Pietro.

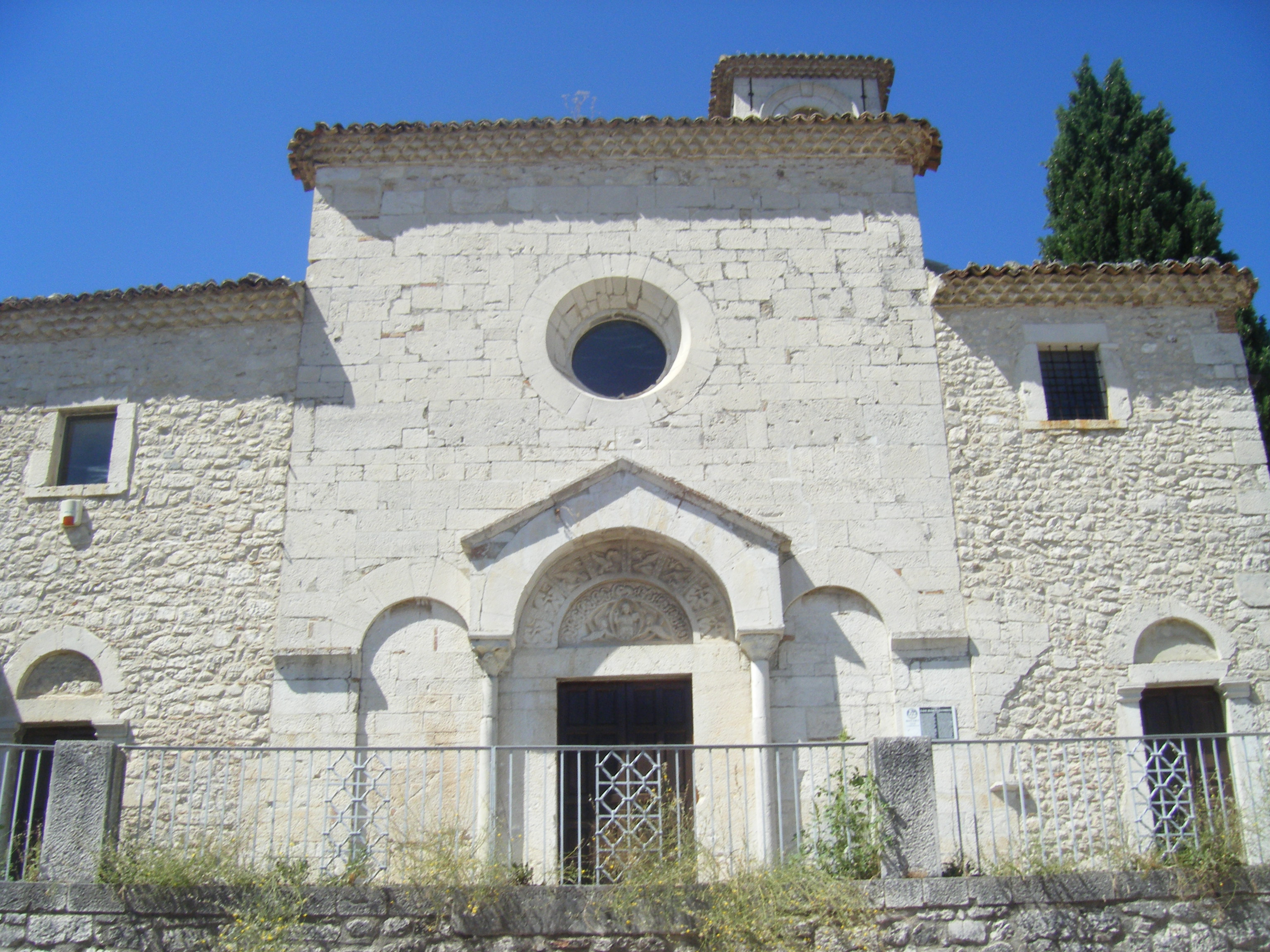
The co-seat of the Archdiocese of Campobasso-Boiano is Concattedrale di S. Bartolomeo(Boiano).

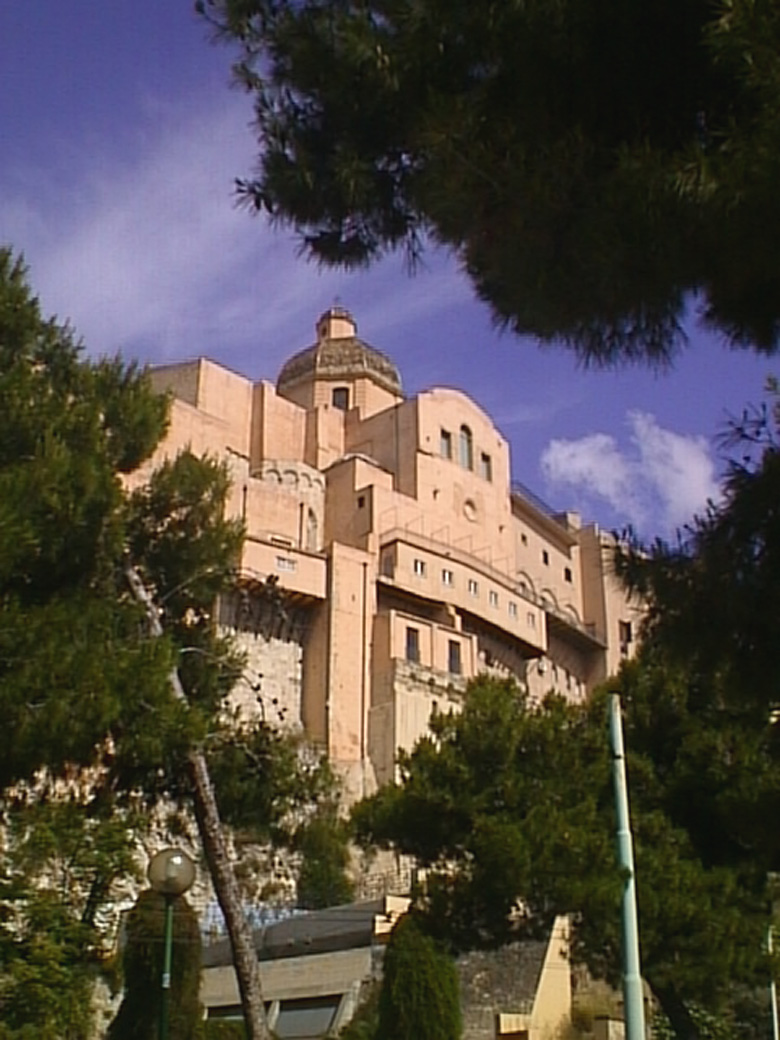
The seat of the Archdiocese of Cagliari is Cattedrale di Santa Maria e Santa Cecilia.

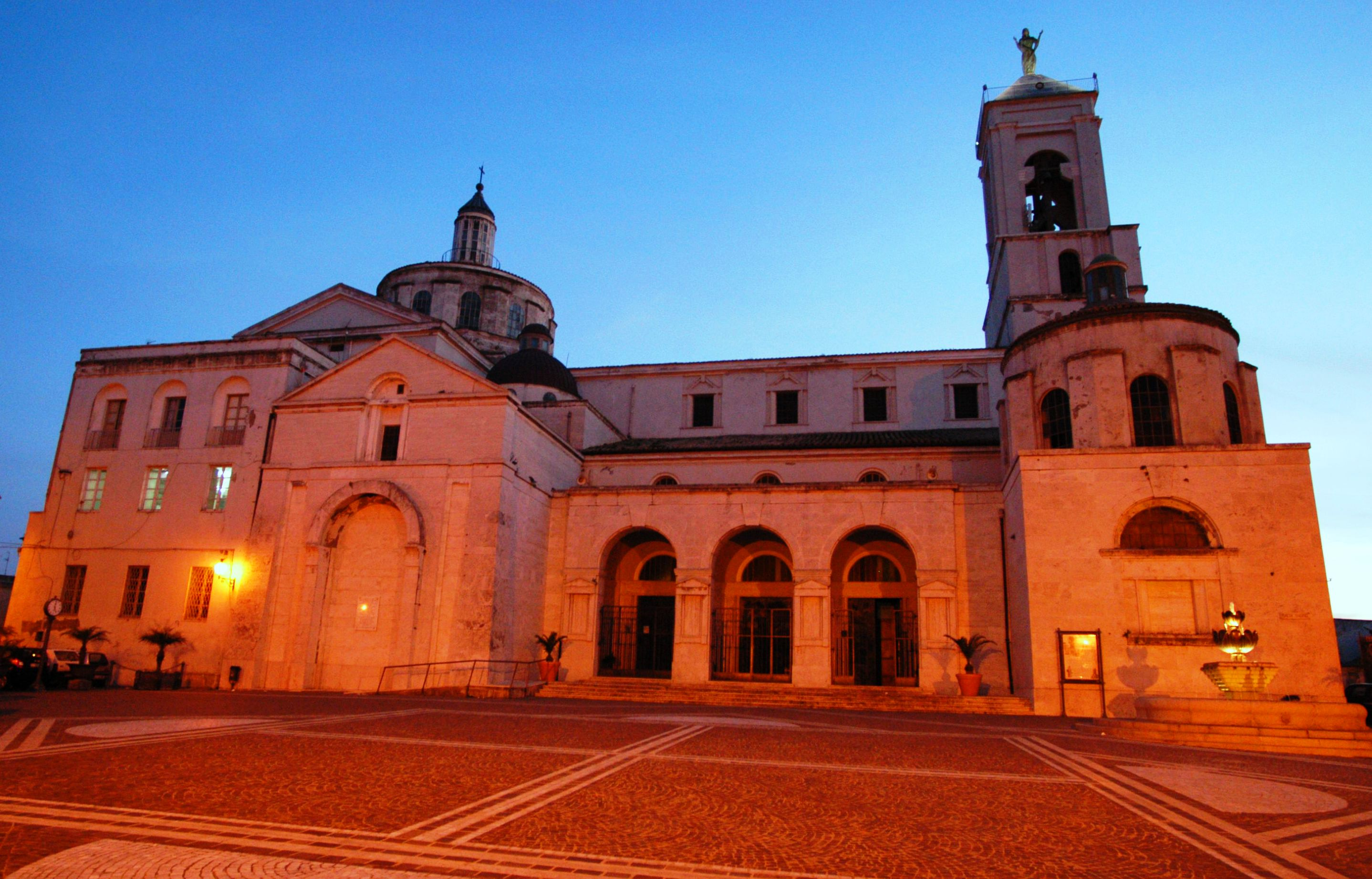
The seat of the Archdiocese of Catanzaro-Squillace is Cattedrale di S. Maria Assunta.

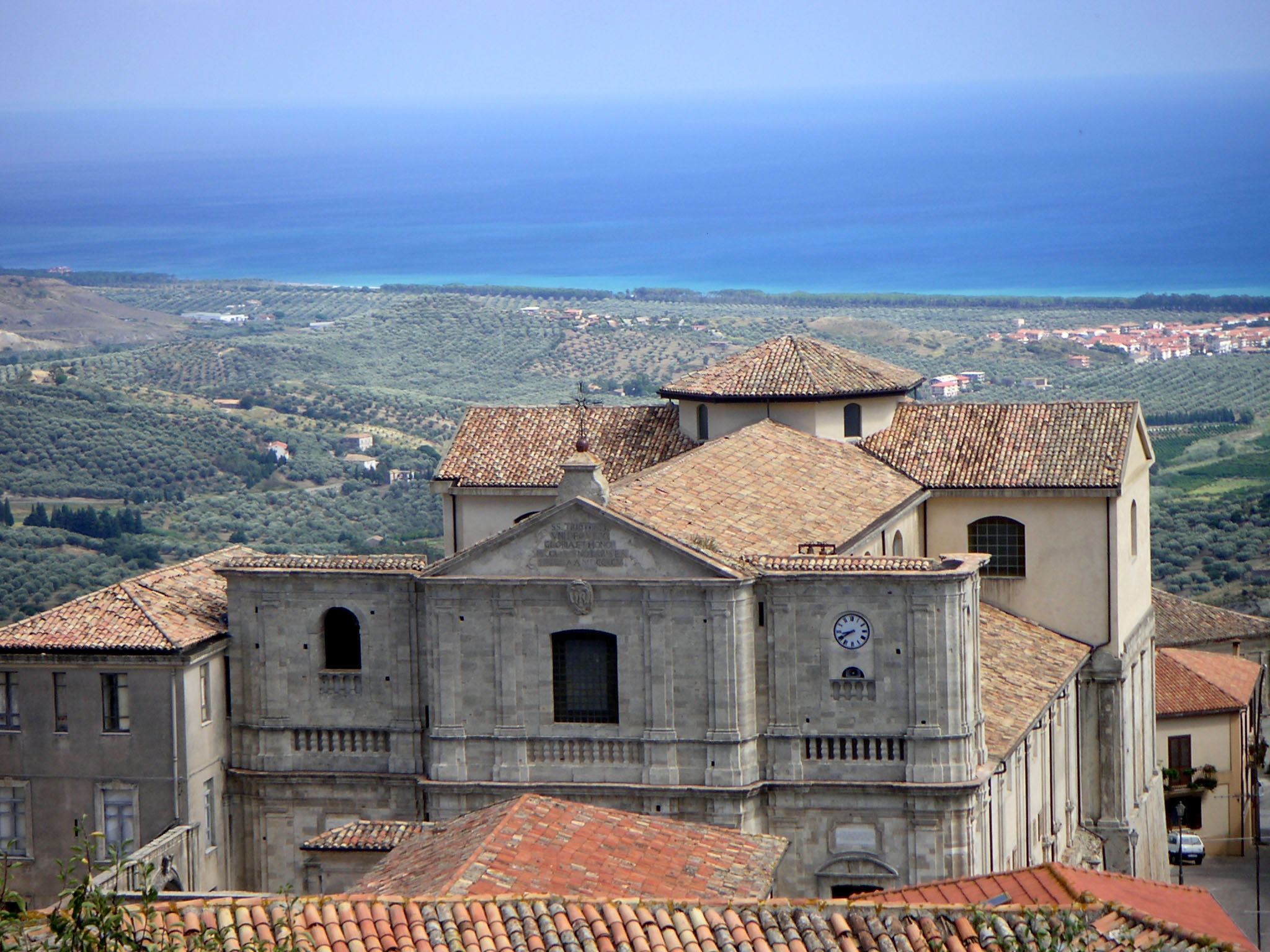
The co-seat of the Archdiocese of Catanzaro-Squillace is Concattedrale di S. Maria Assunta(Squillace).

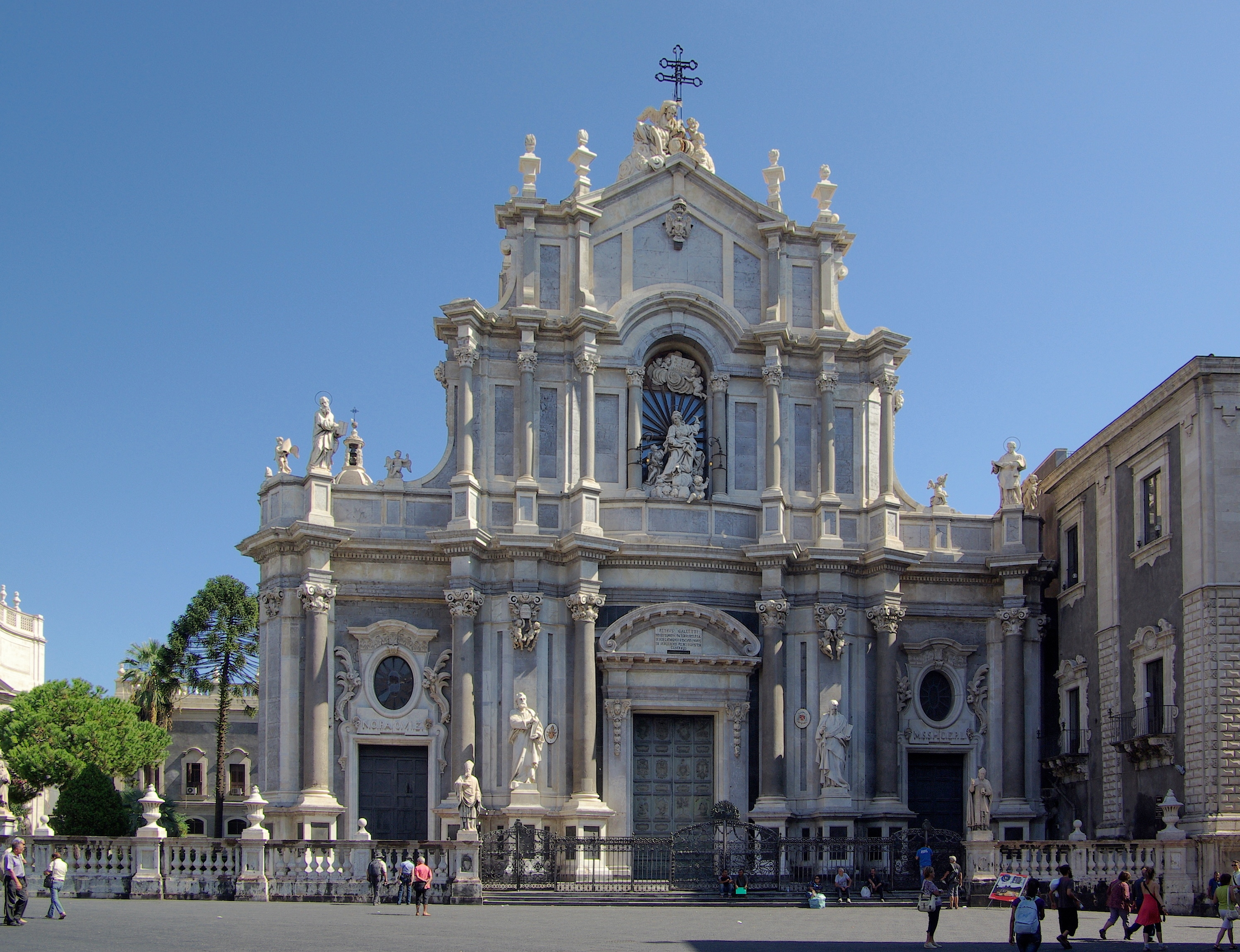
The seat of the Archdiocese of Catania is Cattedrale di Sant'Agata.

The seat of the Archdiocese of Chieti-Vasto is Cattedrale di S. Giustino.

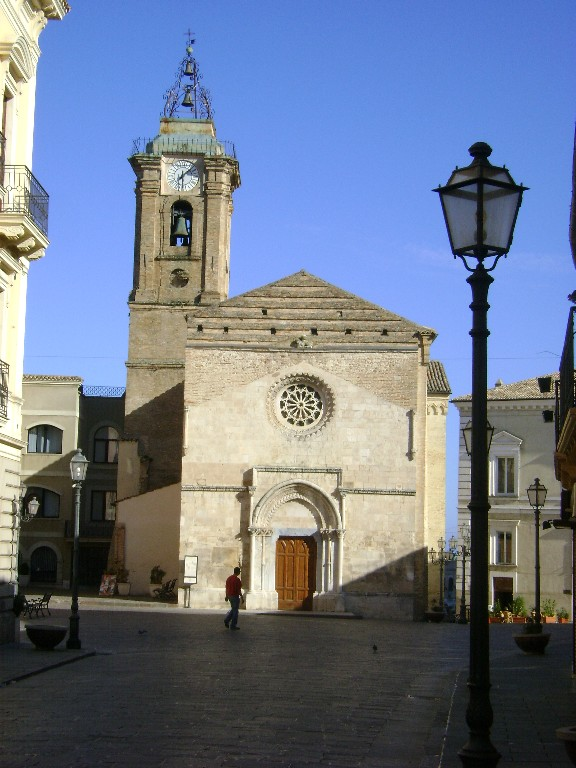
The co-seat of the Archdiocese of Chieti-Vasto is Concattedrale di S. Giuseppe(Vasto).

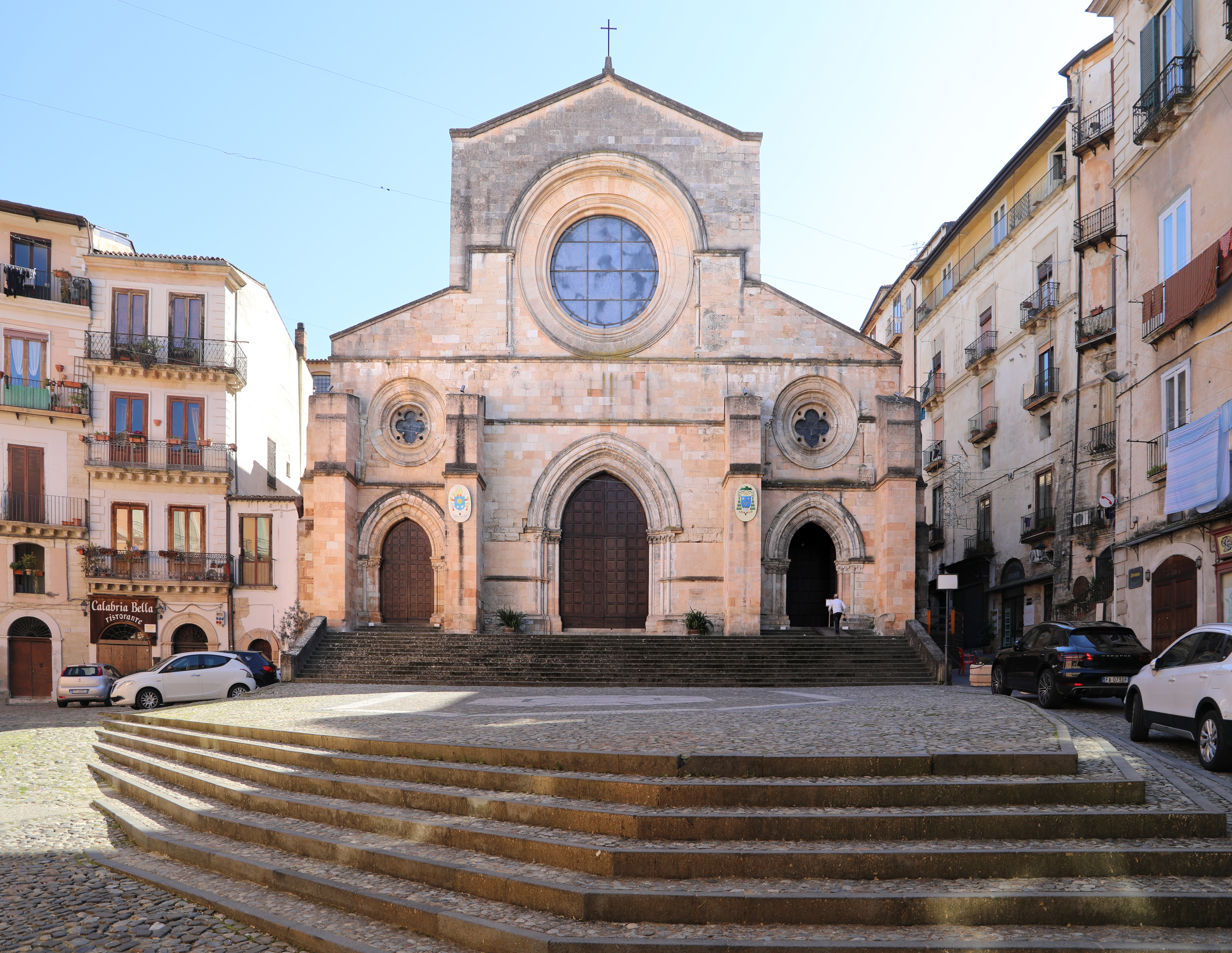
The seat of the Archdiocese of Cosenza-Bisignano is Cattedrale di S. Maria Assunta.

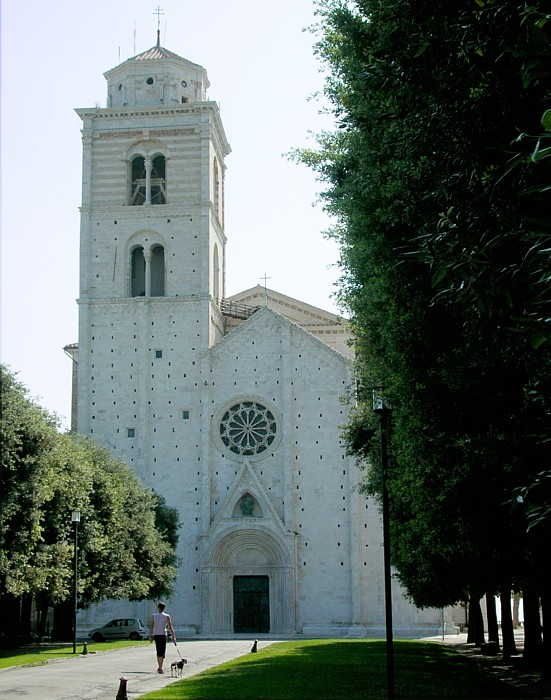
The seat of the Archdiocese of Fermo is Basilica Cattedrale di Maria SS. Assunta in Cielo.

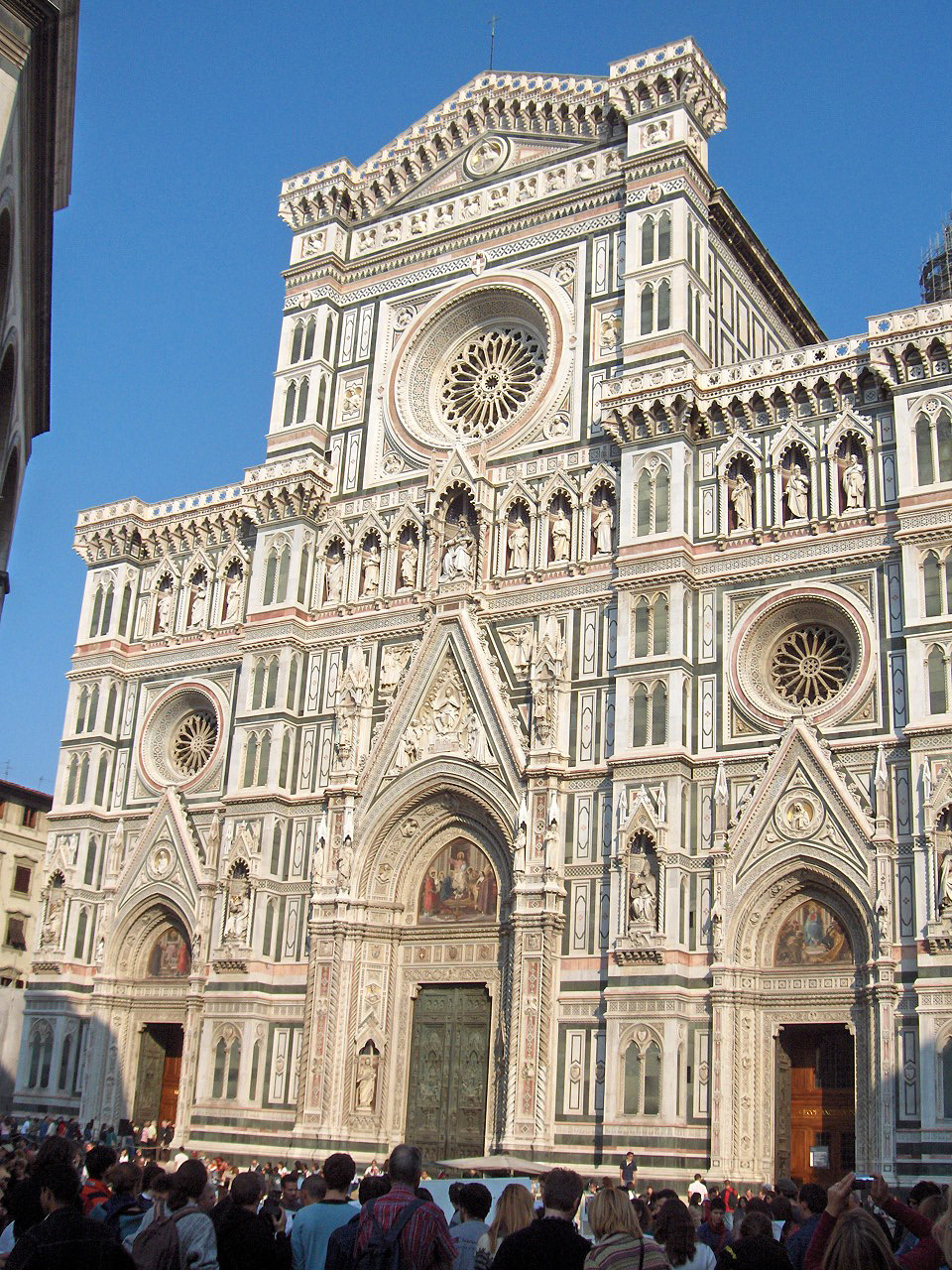
The seat of the Archdiocese of Florence is Basilica di Santa Maria del Fiore.

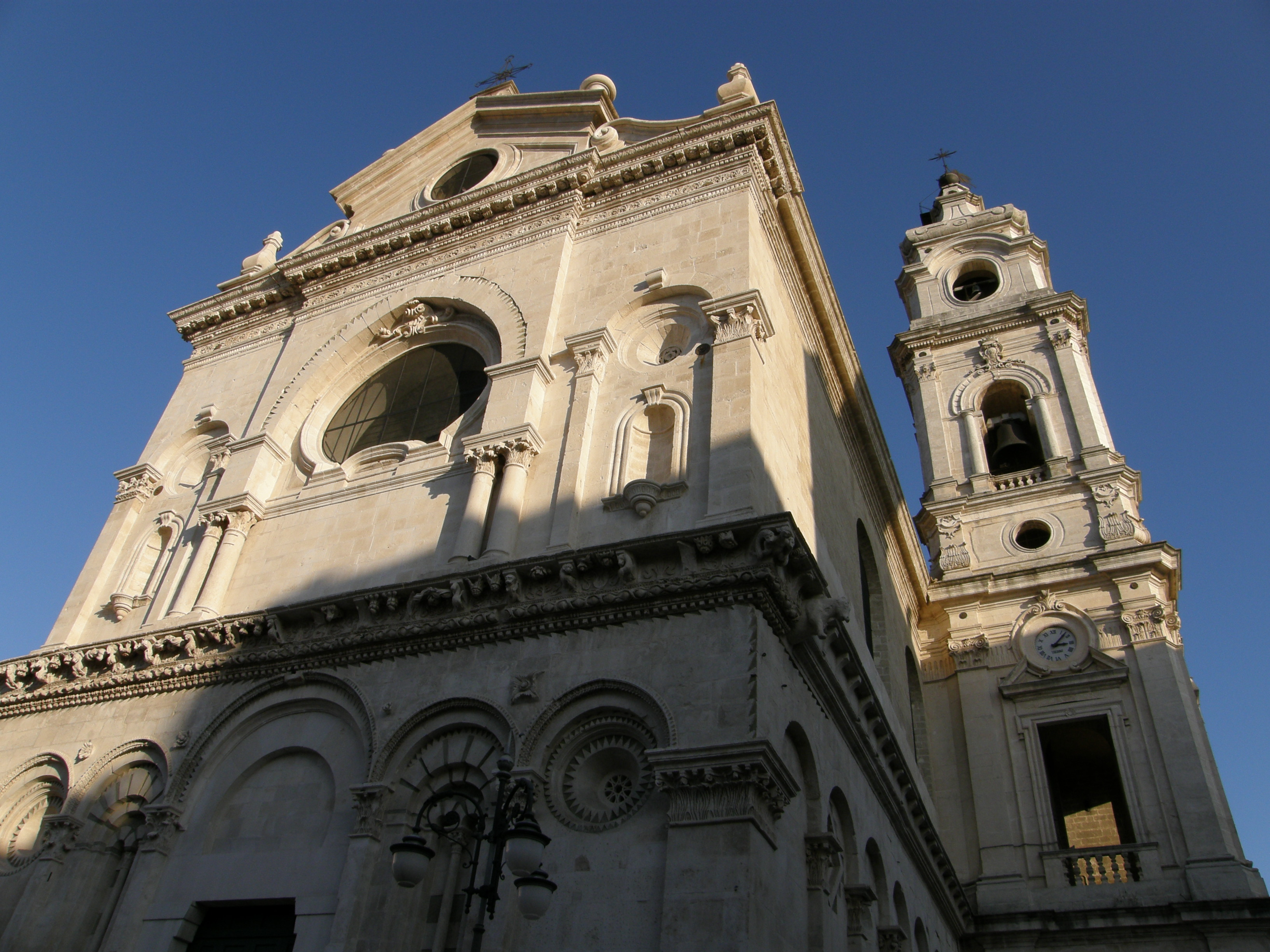
The seat of the Archdiocese of Foggia-Bovino is Cattedrale di S. Maria Assunta in Cielo.

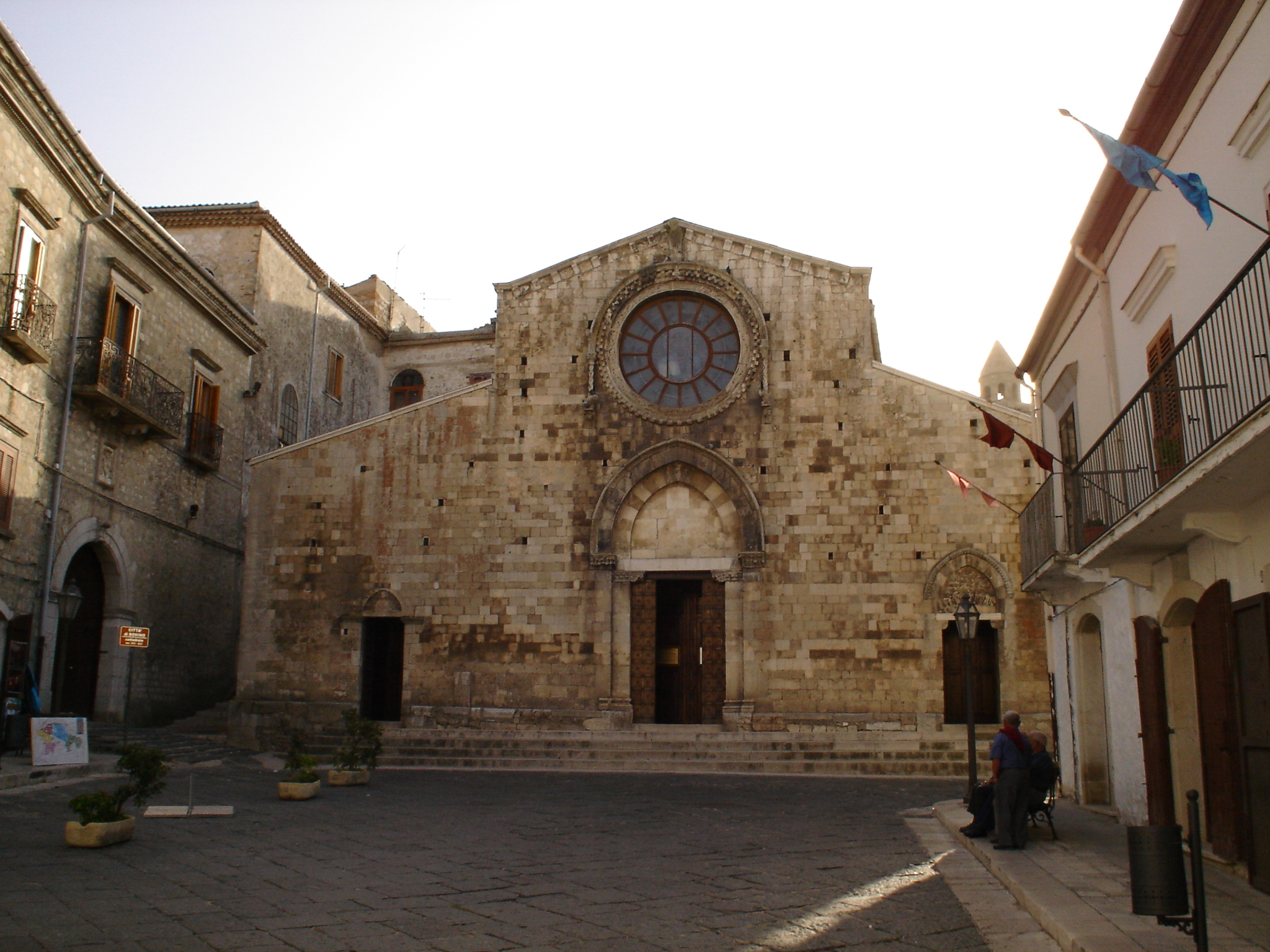
The co-seat of the Archdiocese of Foggia-Bovino is Basilica Concattedrale di S. Maria Assunta(Bovino).

The seat of the Archdiocese of Genoa is Cattedrale di San Lorenzo.

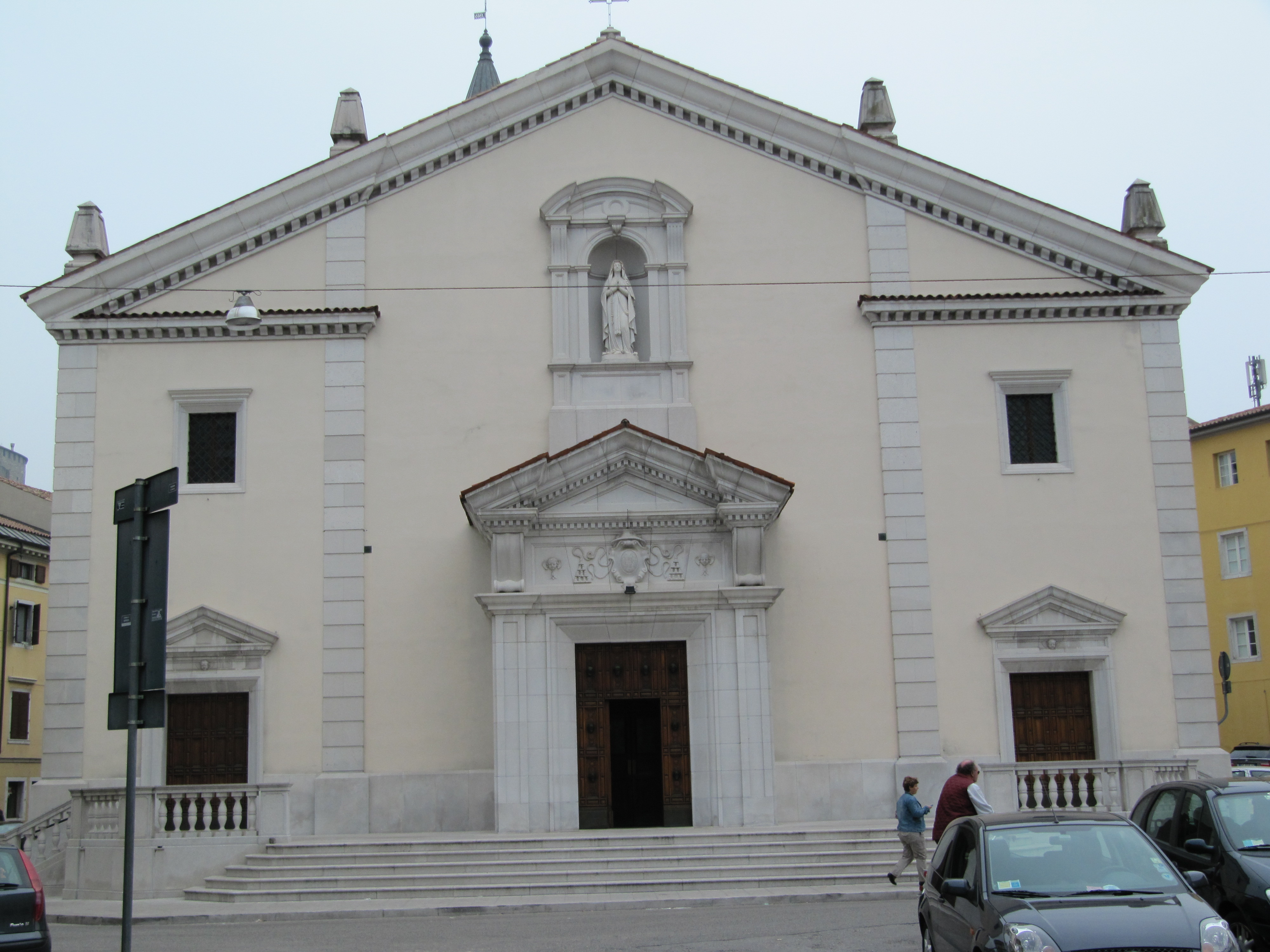
The seat of the Archdiocese of Gorizia is Cattedrale di Ss. Ilario e Taziano.

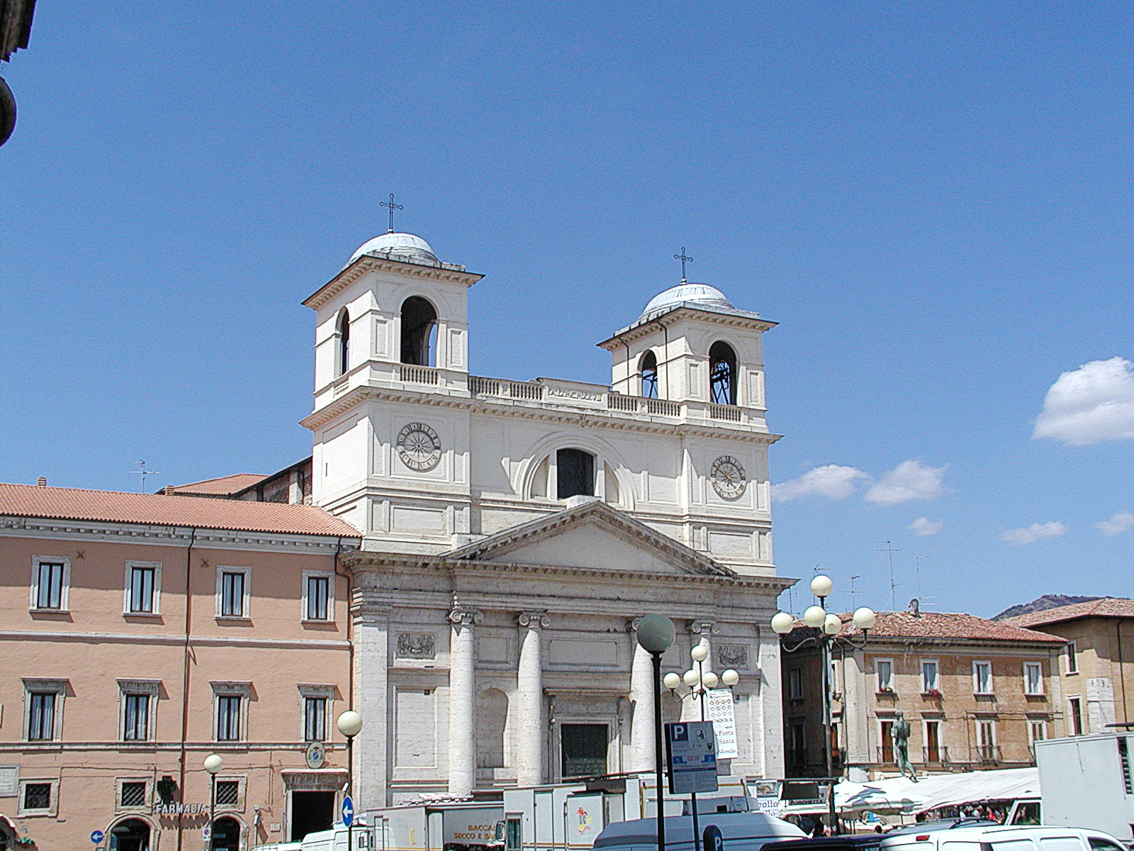
The seat of the Archdiocese of L'Aquila is Cattedrale di SS. Massimo e Giorgio.

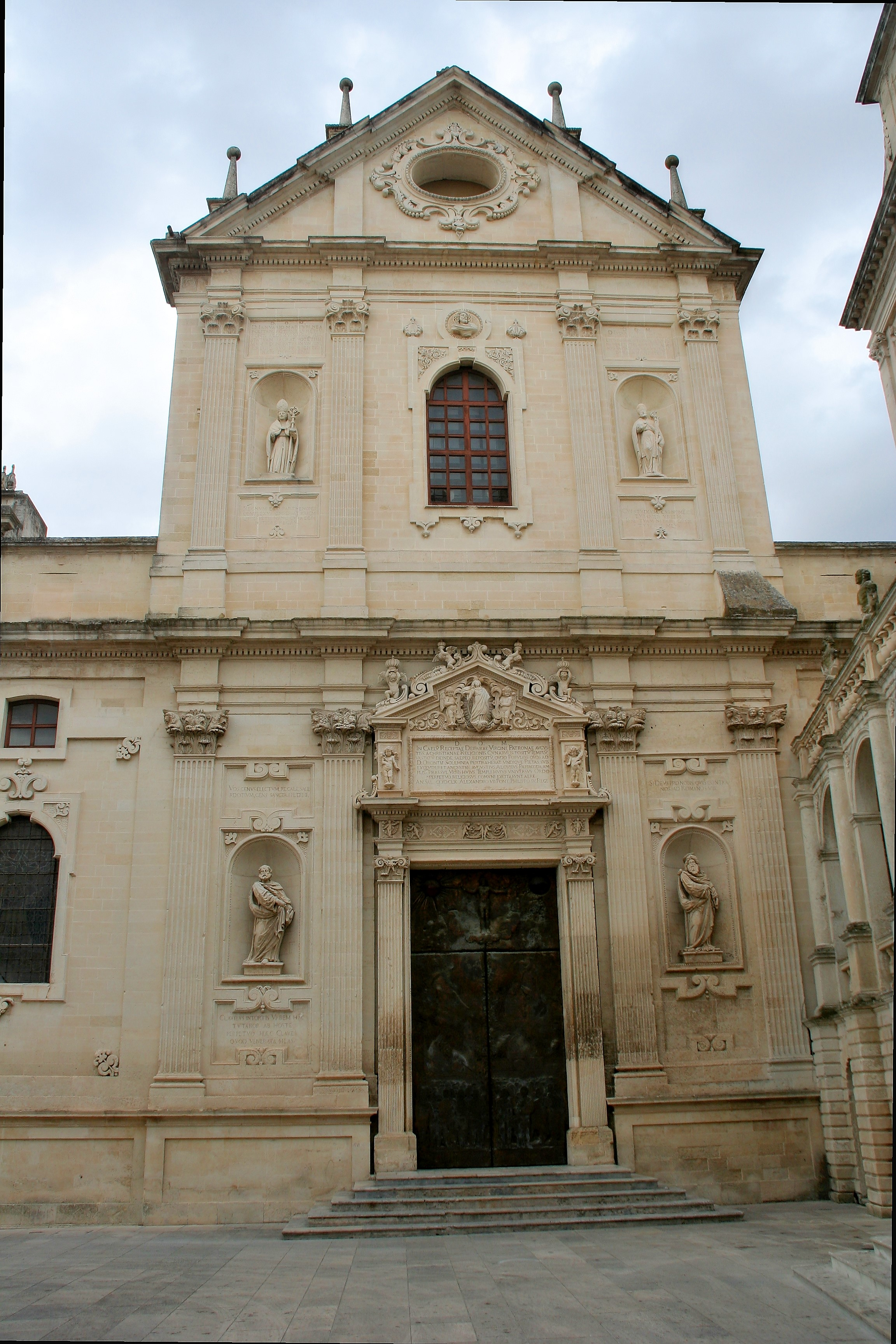
The seat of the Archdiocese of Lecce is Cattedrale di Maria SS. Assunta.

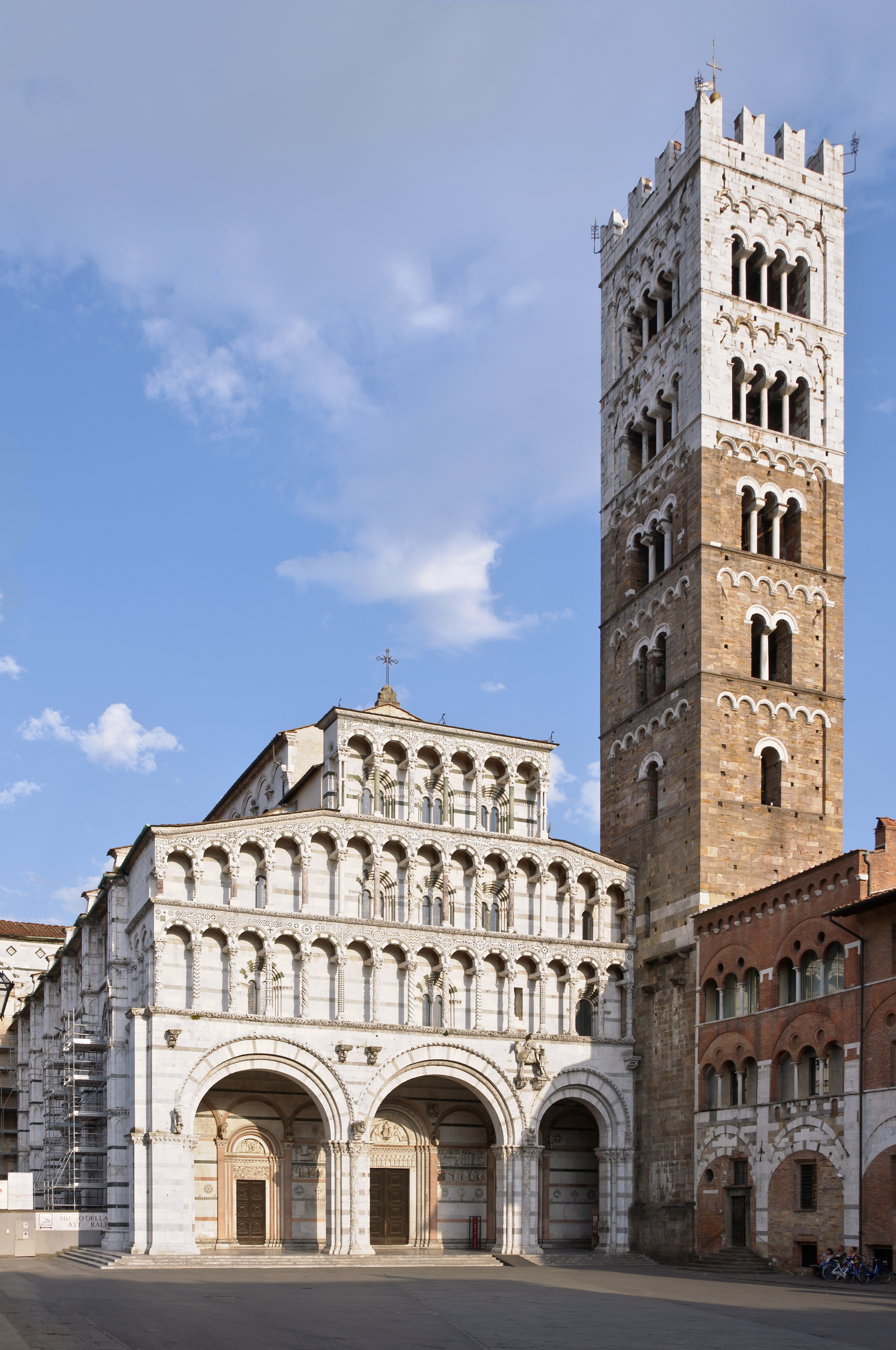
The seat of the Archdiocese of Lucca is Cattedrale di S. Martino.

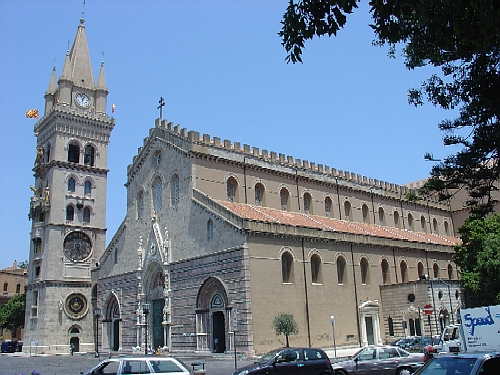
The seat of the Archdiocese of Messina-Lipari-Santa Lucia del Mela is Basilica Cattedrale di S. Maria SS. Assunta.

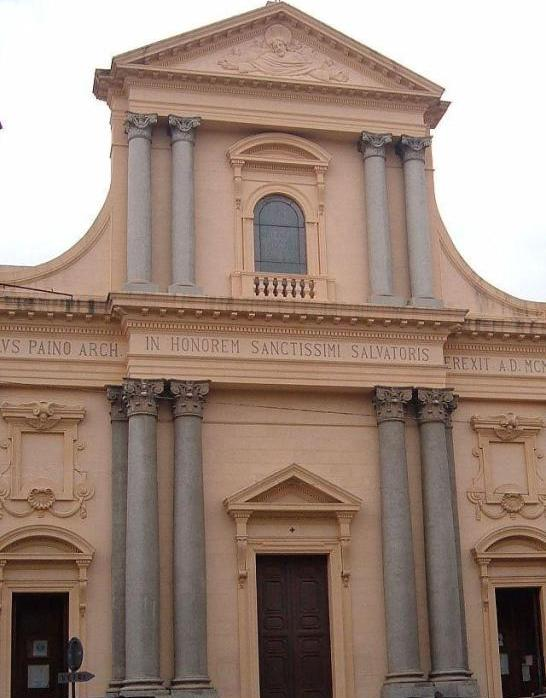
The co-seat of the Archdiocese of Messina-Lipari-Santa Lucia del Mela is Concattedrale Archimandritato del Santissimo Salvatore(Messina).

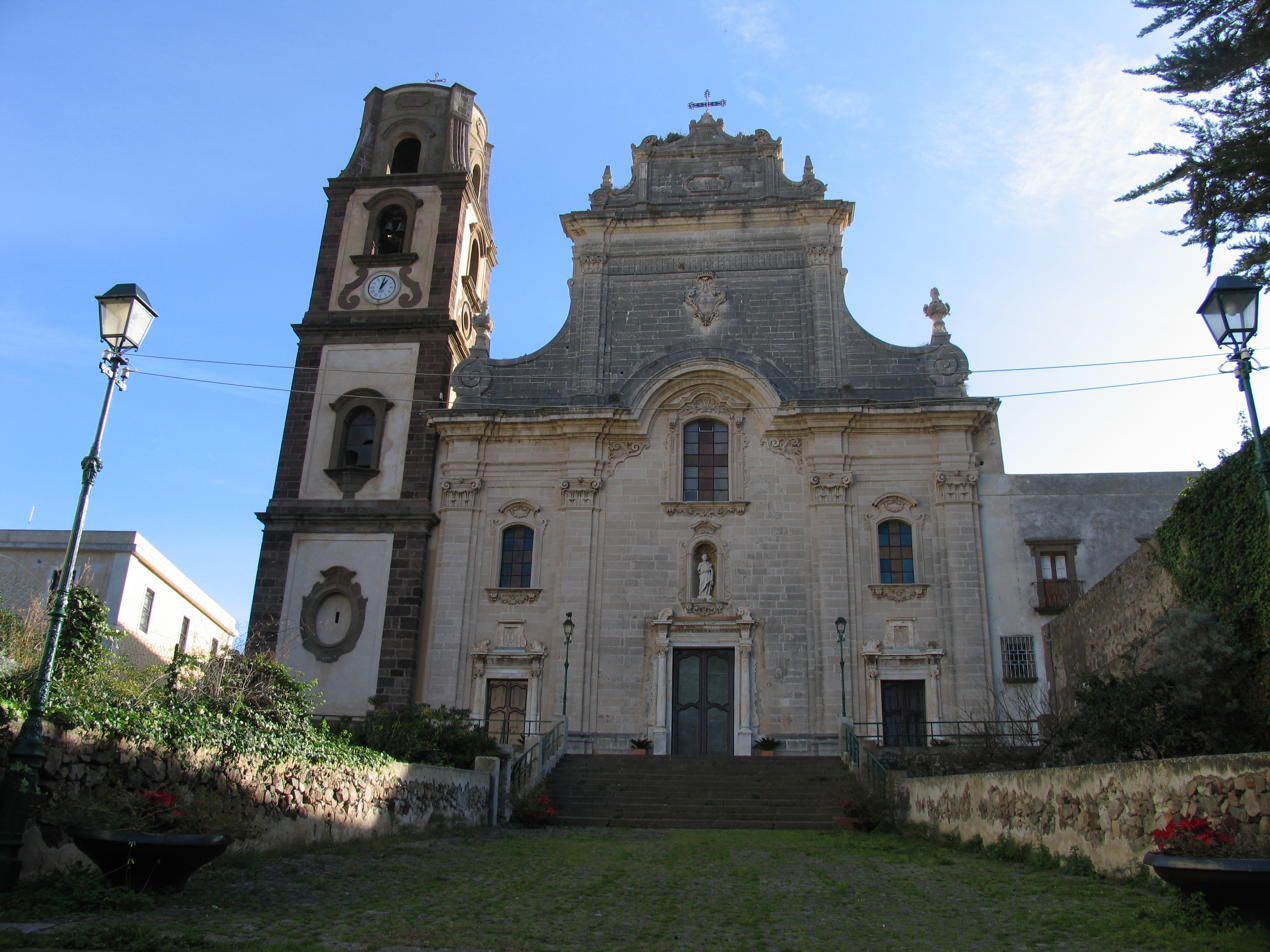
The co-seat of the Archdiocese of Messina-Lipari-Santa Lucia del Mela is Concattedrale di S. Bartolomeo(Lipari).

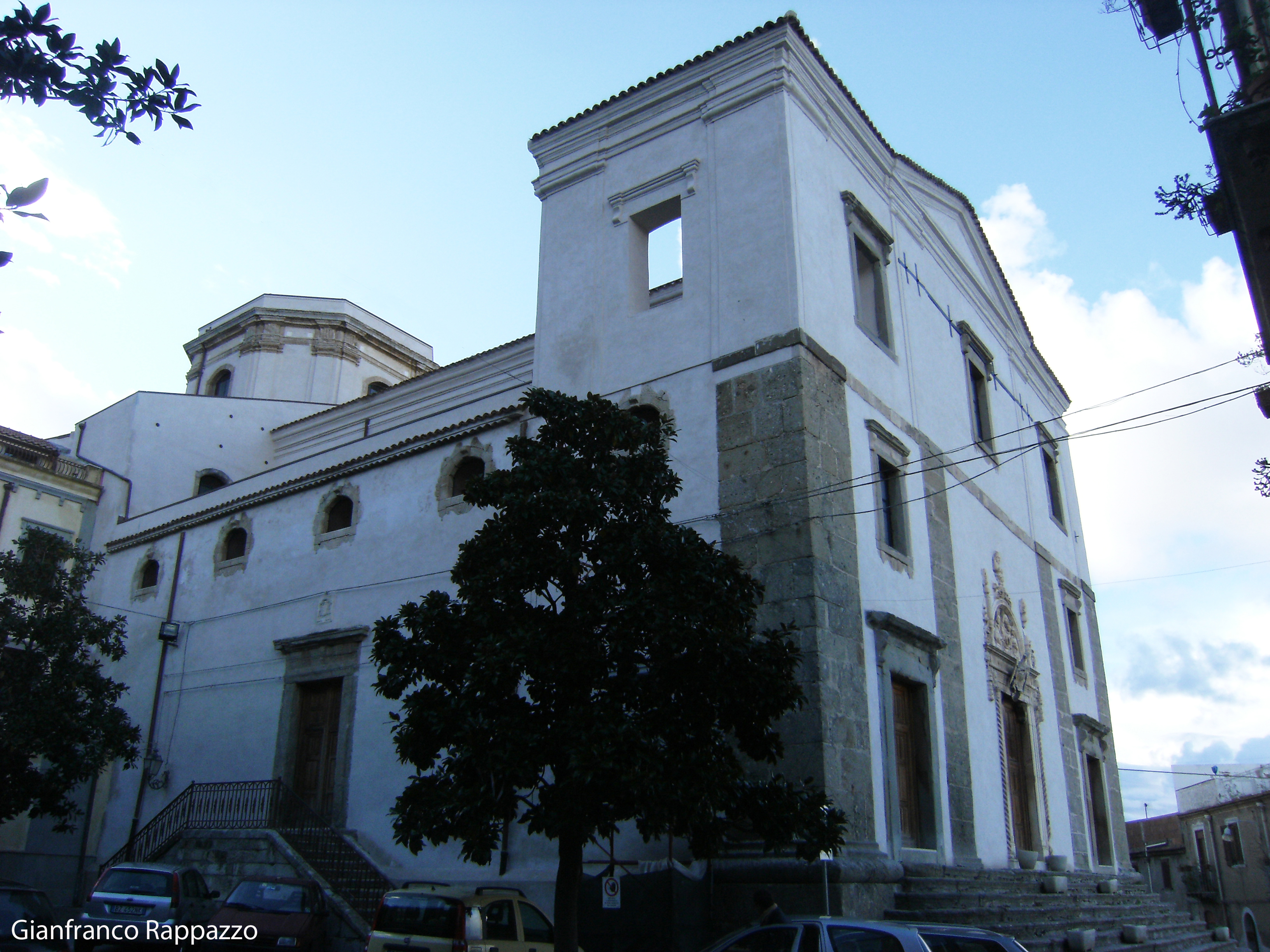
The co-seat of the Archdiocese of Messina-Lipari-Santa Lucia del Mela is Concattedrale di S. Maria Assunta(San Lucia) .

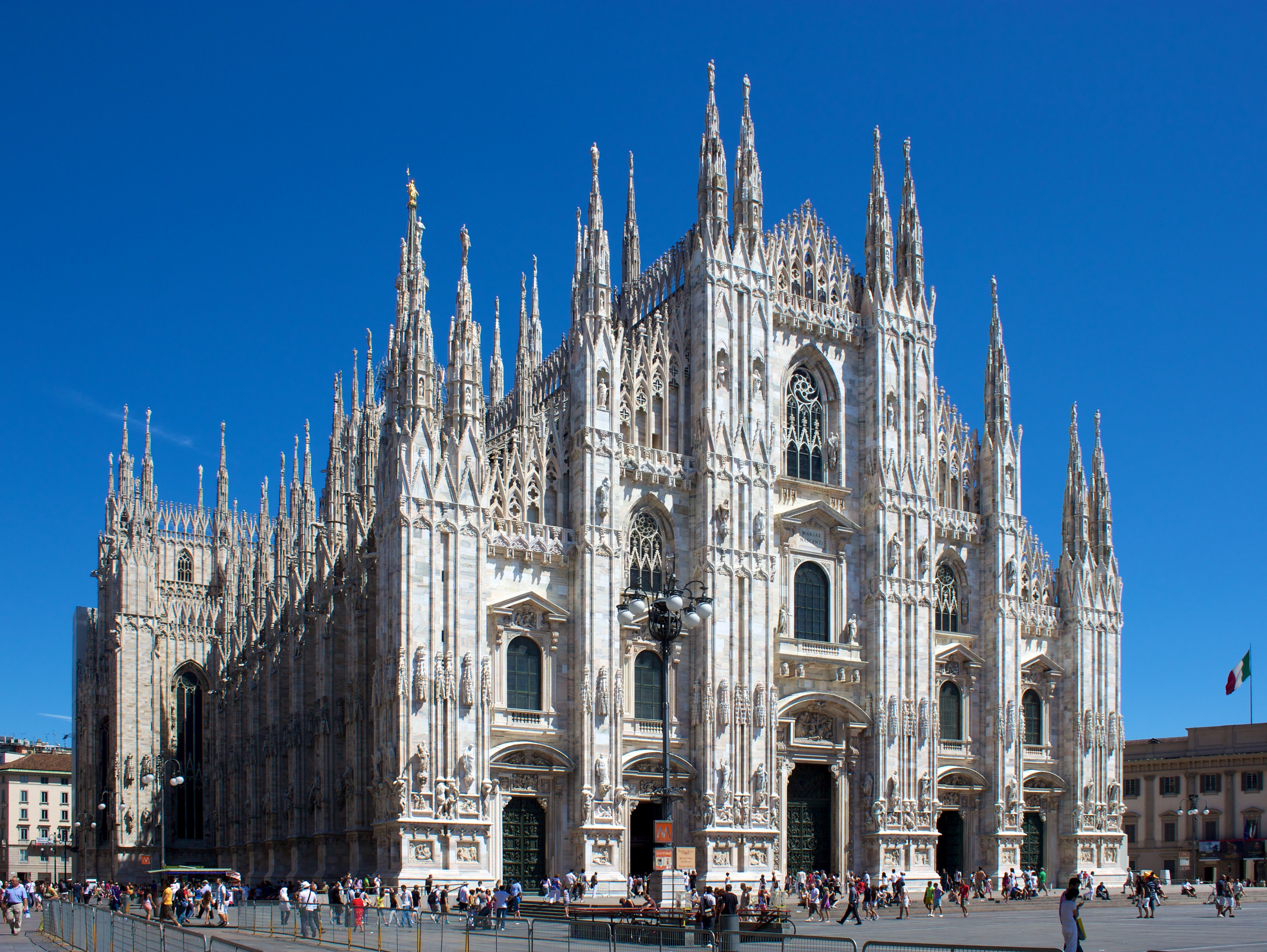
The seat of the Archdiocese of Milan is Cattedrale di S. Maria Nascente.

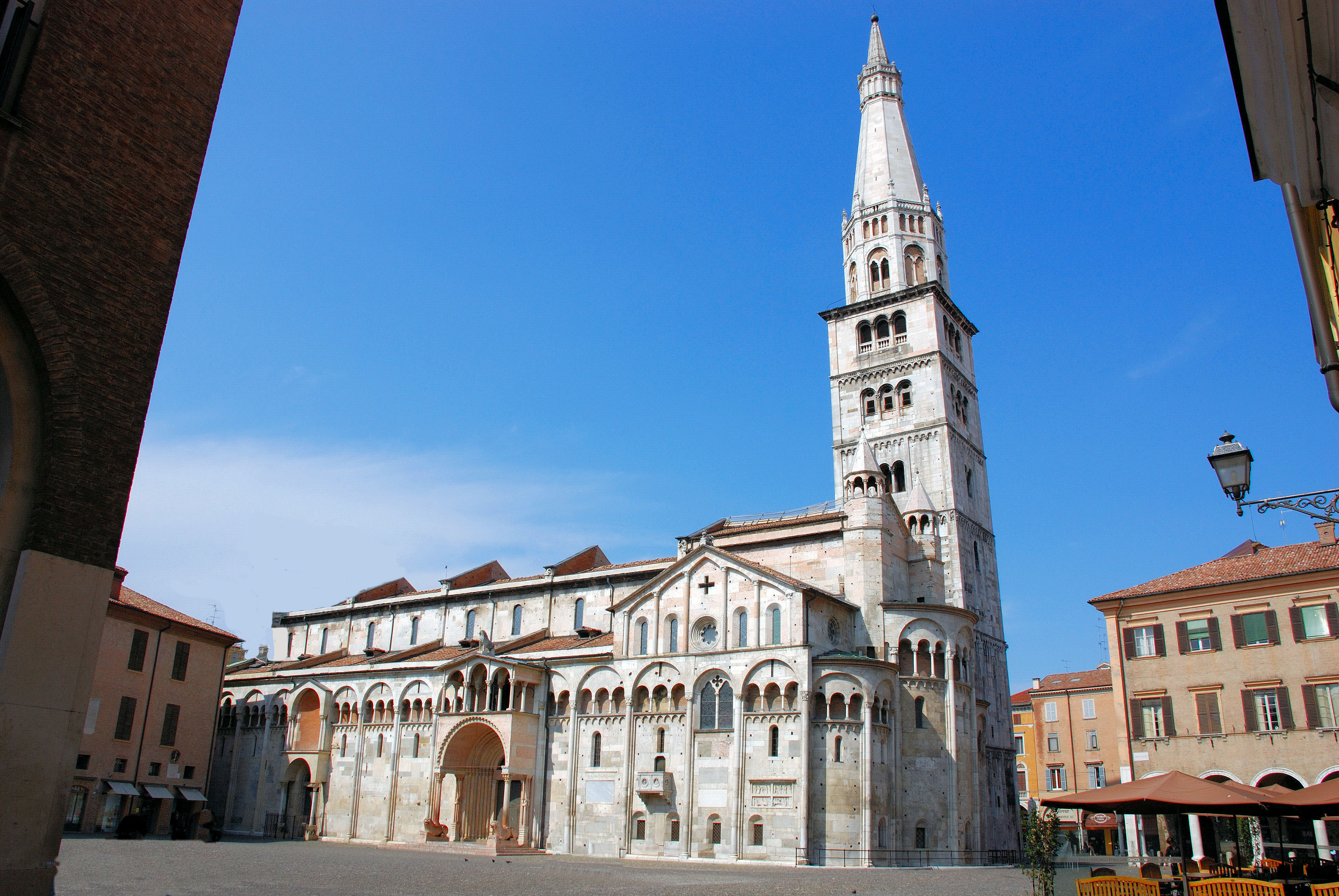
The seat of the Archdiocese of Modena-Nonantola is Basilica Cattedrale di S. Maria Assunta.

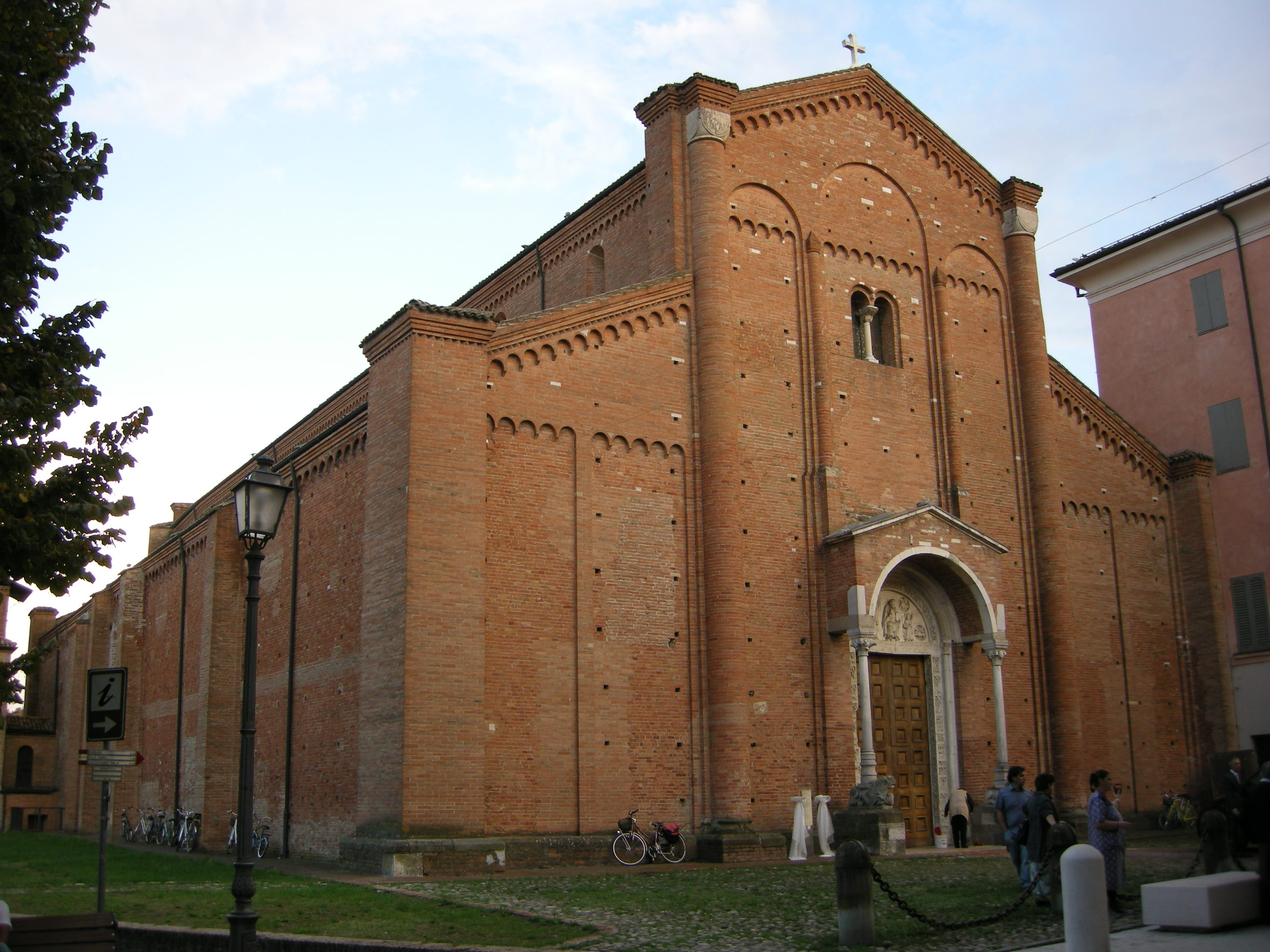
The co-seat of the Archdiocese of Modena-Nonantola is Basilica Abbaziale di San Silvestro I Papa(Nonantola).

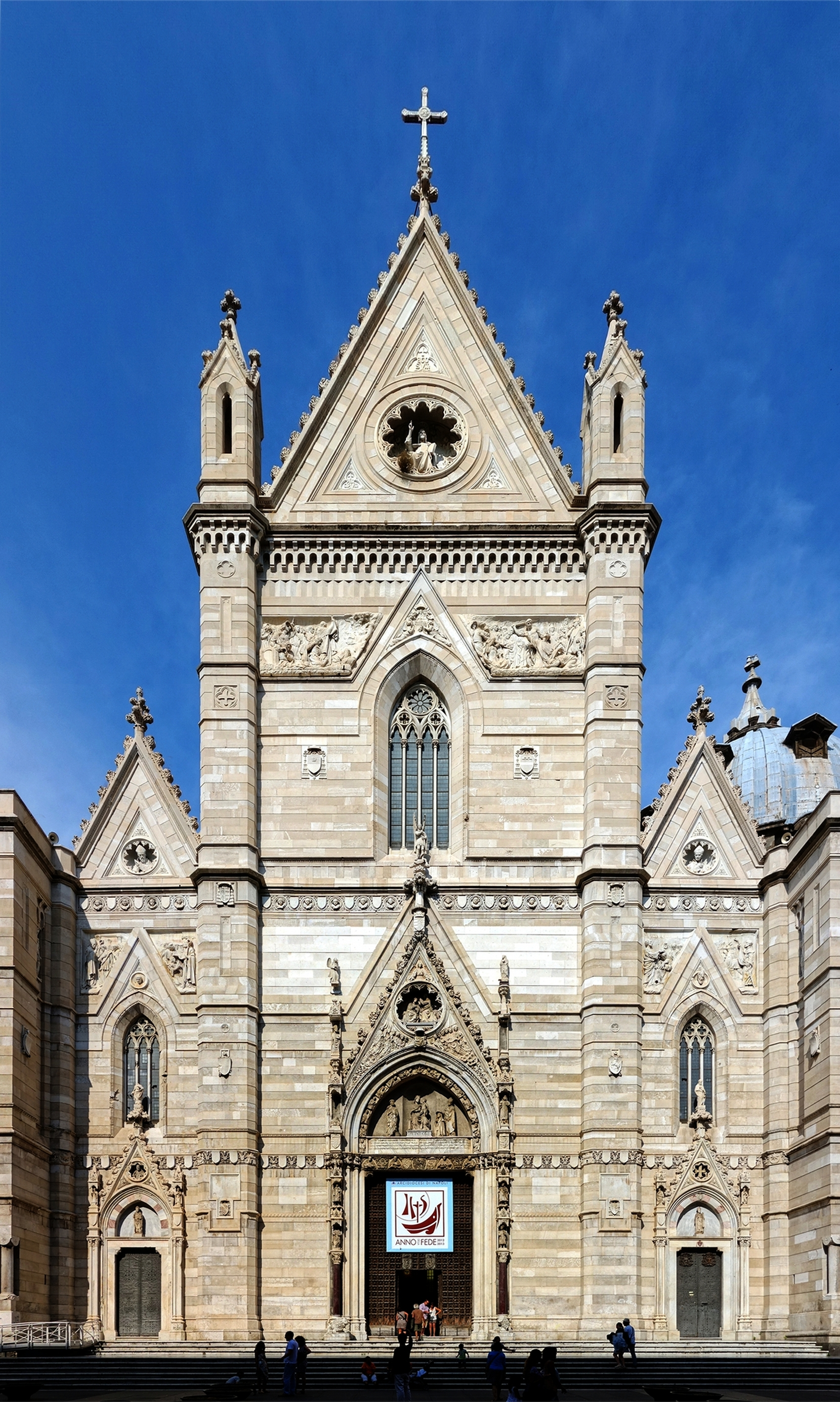
The seat of the Archdiocese of Naples is Cattedrale di Santa Maria Assunta.

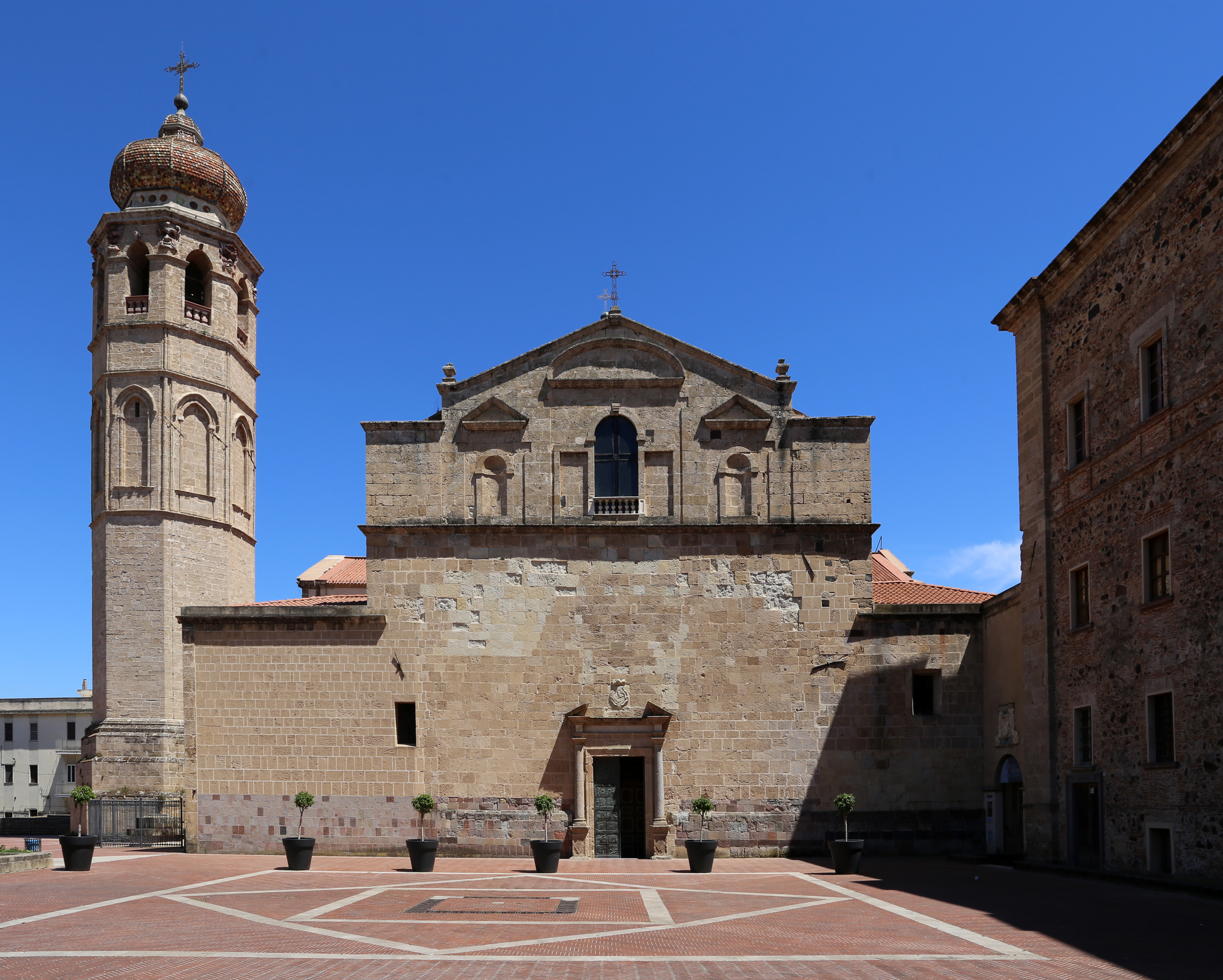
The seat of the Archdiocese of Oristano is Cattedrale di S. Maria Assunta.

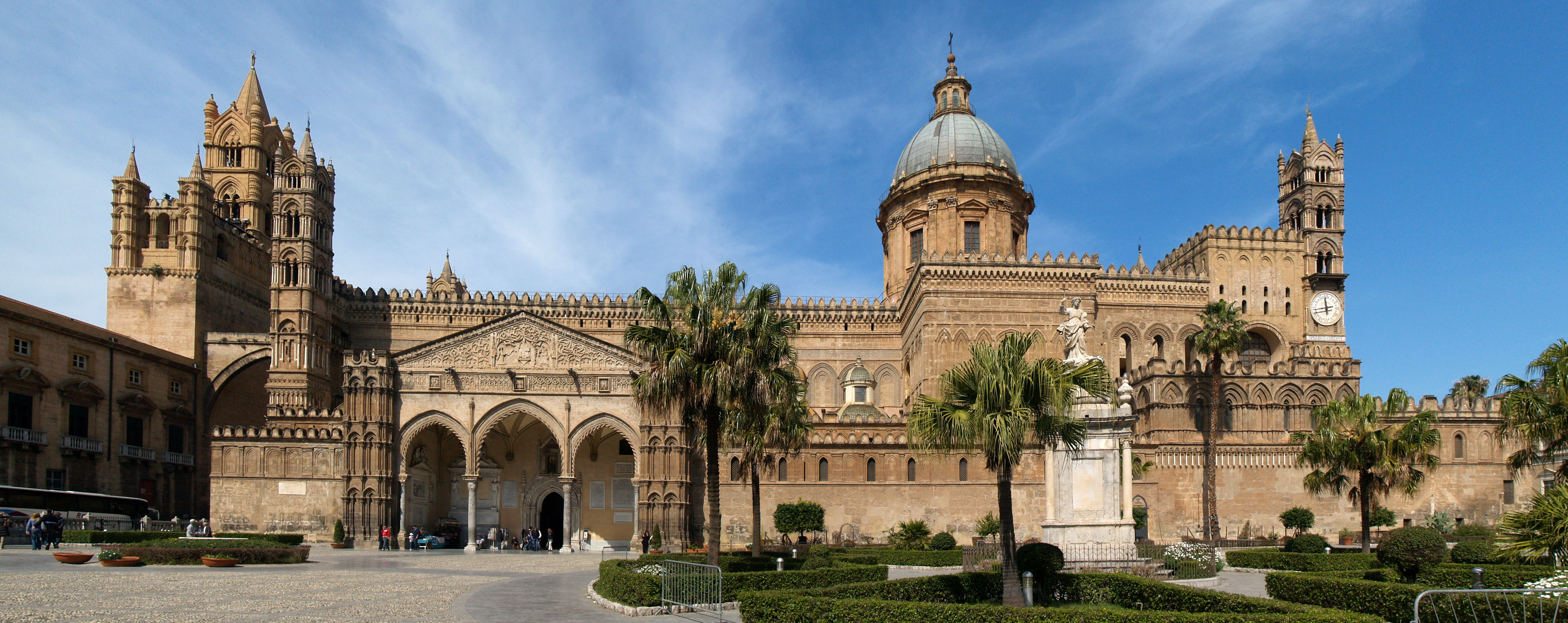
The seat of the Archdiocese of Palermo is Cattedrale di l’Assunzione di Maria.

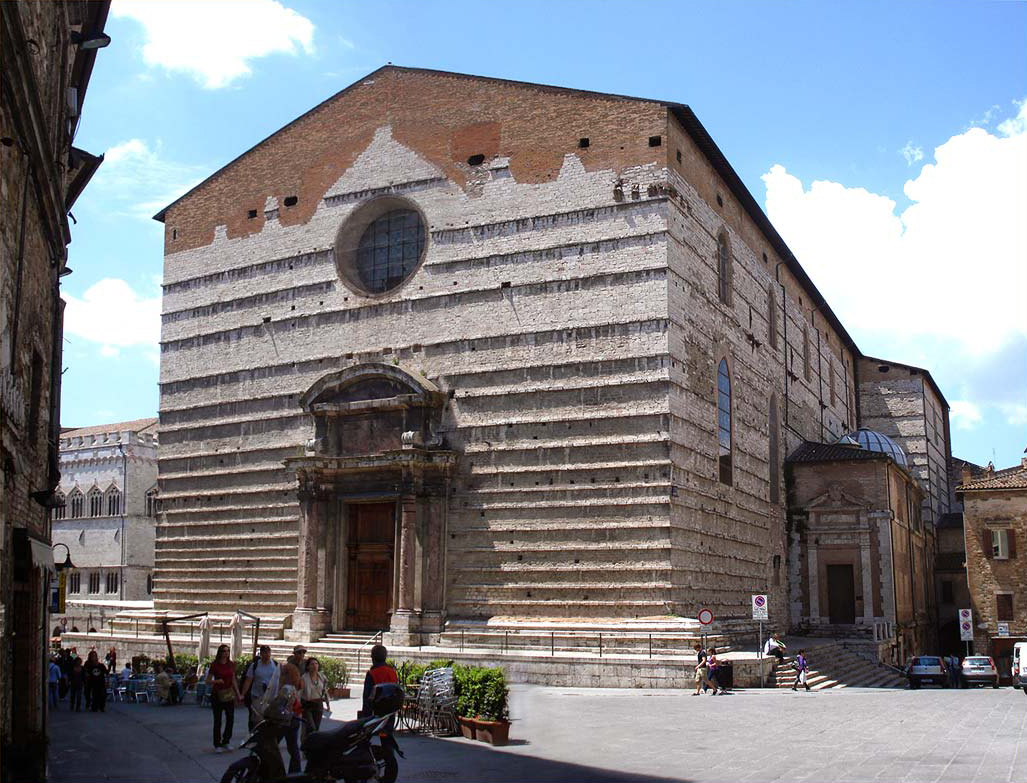
The seat of the Archdiocese of Perugia-Città della Pieve is Cattedrale di S. Lorenzo.

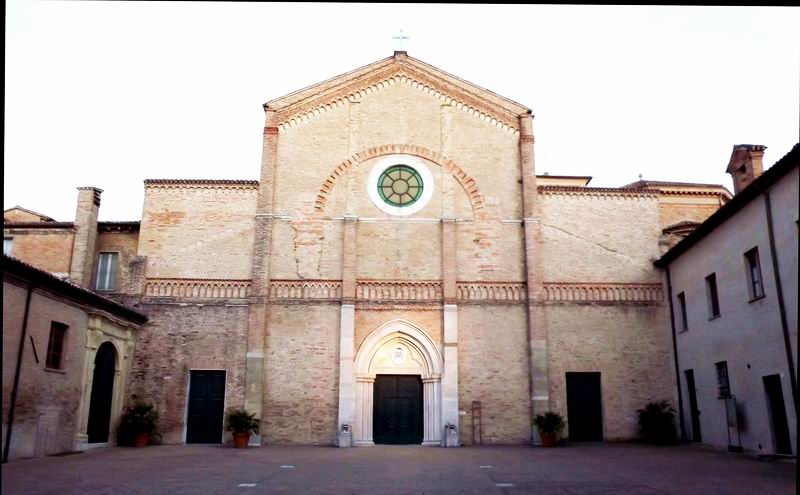
The seat of the Archdiocese of Pesaro is Basilica Cattedrale di S. Maria Assunta.

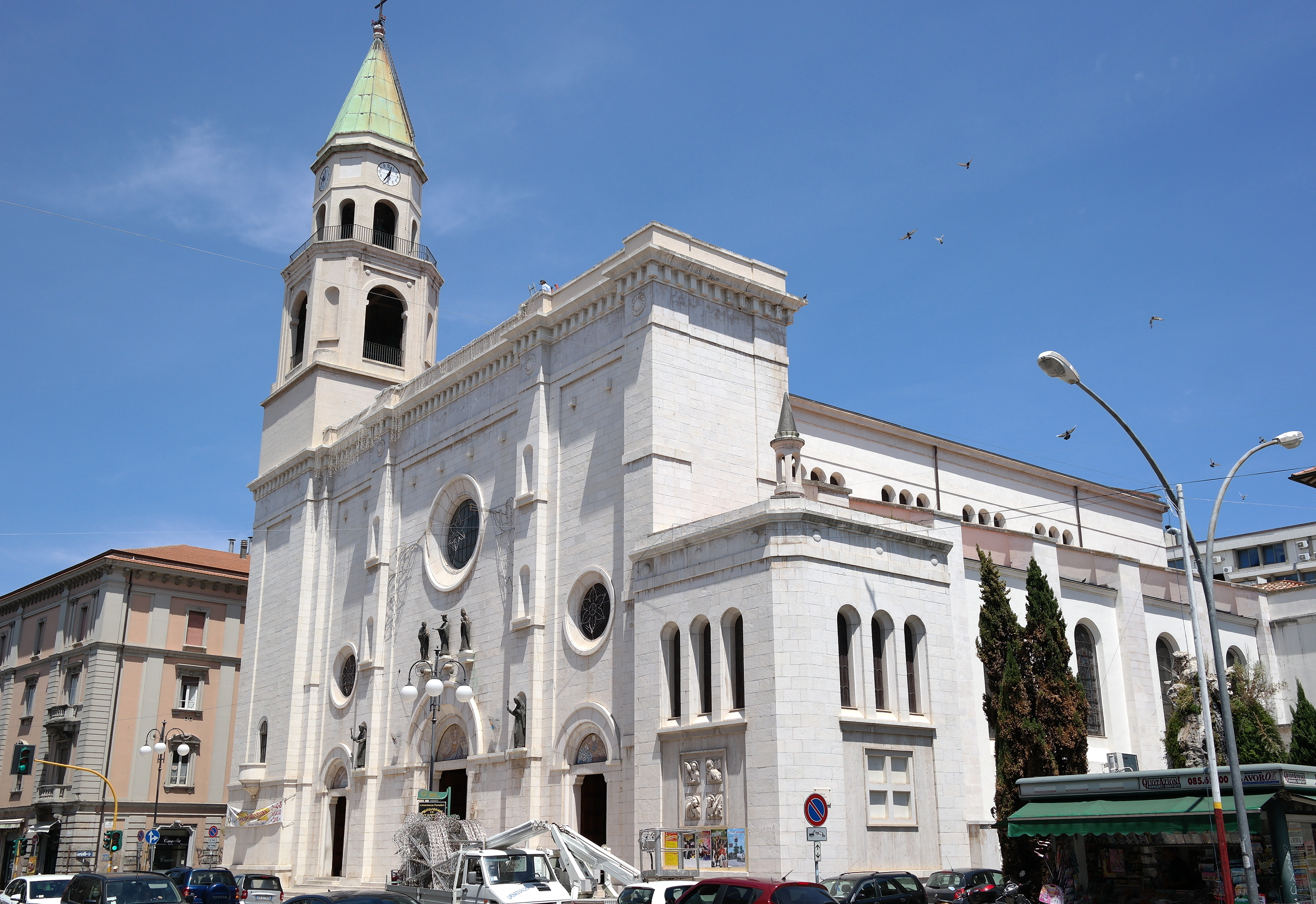
The seat of the Archdiocese of Pescara-Penne is Cattedrale di S. Cetteo Vescovo e Martire.

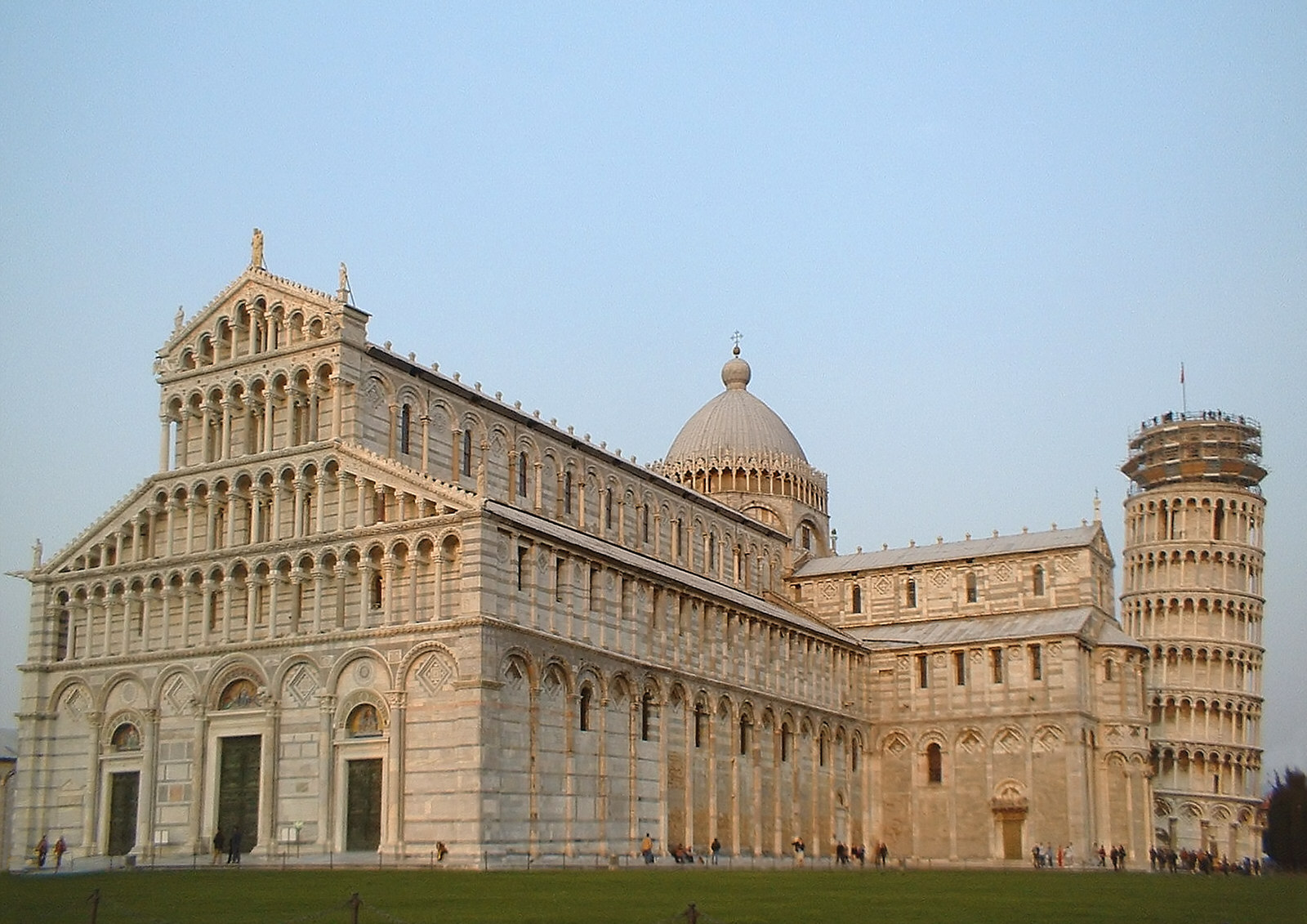
The seat of the Archdiocese of Pisa is Cattedrale di S. Maria Assunta.

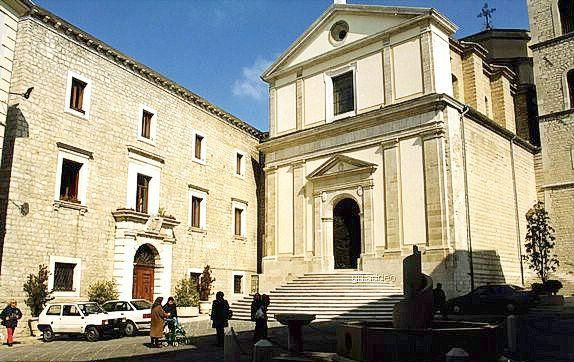
The seat of the Archdiocese of Potenza-Muro Lucano-Marsico Nuovo is Basilica Cattedrale di S. Maria Assunta e S. Gerardo Vescovo.

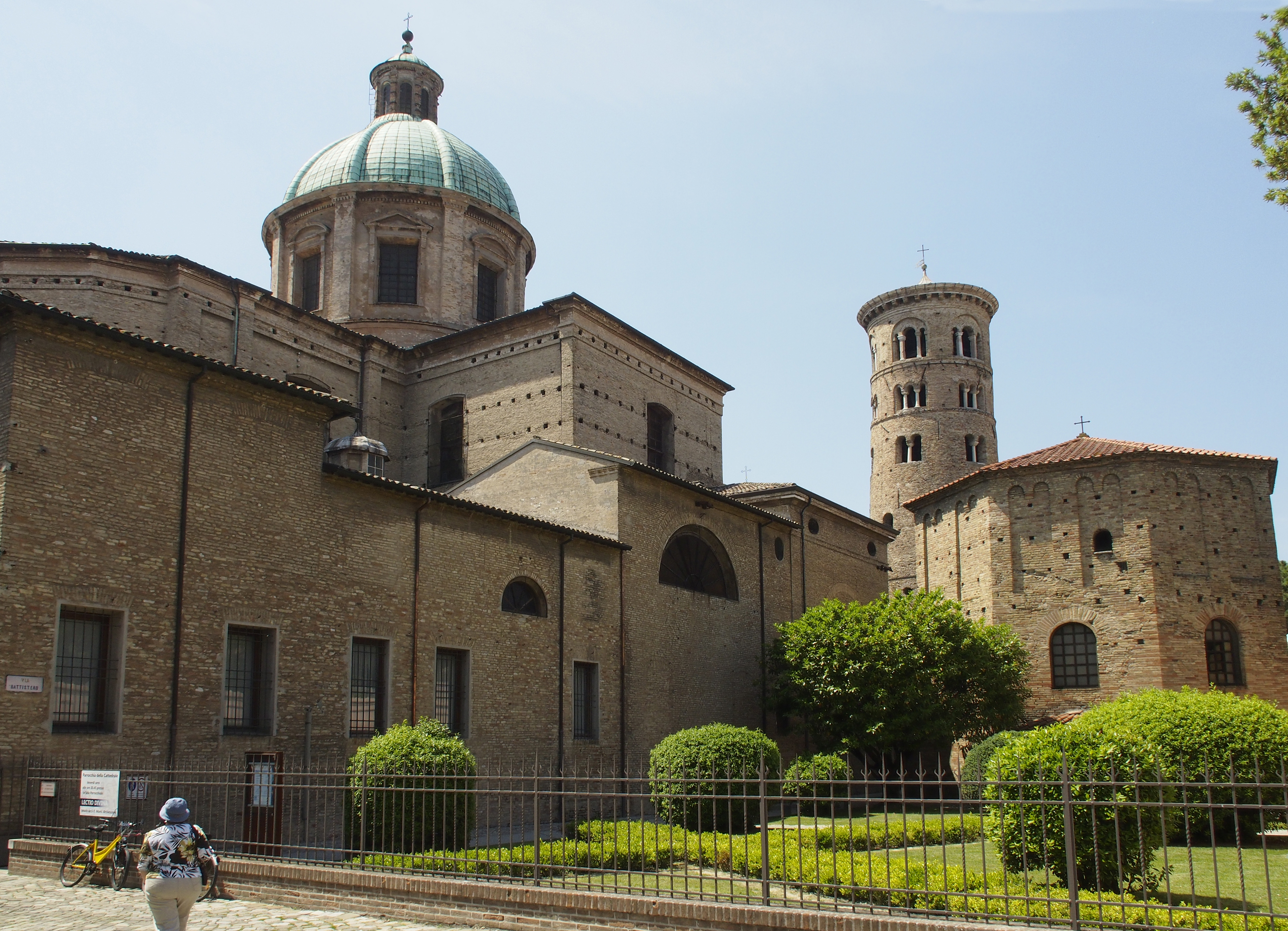
The seat of the Archdiocese of Ravenna-Cervia is Cattedrale di Risurrezione di N.S. Gesù Cristo.

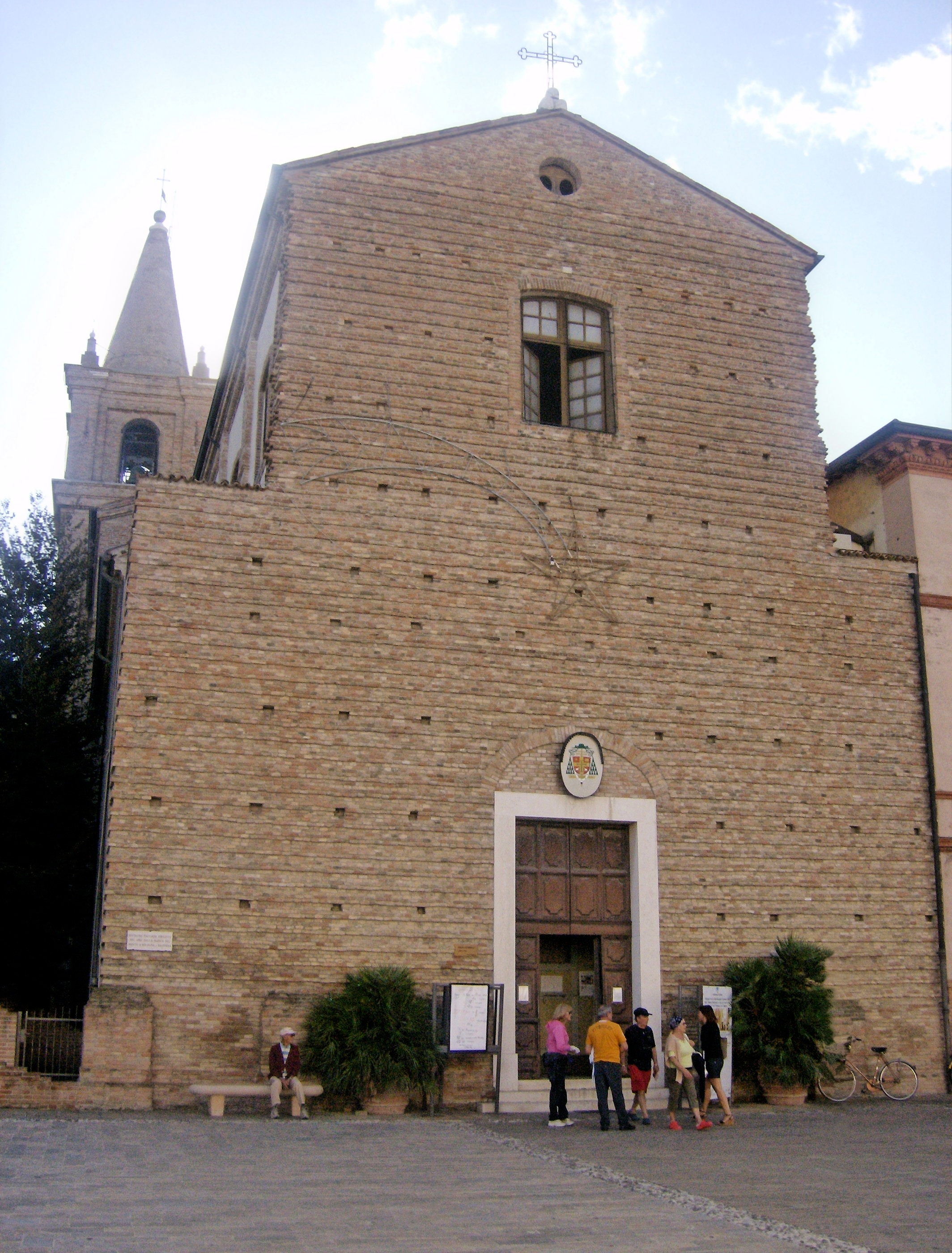
The co-seat of the Archdiocese of Ravenna-Cervia is Cattedrale di S. Pietro(Cervia).

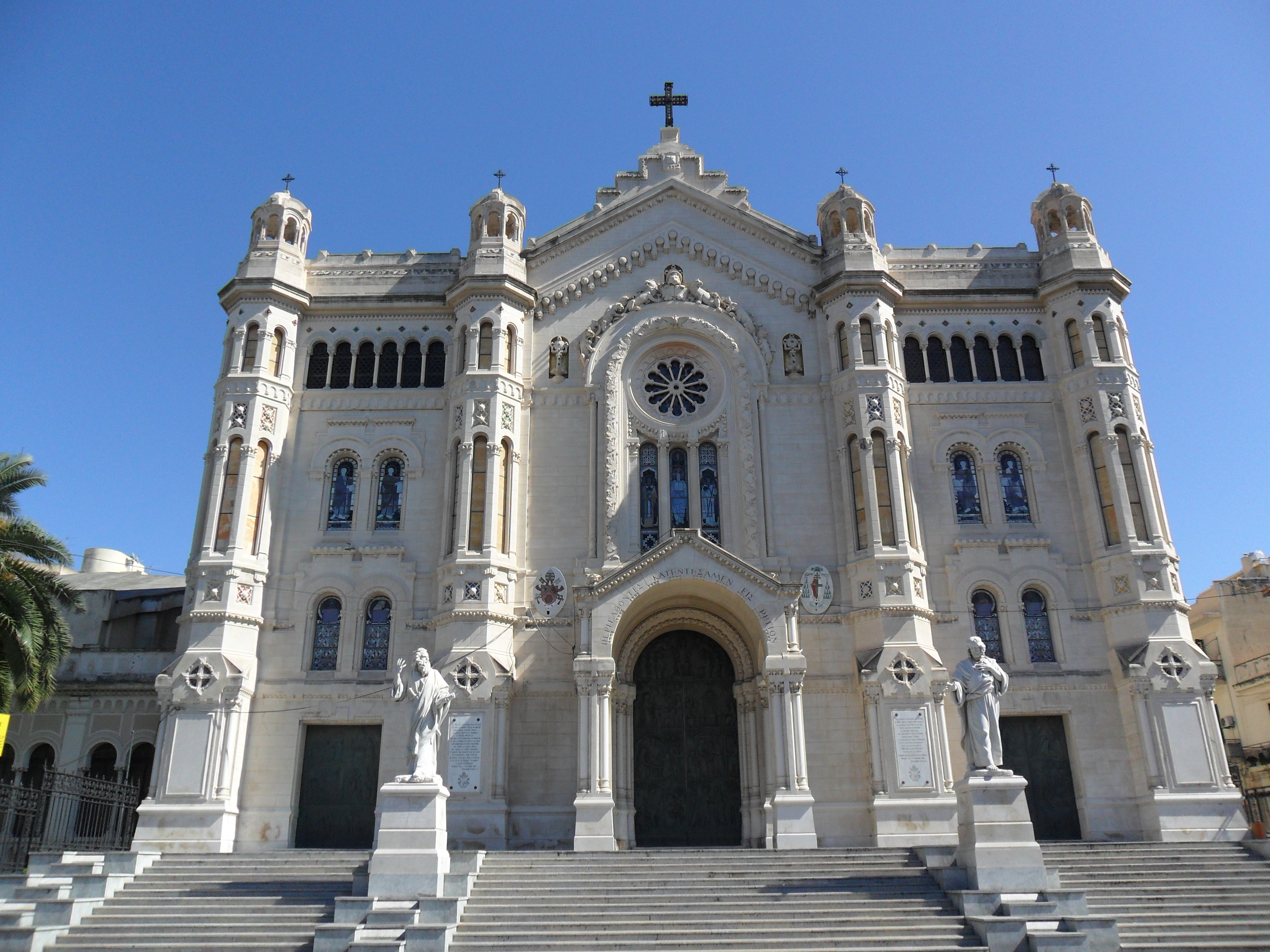
The seat of the Archdiocese of Reggio Calabria-Bova is Basilica Cattedrale di Maria SS. Assunta in Cielo.

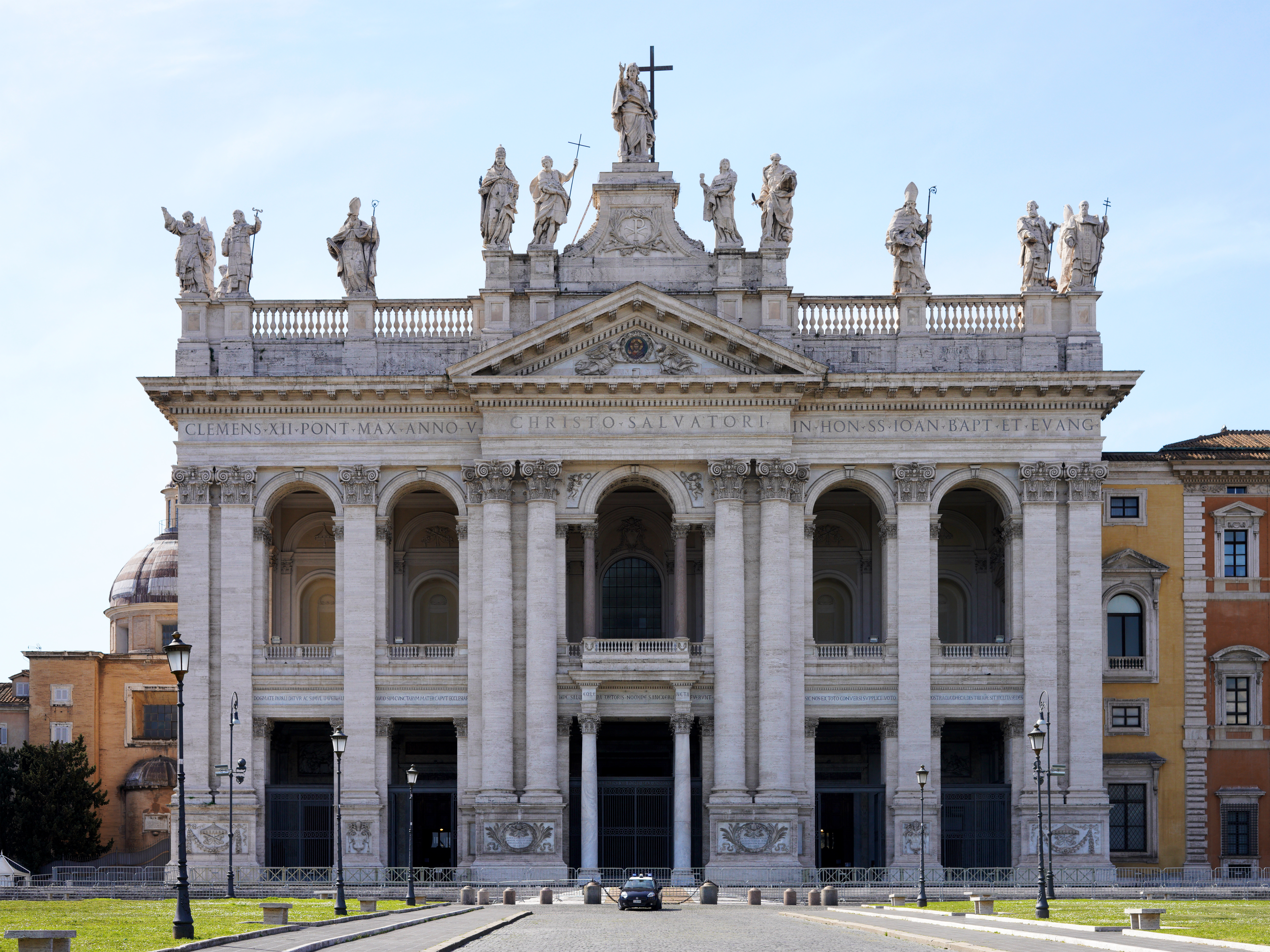
The seat of the Diocese of Rome is Archbasilica of St. John Lateran

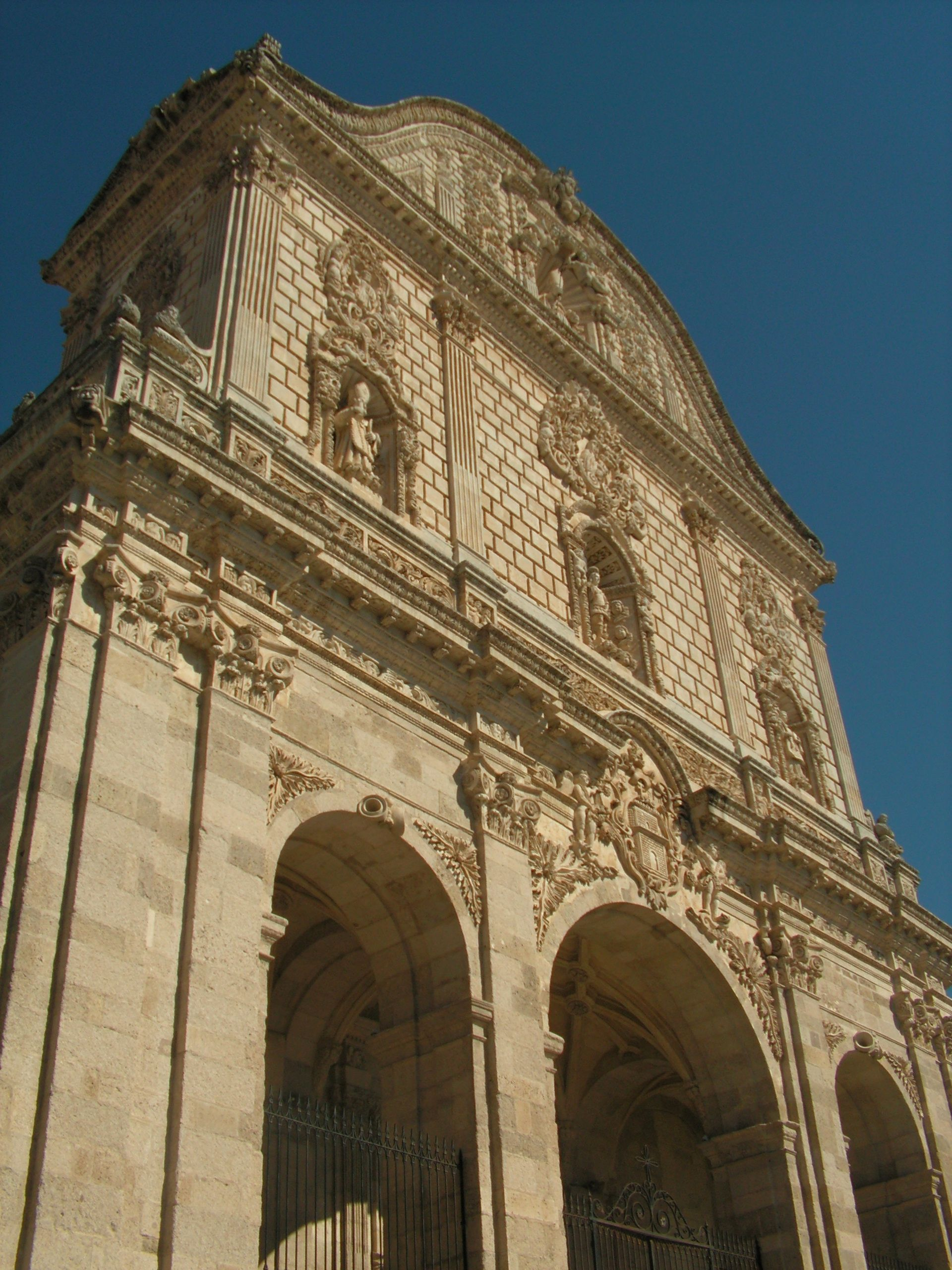
The seat of the Archdiocese of Sassari is Cattedrale di S. Nicola di Bari.

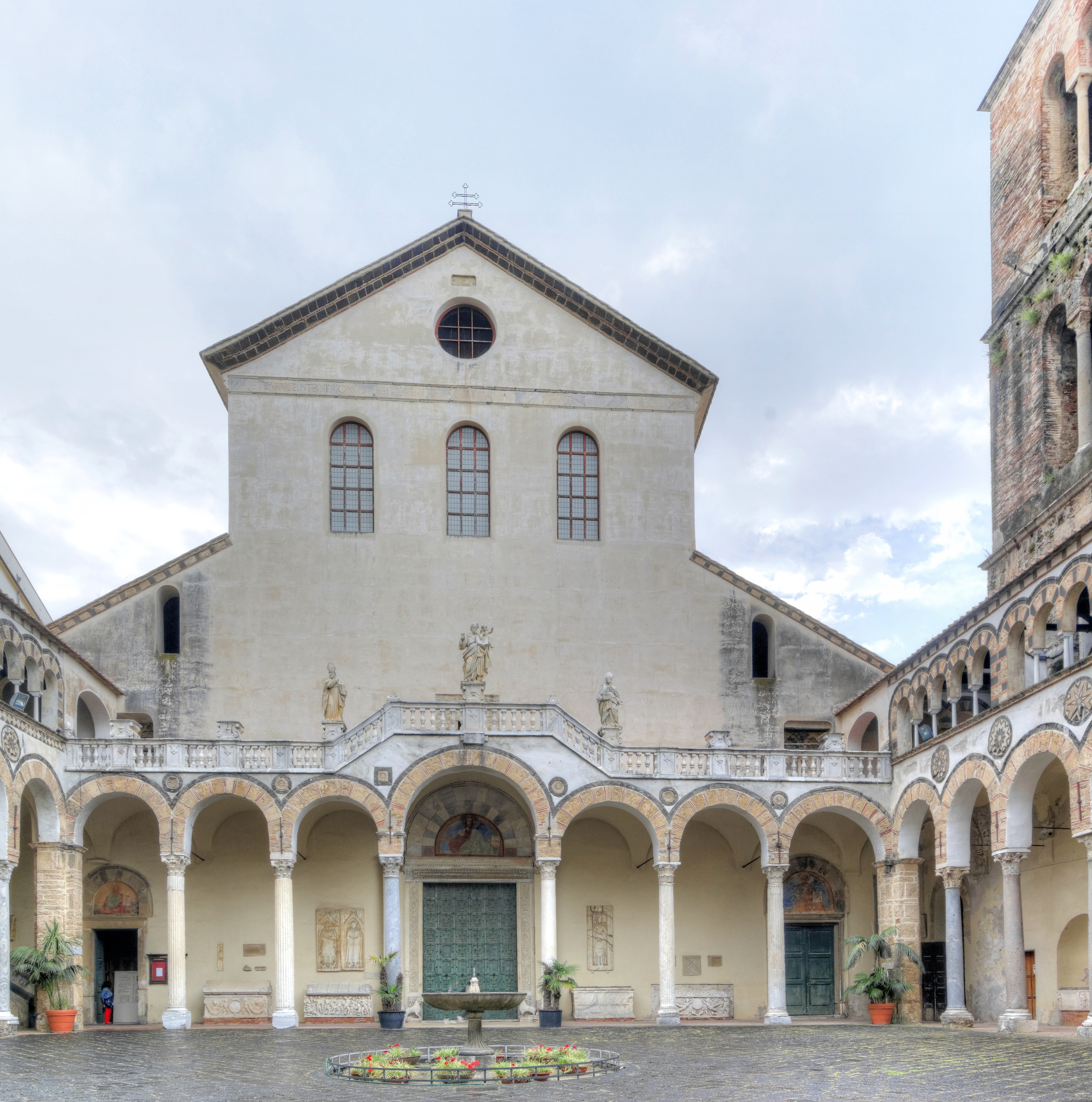
The seat of the Archdiocese of Salerno-Campagna-Acerno is Cattedrale-Basilica di S. Matteo.

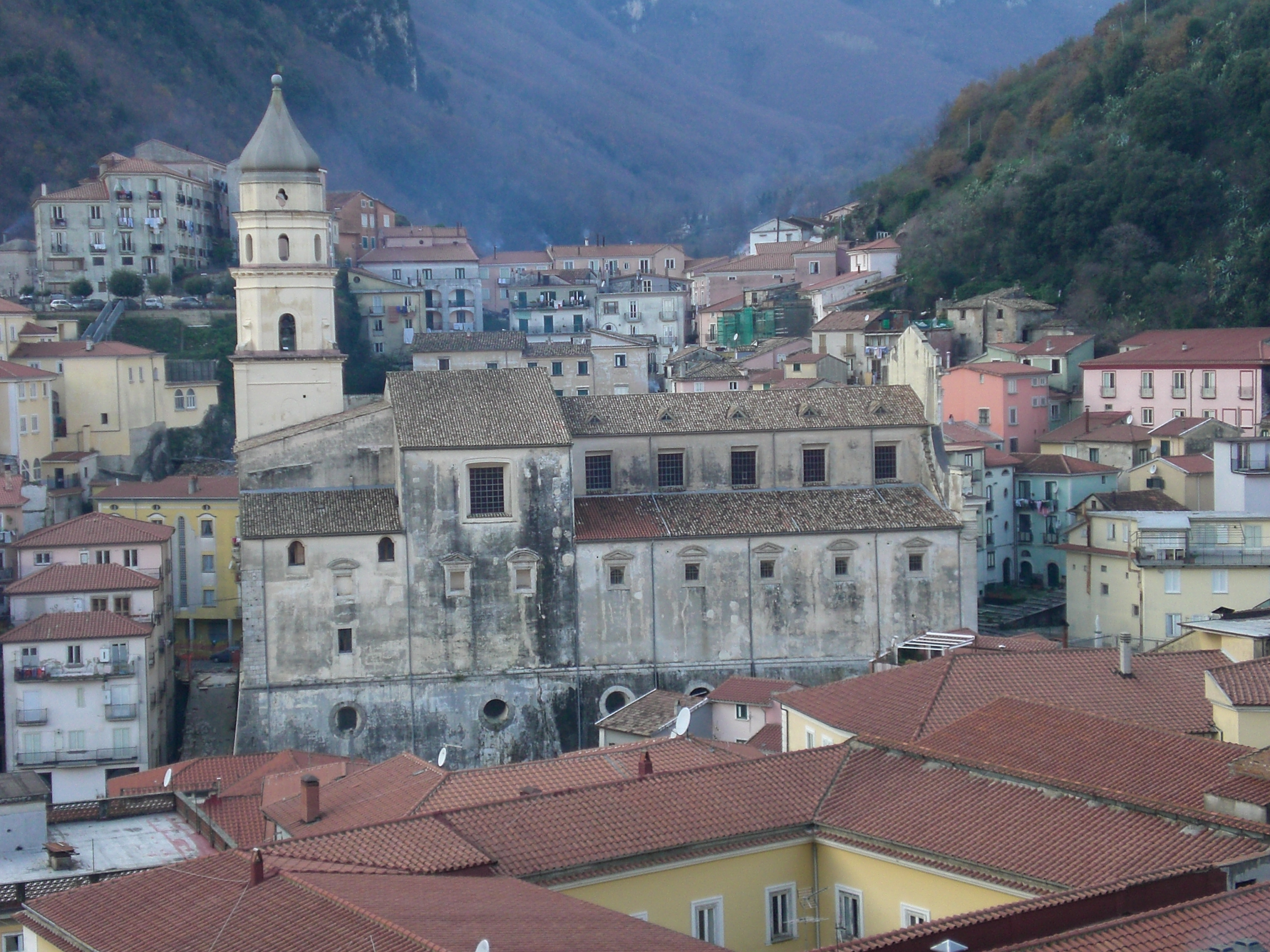
The co-seat of the Archdiocese of Salerno-Campagna-Acerno is Concattedrale-Basilica di S. Maria della Pace(Campagna).

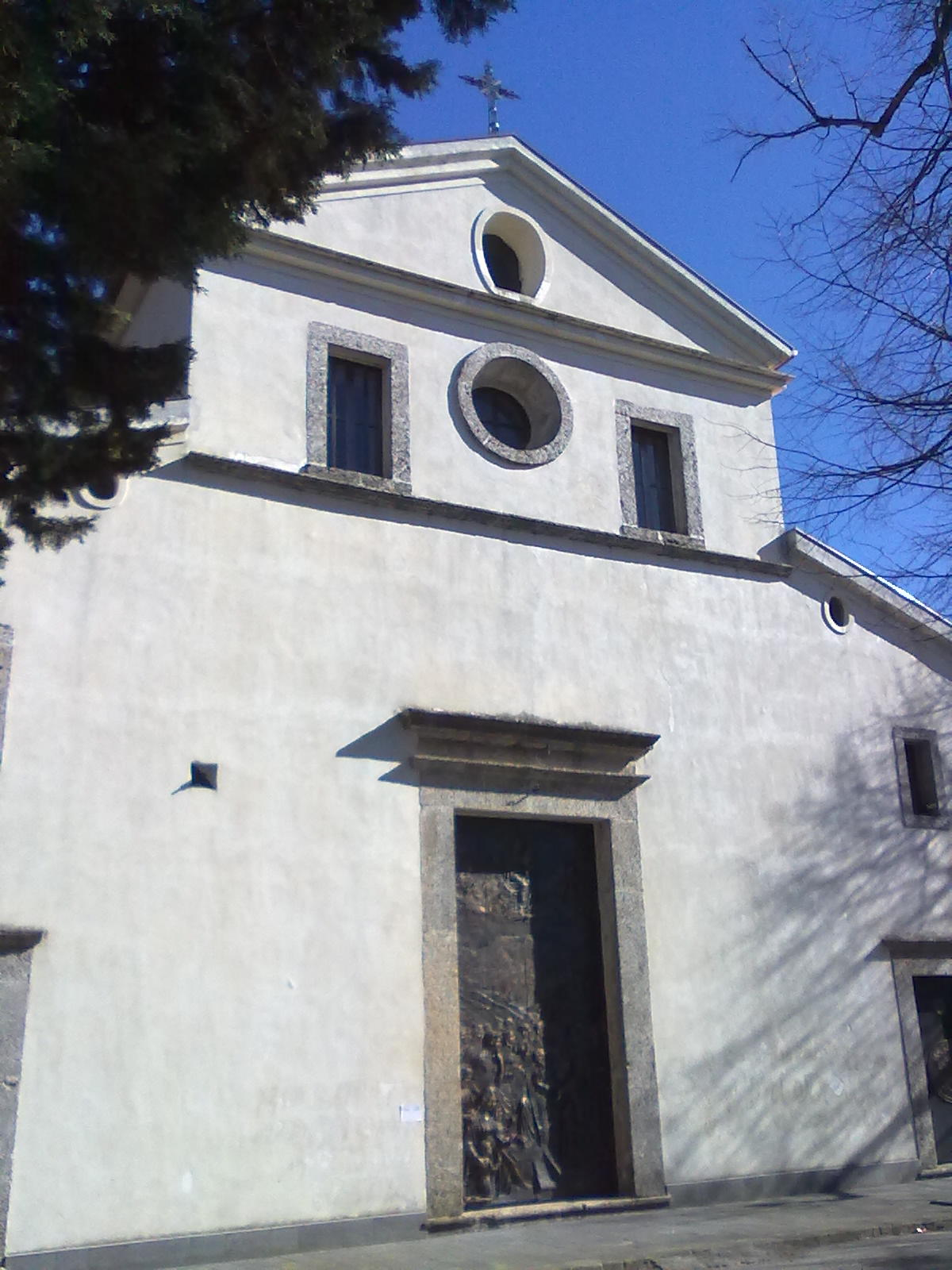
The co-seat of the Archdiocese of Salerno-Campagna-Acerno is Concattedrale di S. Donato(Acerno).

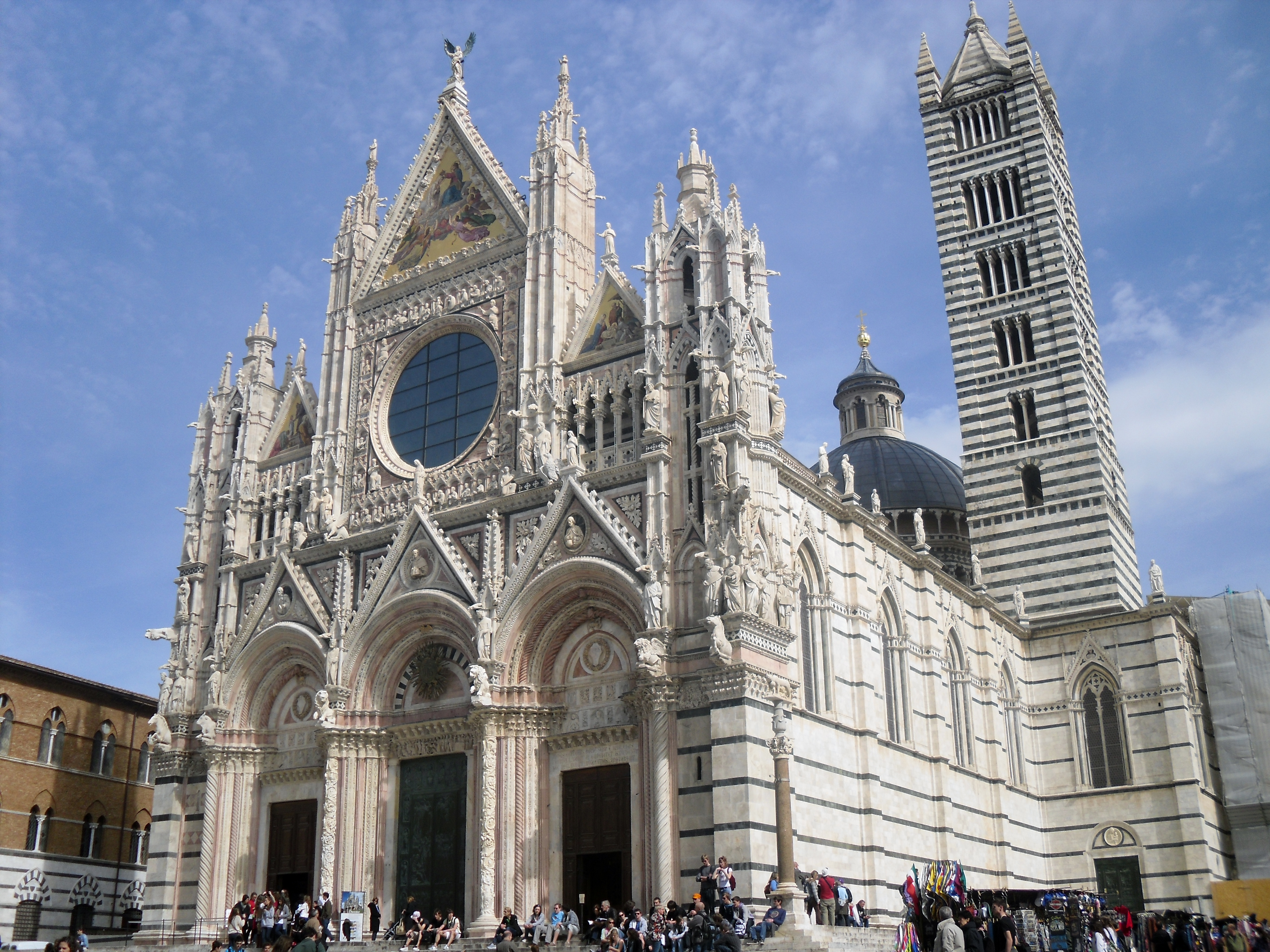
The seat of the Archdiocese of Siena-Colle di Val d'Elsa-Montalcino is Cattedrale di S. Maria Assunta.

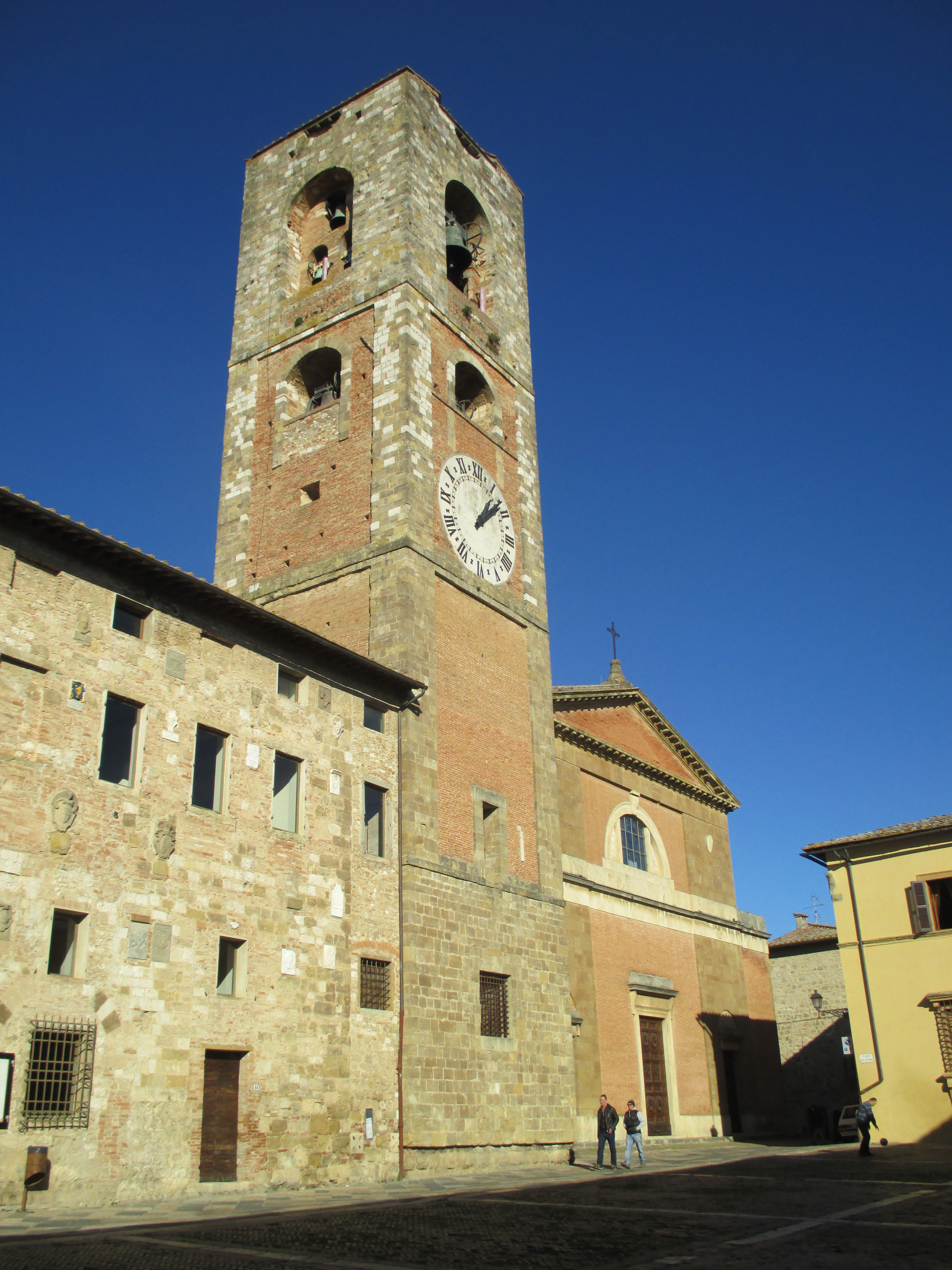
The co-seat of the Archdiocese of Siena-Colle di Val d'Elsa-Montalcino is the Cathedral of Ss. Marziale & Alberto.

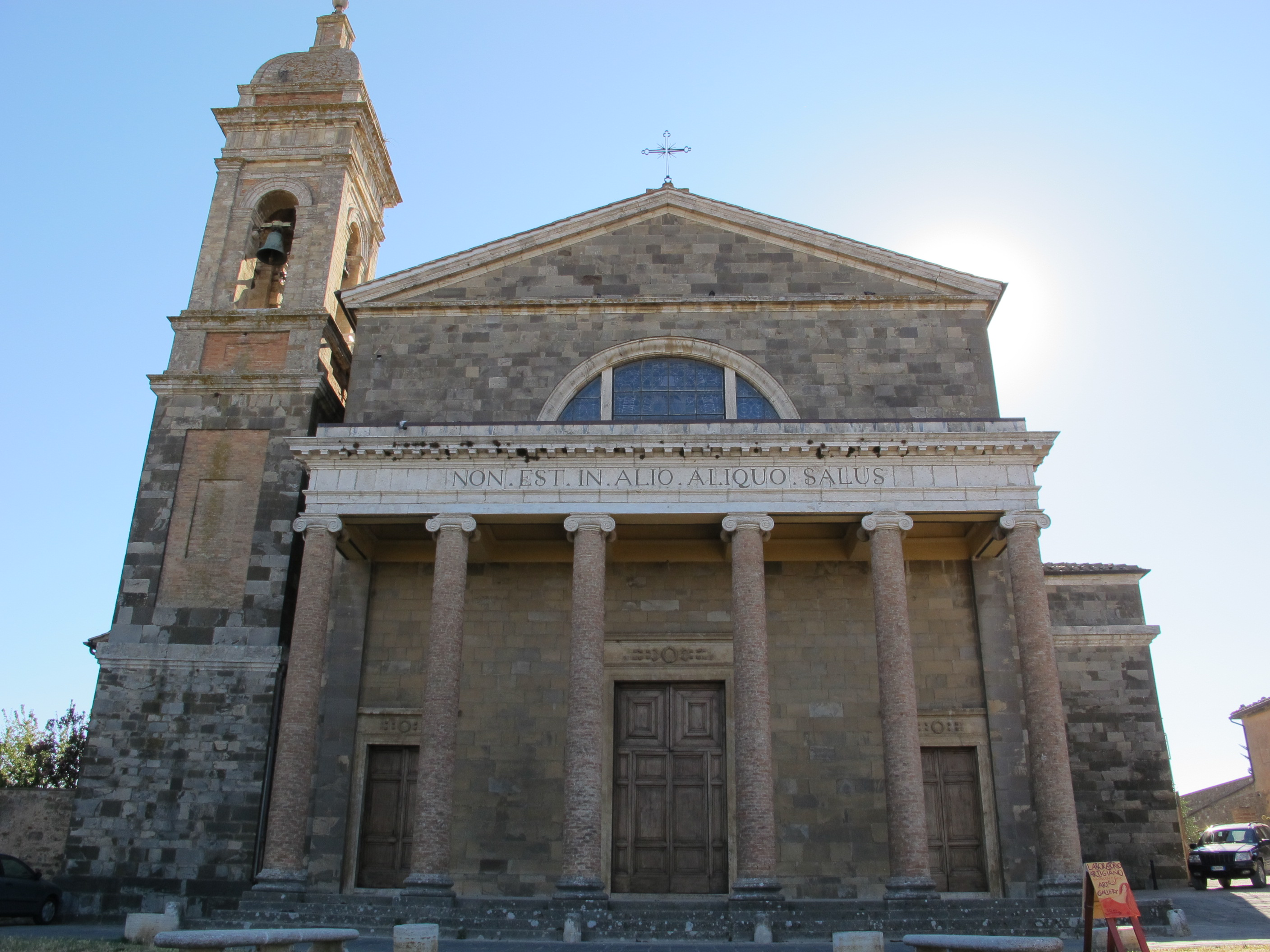
The co-seat of the Archdiocese of Siena-Colle di Val d'Elsa-Montalcino is Concattedrale di S. Salvatore(Montalcino).

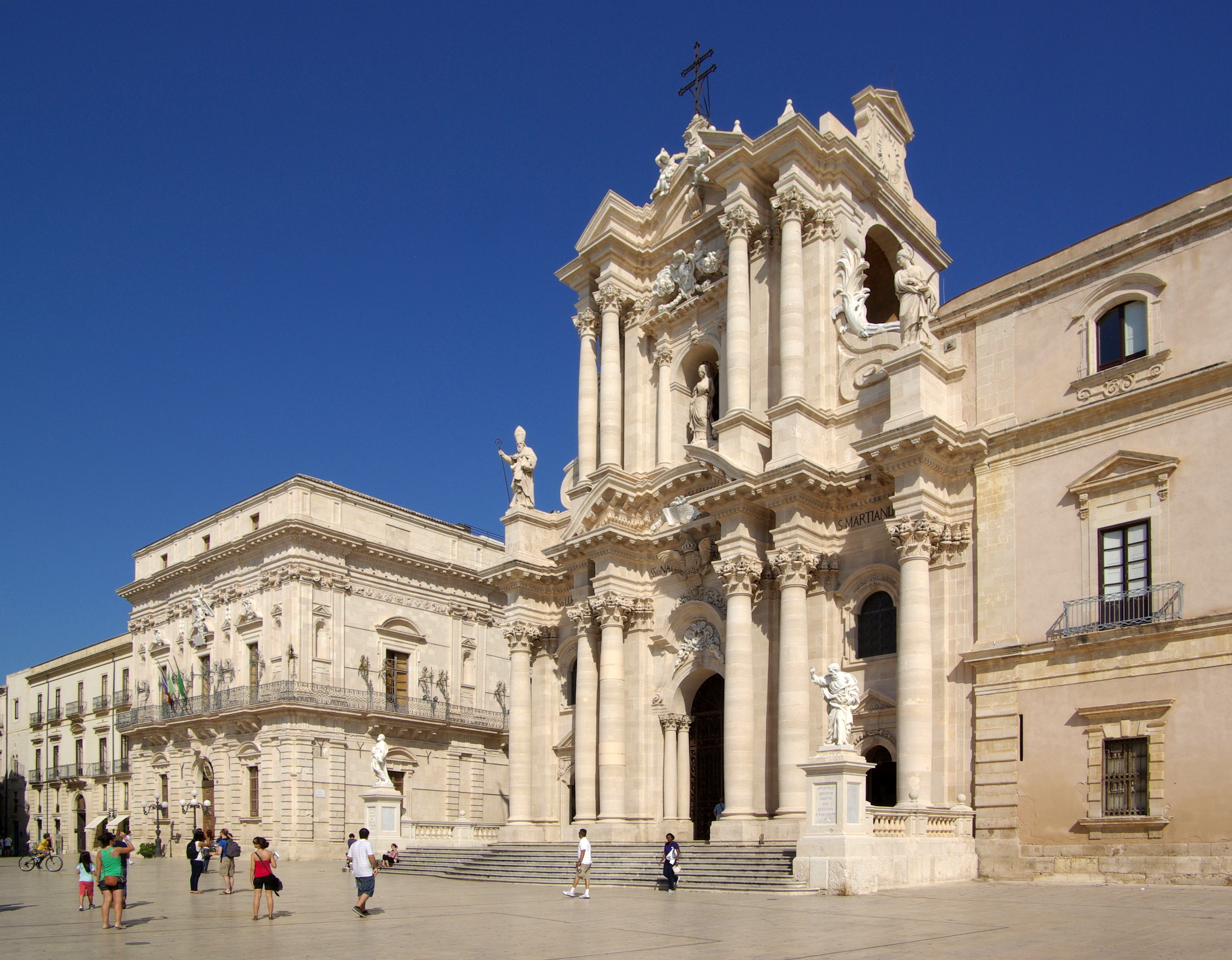
The seat of the Archdiocese of Siracusa is the Cathedral of the Nativity of Mary Most Holy.

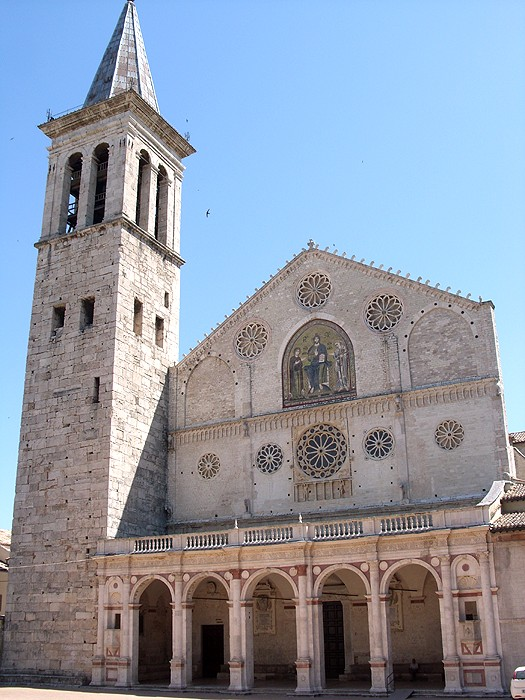
The seat of the Archdiocese of Spoleto-Norcia is Cattedrale di Santa Maria Assunta.

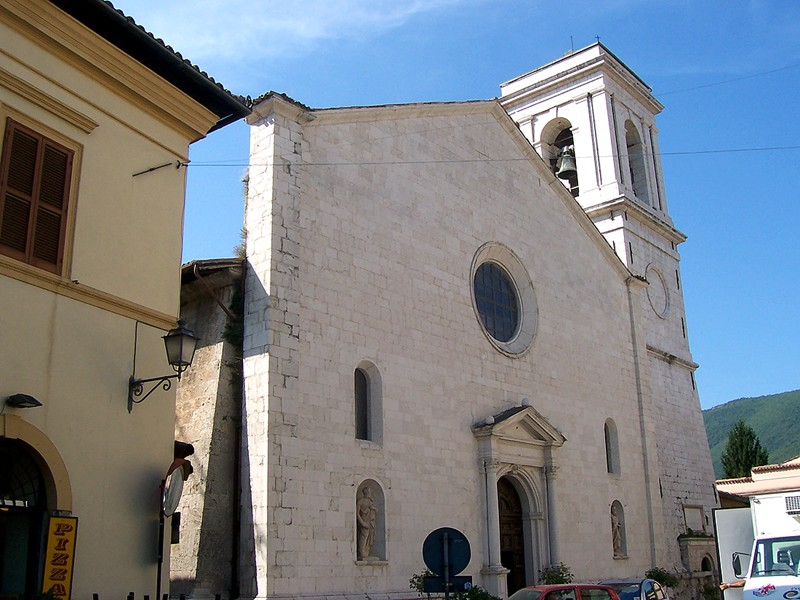
The co-seat of the Archdiocese of Spoleto-Norcia is Concattedrale di S. Maria Argentea(Norcia).

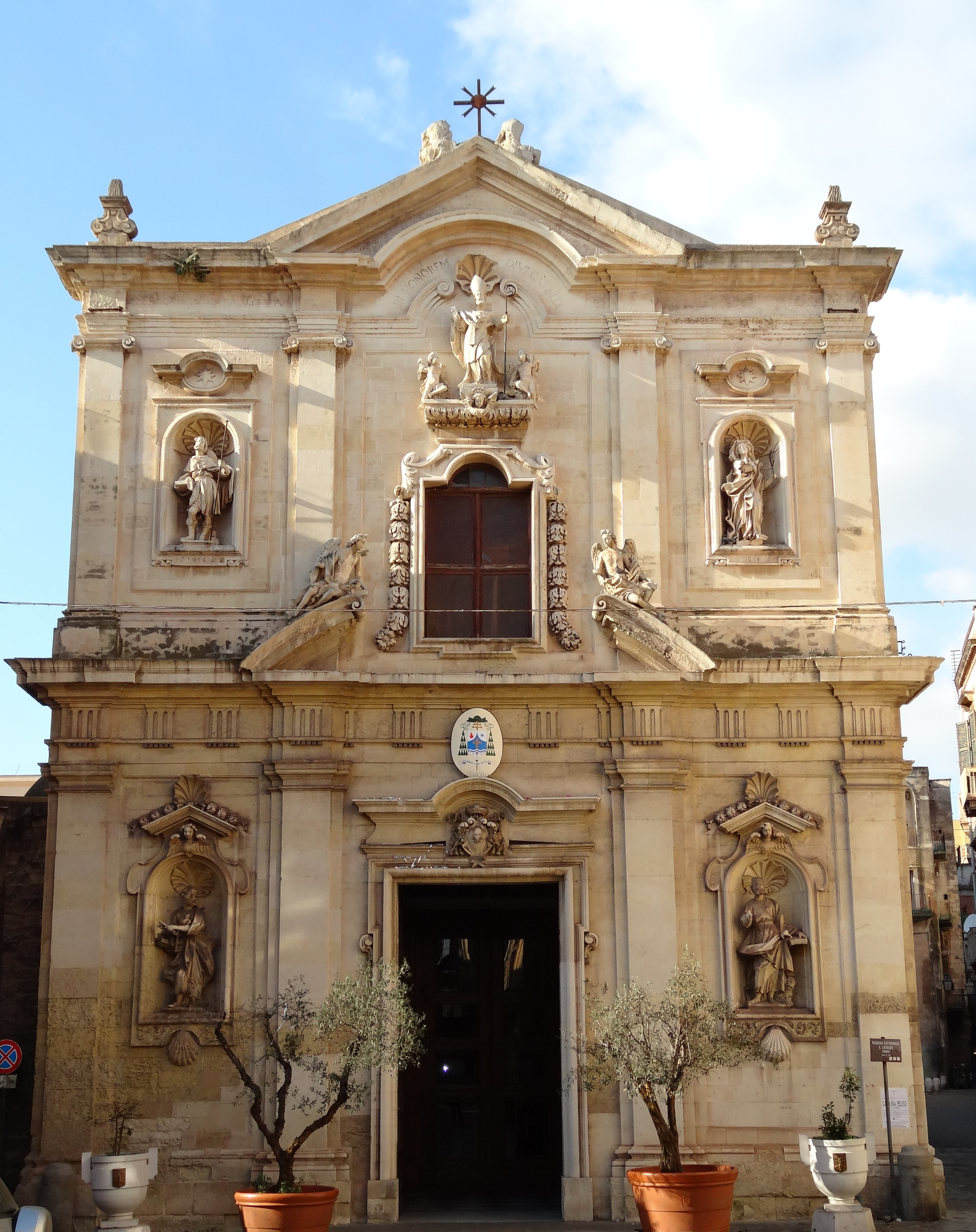
The seat of the Archdiocese of Taranto is Basilica Cattedrale di S. Cataldo.

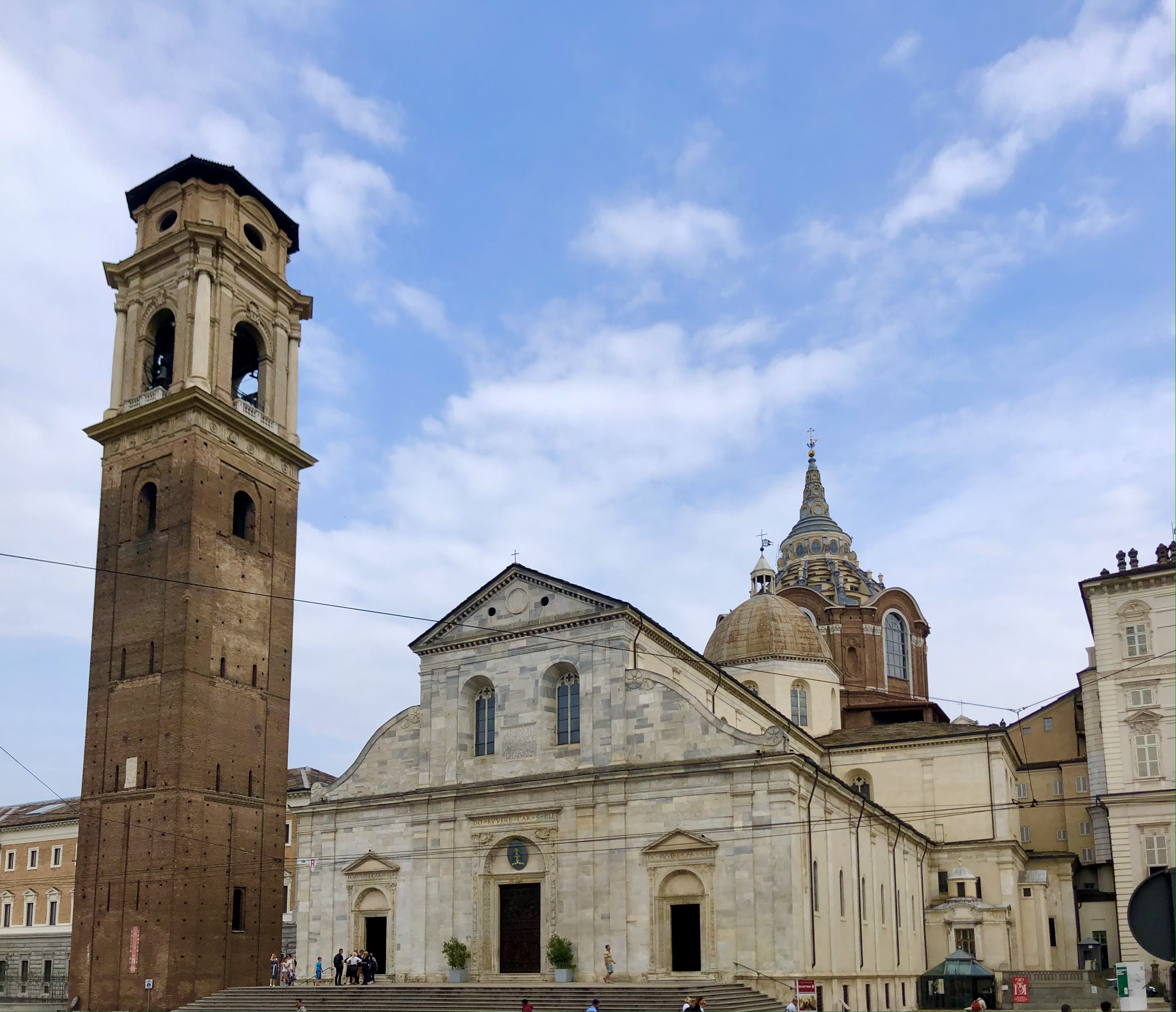
The seat of the Archdiocese of Turin is Cattedrale Metropolitana di S. Giovanni Battista.

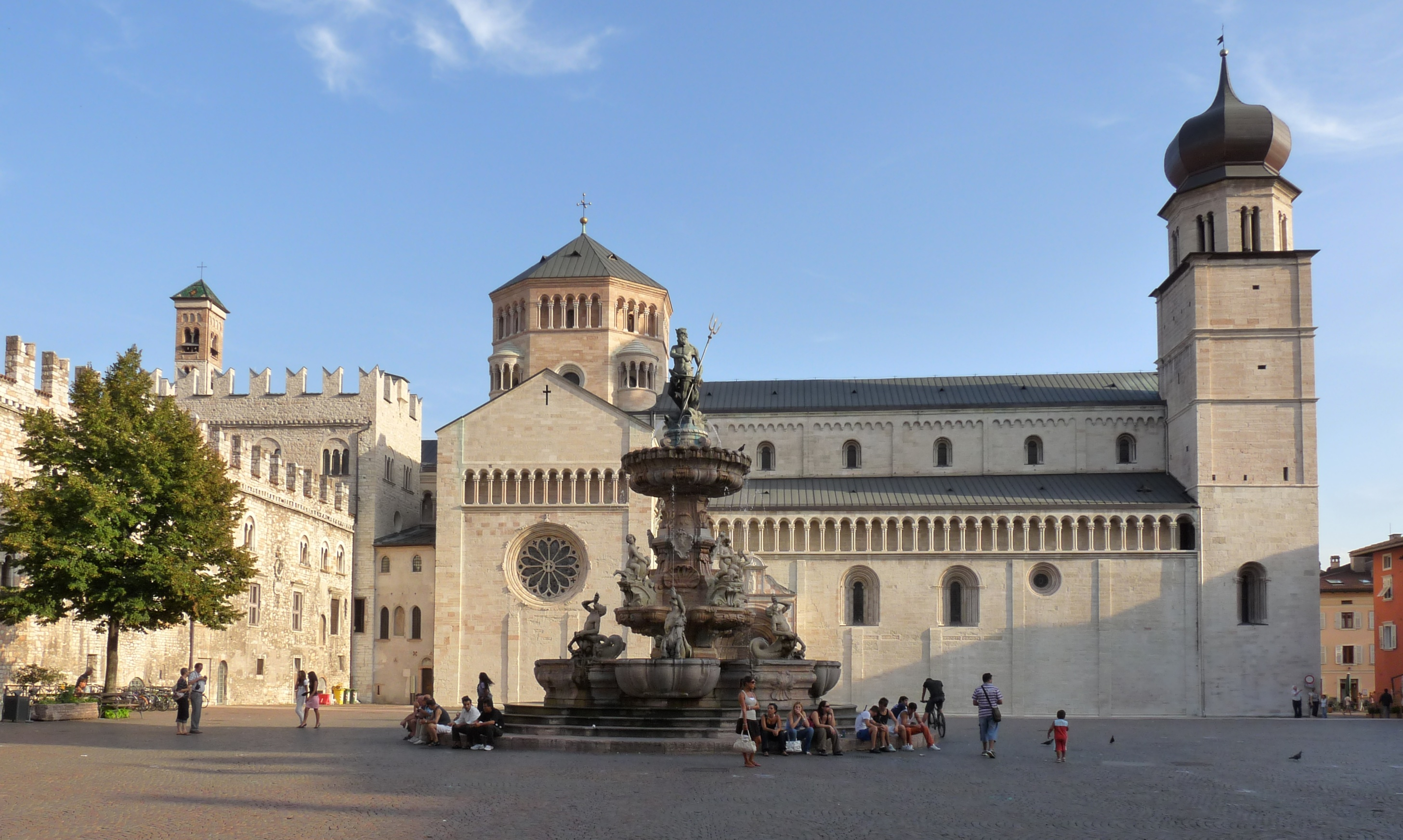
The seat of the Archdiocese of Trento is Basilica Cattedrale di S. Vigilio Vescovo.

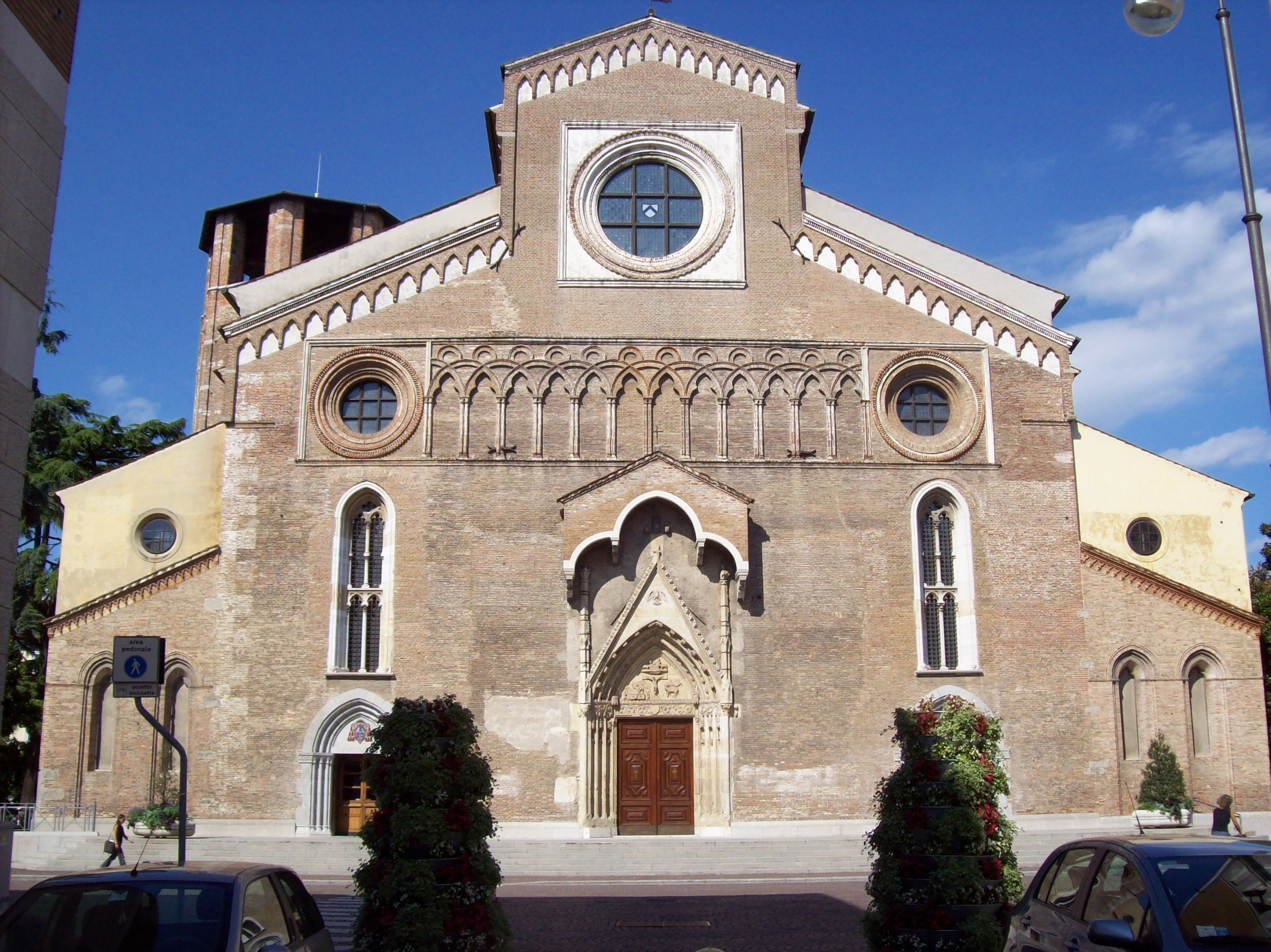
The seat of the Archdiocese of Udine is Cattedrale Metropolitana di S. Maria Annunziata.

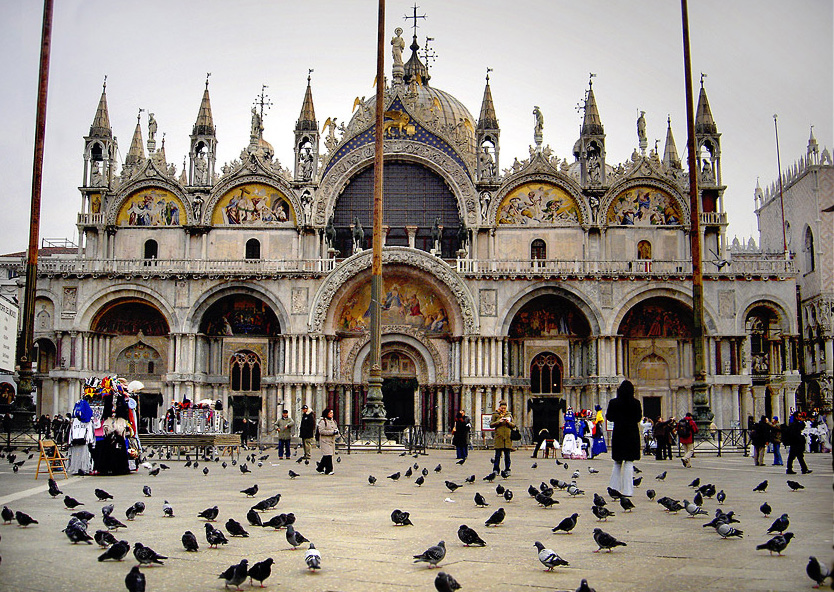
The seat of the Archdiocese of Venice is Basilica Cattedrale Patriachale di S. Marco.

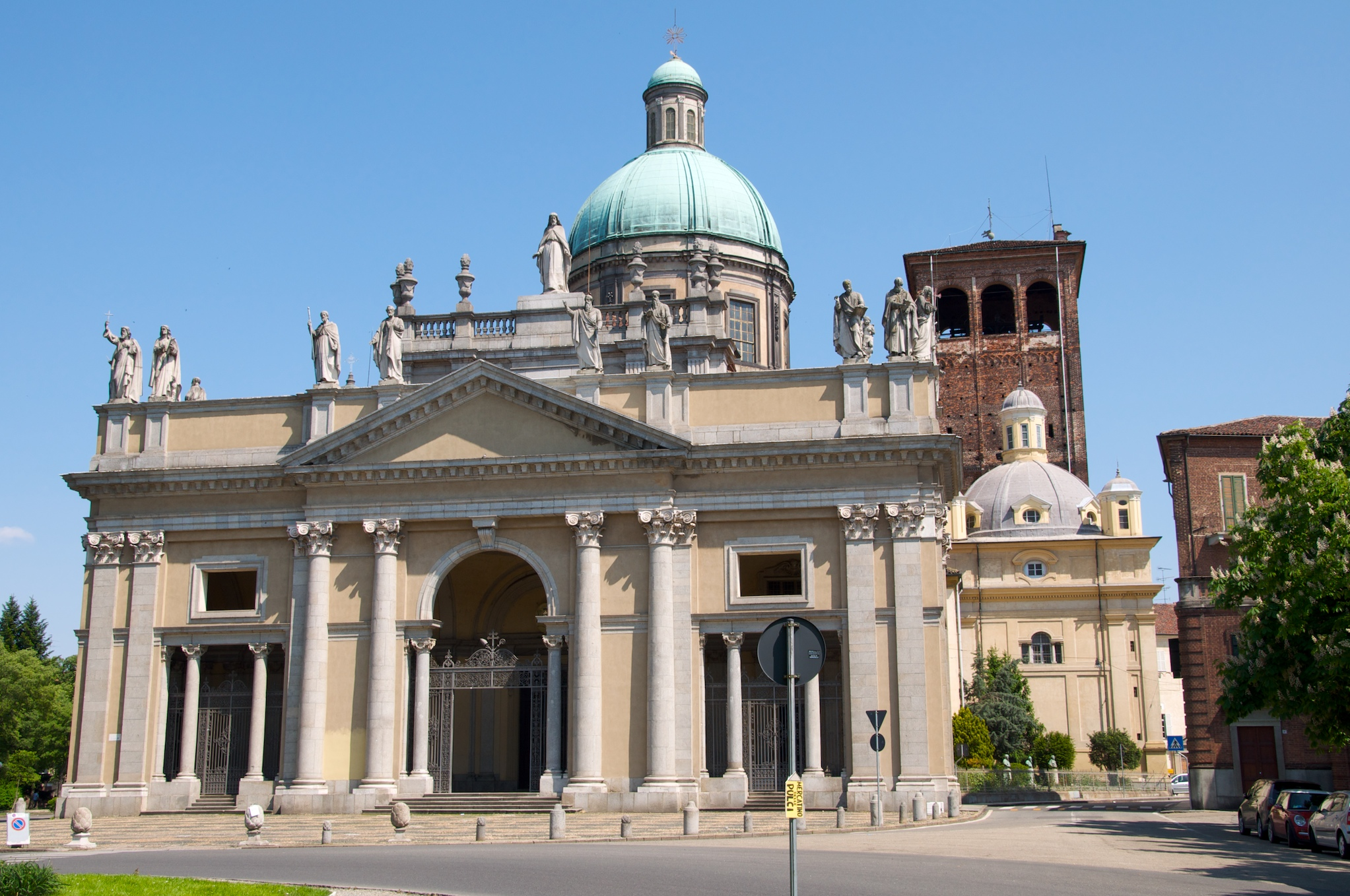
The seat of the Archdiocese of Vercelli is Cattedrale-Basilica di S. Eusebio.

== See also ==
- Episcopal Conference of Italy
- List of Catholic dioceses (structured view)
- List of cathedrals in Italy

== Sources and external links ==
- GCatholic - Italy
- GCatholic - Former and/or titular sees in Italy
- Catholic Hierarchy Profile of the Catholic Church in Italy
