= Decorum =

Principle of classical rhetoric, poetry, and theatrical theory

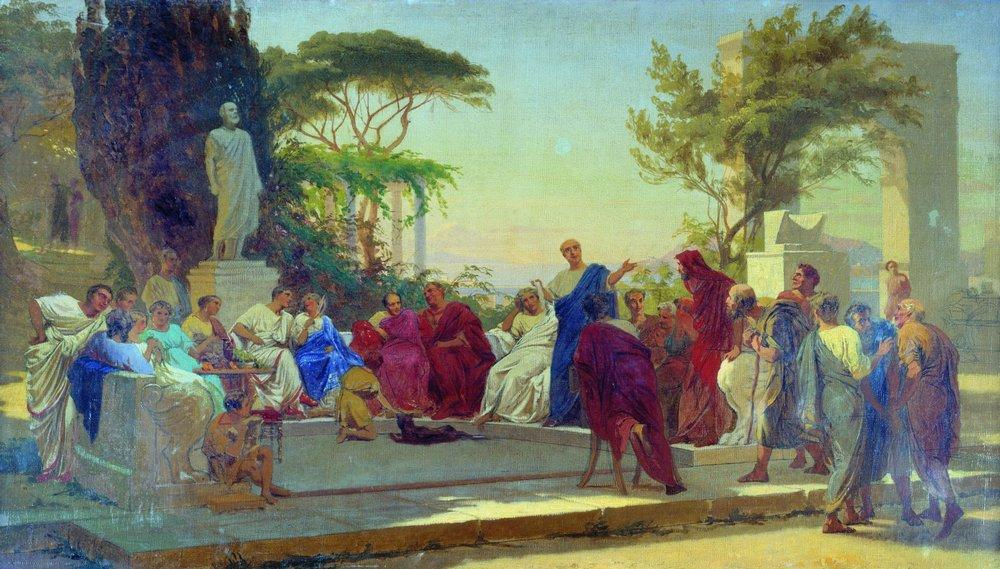
Poetry reading by Horace, an early advocate of decorum. Painting by Fyodor Bronnikov

Decorum (from the Latin: "right, proper") was a principle of classical rhetoric, poetry, and theatrical theory concerning the fitness or otherwise of a style to a theatrical subject. The concept of decorum is also applied to prescribed limits of appropriate social behavior within set situations.

== In rhetoric and poetry ==
In classical rhetoric and poetic theory, decorum designates the appropriateness of style to subject. Both Aristotle (in, for example, his Poetics) and Horace (in his Ars Poetica) discussed the importance of appropriate style in epic, tragedy, comedy, etc. Horace says, for example: "A comic subject is not susceptible of treatment in a tragic style, and similarly the banquet of Thyestes cannot be fitly described in the strains of everyday life or in those that approach the tone of comedy. Let each of these styles be kept to the role properly allotted to it."

Hellenistic and Latin rhetors divided style into the grand style, the middle style, and the low (or plain) style. Certain types of vocabulary and diction were considered appropriate for each stylistic register. A discussion of this division of styles was set out in the pseudo-Ciceronian Rhetorica ad Herennium. Modeled on Virgil's three-part literary career (Bucolics, Georgics, Aeneid), ancient, medieval, and Renaissance theorists often linked each style to a specific genre: epic (high style), didactic (middle style), and pastoral (plain style). In the Middle Ages, this concept was called "Virgil's wheel".

For stylistic purists, the mixing of styles within a work was considered inappropriate, and a consistent use of the high style was mandated for the epic. However, stylistic diversity had been a hallmark of classical epic (as seen in the inclusion of comic and/or erotic scenes in the epics of Virgil or Homer). Poetry, perhaps more than any other literary form, usually expressed words or phrases that were not current in ordinary conversation, characterized as poetic diction.

With the arrival of Christianity, concepts of decorum became enmeshed with those of the sacred and profane in a different way than in the previous classical religions. Although in the Middle Ages religious subjects were often treated with broad humour in a "low" manner, especially in medieval drama, the churches policed carefully the treatment in more permanent art forms, insisting on a consistent "high style". By the Renaissance the mixture of revived classical mythology and Christian subjects was also considered to fall under the heading of decorum, as was the trend of mixing religious subjects in art with lively genre painting or portraiture of the fashionable. The Catholic Council of Trent specifically forbade, among other things, the "indecorous" in religious art.

Concepts of decorum, increasingly sensed as inhibitive and stultifying, were aggressively attacked and deconstructed by writers of the Modernist movement, with the result that readers' expectations were no longer based on decorum, and in consequence the violations of decorum that underlie the wit of mock-heroic, of literary burlesque, and even a sense of bathos, were dulled in the twentieth-century reader.

== In theatre ==
In continental European debates on theatre in the Renaissance and post-Renaissance, decorum concerns the appropriateness of certain actions or events to the stage. In their emulation of classical models and of the theoretical works by Aristotle and Horace (including the notion of the "Three Unities"), certain subjects were deemed to be better left to narration. In Horace's Ars Poetica, the poet (in addition to speaking about appropriate vocabulary and diction, as discussed above) counseled playwrights to respect decorum by avoiding the portrayal, on stage, of scenes that would shock the audience by their cruelty or unbelievable nature: "But you will not bring on to the stage anything that ought properly to be taking place behinds the scenes, and you will keep out of sight many episodes that are to be described later by the eloquent tongue of a narrator. Medea must not butcher her children in the presence of the audience, nor the monstrous Atreus cook his dish of human flesh within public view, nor Procne be metamorphosed into a bird, nor Cadmus into a snake. I shall turn in disgust from anything of this kind that you show me."

In Renaissance Italy, important debates on decorum in theater were prompted by Sperone Speroni's play Canace (portraying incest between a brother and sister) and Giovanni Battista Giraldi's play Orbecche (involving patricide and cruel scenes of vengeance). In seventeenth-century France, the notion of decorum (les bienséances) was a key component of French classicism in both theater and the novel, as well as the visual arts.

== Social decorum ==
Social decorum sets down appropriate social behavior and propriety, and is thus linked to notions of courtesy, decency, etiquette, grace, manners, respect, and seemliness.

The precepts of social decorum as we understand them, as the preservation of external decency, were consciously set by Lord Chesterfield, who was looking for a translation of les moeurs: "Manners are too little, morals are too much." The word decorum survives in Chesterfield's severely reduced form as an element of etiquette: the prescribed limits of appropriate social behavior within a set situation. The use of this word in this sense is of the sixteenth-century, prescribing the boundaries established in drama and literature, used by Roger Ascham, The Scholemaster (1570) and echoed in Malvolio's tirade in Twelfth Night, "My masters, are you mad, or what are you? Have you no wit, manners nor honesty, but to gabble like tinkers at this time of night?... Is there no respect of persons, place nor time in you?"

The place of decorum in the courtroom, of the type of argument that is within bounds, remains pertinent: the decorum of argument was a frequent topic during the O.J. Simpson trial.

During Model United Nations conferences the honorable chair may have to announce, "Decorum delegates!" if delegates are not adhering to parliamentary procedure dictated by the rules. This often happens if a delegate speaks out of turn or if the delegation is being disruptive.
