= Molin (surname) =

Molin is a surname. Notable people with the surname include:

- Adrian Molin (1880–1942), Swedish far-right writer and political activist
- Bud Molin (Henry David Molin, 1925–2007), American film editor and television director
- Emil Molin (born 1993), Swedish ice hockey player
- Federico Maria Molin (1753–1819), Catholic prelate who served as Bishop of Adria
- Francesco Molin (1575–1655), Doge of Venice
- Johan Molin (born 1976), Swedish ice hockey player
- Julia Molin (born 1990), Swedish footballer
- Lars Molin (disambiguation), multiple people
- Magnus Molin (born 1979), Swedish table tennis player
- Nicolò Molin (1562–1608), Venetian diplomat
- Ove Molin (born 1971), Swedish ice hockey player
- Paolo Dal Molin (born 1987), Italian track and field athlete
- Raffaele Molin (1825–87), Italian physician, geologist and zoologist (ichthyologist and parasitologist)

== See also ==
- Paolo Dal Molin (b. 1987), Italian athlete
- Tommaso Dal Molin (1902–1930), Italian aviator
