= Filippo della Torre =

Italian humanist, antiquarian and Roman Catholic prelate

Most Reverend Filippo della Torre
- Bishop of Adria
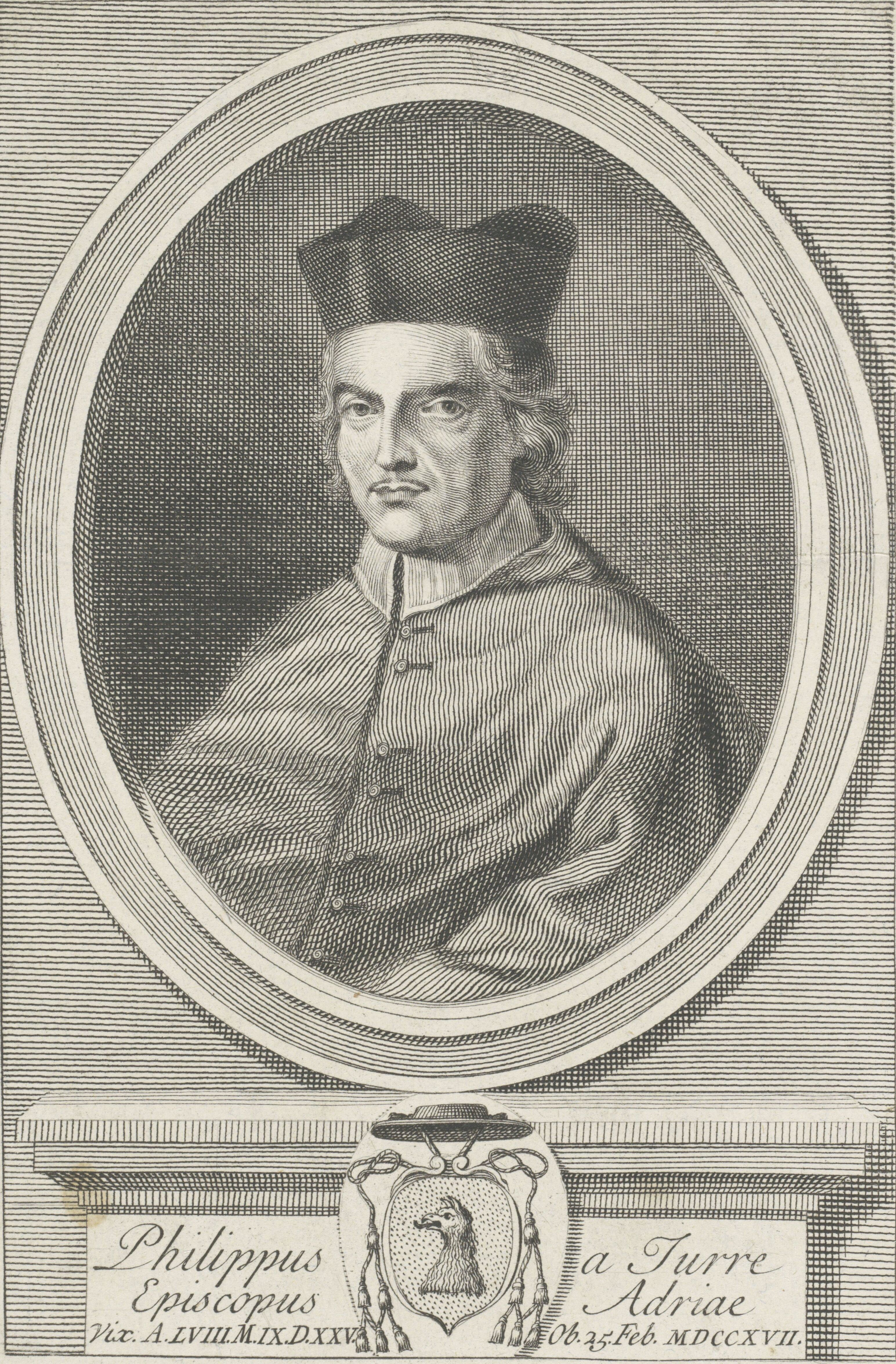
- Church: Catholic Church
- Diocese: Diocese of Adria
- In office: 1702-1717
- Predecessor: Carlo Labia
- Successor: Antonio Vaira

Orders
- Consecration: 19 March 1702

Personal details
- Born: 1 May 1657 Cividale del Friuli, Republic of Venice
- Died: 25 February 1717 (aged 59) Rovigo, Republic of Venice

Filippo della Torre (1 May 1657 – 25 February 1717) was an Italian humanist, antiquarian and Roman Catholic prelate who served as Bishop of Adria (1702-1717).

== Biography ==
Filippo della Torre was born in 1657, of a noble family at Cividale del Friuli. His connexions with Ottavio Ferrari, one of the most distinguished Italian philologists, increased his natural taste for that study. Having settled at Rome, he gained the esteem and friendship of the cardinals Imperiali and Noris, Pope Innocent XII and Clement XI. While at Rome, he published a work on the antiquities of Antium, Monumenta veteris Antii, which was much esteemed by contemporary scholars. On 19 March 1702, he was consecrated Bishop of Adria. He served in that position until his death in 1717. Girolamo Lioni wrote a biography of Filippo della Torre.

== Works ==
- “Monumenta veteris Antii hoc est inscriptio M. Aquilii et tabula solis Mithrae variis figuris & symbolis exsculpta”, Rome 1700 and 1714; reprinted in Burmann’s Thesaurus rerum italicarum (vol. VIII);
- “Taurobolium antiquum Lugduni anno 1704 repertum, cum explicatione,” Lyon, 1704, reprinted in Sallengre’s “Thesaurus Antiquitatum” (vol. II) and in Jean Le Clerc's Bibliothèque choisie (XVII, 167-185);
- “De annis imperii M. Antonii Aurelii Heliogabali,” Padua, 1714.

== Bibliography ==
- Chalmers, Alexander (1814). "Torre, Philip Della". General Biographical Dictionary. Vol. 29. London: J. Nichols. p. 470.
- Di Zio, Tiziana (1990). "DEL TORRE, Filippo". Dizionario Biografico degli Italiani (in Italian). Vol. 38: Della Volpe–Denza. Rome: Istituto dell'Enciclopedia Italiana. ISBN 978-88-12-00032-6.

Catholic Church titles
Preceded by Carlo Labia	Bishop of Adria; 1702–1717	Succeeded by Antonio Vaira
