= Triveneto =

Historical region in northeastern Italy

The Tre Venezie

The Triveneto (Italian: [triˈvɛːneto]) or Tre Venezie (Italian: [ˈtre vveˈnɛttsje]; Venetian: Tre Venesie, lit. 'Three Venetias'; German: Venetien), also often referred to as North-Eastern Italy or simply North-East (Note: Not to be misunderstood with the statistical region Northeast Italy, which includes Emilia-Romagna, too.) (Italian: Italia nord-orientale or Nord-Est), is a historical region of Italy, traditionally including western areas of present-day Slovenia and Croatia. The area is made up of the three smaller historical regions of Venezia Euganea ("Euganean Venetia"), Venezia Giulia ("Julian Venetia") and Venezia Tridentina ("Tridentine Venetia"). This territory was named after the Roman region of Venetia et Histria.

Nowadays, the name Triveneto is more commonly used in the Northern Italian languages, while its original title Tre Venezie is still in use in the Southern Italian languages, and it is restricted to the three administrative regions of Veneto, Friuli-Venezia Giulia and Trentino-Alto Adige/Südtirol (that is to say, the provinces of Belluno, Bolzano, Gorizia, Padua, Pordenone, Rovigo, Trento, Treviso, Trieste, Udine, Venice, Verona, and Vicenza). This area also corresponds to the Roman Catholic Ecclesiastical Region of Triveneto.

== History ==
Until the French Revolutionary Wars the Republic of Venice controlled Venezia Euganea (the Domini di Terraferma) and some parts of Venezia Giulia (Monfalcone and most of Istria; some other areas were also held at various times). The other areas were part of the Holy Roman Empire: Venezia Tridentina corresponded to the Prince-Bishoprics of Trent and Brixen and southern parts of the County of Tyrol; the remainder of Venezia Giulia was split between the Princely County of Gorizia and Gradisca, the Imperial Free City of Trieste, the Margraviate of Istria and parts of the Duchy of Carniola. Aside from the ecclesiastical states all of these were controlled by the Habsburg monarchy (Austria); Trent and Brixen were both incorporated into Tyrol in 1803 (Reichsdeputationshauptschluss). The city of Fiume was removed from the Empire and transferred as a Corpus separatum to the Kingdom of Hungary (which was also ruled by the Habsburgs) in 1779.

The Republic of Venice was occupied and dissolved by French Republican forces during the Italian campaign of 1796–1797. While its former Lombard areas became part of the Cisalpine Republic, the eastern areas corresponding to Venezia Euganea and Venezia Giulia (as well as Dalmatia) passed to the Habsburgs as the Venetian Province, giving them control of the whole Triveneto region (after 1803). This was short-lived however as in 1805 (Peace of Pressburg) Austria was forced to cede Tyrol to Bavaria and the Venetian Province to the Napoleonic Kingdom of Italy; western parts of Gorizia were also ceded to Napoleonic Italy in 1807. In 1809 (Treaty of Schönbrunn) Bavaria ceded southern Tyrol (including all of the modern Trentino province and the area around Bolzano) to Napoleonic Italy (Department of Alto Adige), while Austria ceded large amounts of territory, including all of its remaining parts of Venezia Giulia to the Napoleonic Illyrian Provinces; Istria and Dalmatia were also transferred from Italy to the Illyrian Provinces. This division of territory remained until Napoleon's defeat.

From 1815 (Congress of Vienna) until 1866 the entire area was once again under Austrian rule, with Venezia Tridentina forming part of the County of Tyrol, Venezia Euganea the Kingdom of Lombardy-Venetia, and Venezia Giulia the Kingdom of Illyria until 1849, then the Austrian Littoral thereafter. Although initially part of Illyria, Fiume was restored to Hungary in 1822; it was transferred to Croatia in 1849 (March Constitution (Austria)) but restored to Hungary again in 1860.

Italy annexed Venezia Euganea in the 1866 Peace of Prague following the Third Italian War of Independence and a controversial plebiscite (see Venetian nationalism); Venezia Giulia and Venezia Tridentina passed to Italy in 1920, following the end of World War I (Treaty of Saint-Germain-en-Laye (1919)); Fiume briefly became the Free State of Fiume until it was annexed by Italy to Venezia Giulia in 1924.

After World War II, Italy retained the majority of Tre Venezie, but lost Slovenian and Croatian majority areas of the upper Isonzo valley (together with the eastern part of Gorizia, today called Nova Gorica), the city of Fiume, most of the Carso region and most of Istria to Yugoslavia (Treaty of Peace with Italy, 1947). The areas of Trieste (Zone A) and north-west Istria (Zone B) were formed into the Free Territory of Trieste: in 1954, Italy reannexed Zone A, while Zone B was ceded to Yugoslavia.

== Heritage and culture ==
This territory [specifically Trentino-Alto Adige/Südtirol and Friuli-Venezia Giulia] is known well for its close ties with the German and Slavic worlds. Its cultural history dates back to the people who inhabited the area before and during the Roman Empire (Euganei, ancient Veneti, Raeti, Carni, and Cenomani); to the Medieval duchies of Bavaria and Carinthia, Patriarchate of Aquileia and comuni; to the Republic of Venice and the Austrian Empire.

Currently, Italian is used as the official language in all the regions, but other local languages are spoken by the population: Venetian, Friulian, German, Ladin, and Slovene, in their several dialects. German is a co-official language in Trentino-Alto Adige/Südtirol; Friulian is co-official language in Friuli-Venezia Giulia; Slovene (Friuli-Venezia Giulia) and Ladin (Veneto, Trentino-Alto Adige/Südtirol) are co-official languages in some municipalities.

== See also ==
- Austrian Empire
- Graziadio Isaia Ascoli
- Italy
- Northeast Italy
- Padania
- Venetia
- Venetian nationalism
