= Acclamatio =

Expression of enthusiasm in Ancient Roman and Byzantine tradition

In Ancient Roman and Byzantine tradition, acclamatio (Koiné ἀκτολογία aktologia) was the public expression of approbation or disapprobation, pleasure or displeasure, etc., by loud acclamations. On many occasions, there appear to have been certain forms of acclamations always used by the Romans; as, for instance, at marriages, Io Hymen, Hymenaee, or Talassio; at triumphs, Io triumphe, Io triumphe; at the conclusion of plays the last actor called out Plaudite to the spectators; orators were usually praised by such expressions as Bene et praeclare, Belle et festive, Non potest melius, etc.

Under the Roman Empire, the name of acclamationes was given to the praises and flatteries which the senate bestowed upon the emperor and his family. These acclamationes, which are frequently quoted by the Scriptores Historiae Augustae, were often of considerable length, and seem to have been chanted by the whole body of senators. Acclamations were also means of political expression and participation, especially in cities. While formulaic, they could play a powerful role in late antique governance.

There were regular acclamationes shouted by the people, of which one of the most common was Dii te servent. Other instances of acclamationes are given by Franciscus Ferrarius (Francesco Bernardino Ferrari), in his De Veterum Acclamationibus et Plausu, and in Graevius, Thesaurus antiquitatum Romanarum vol. vi.

== See also ==
- Constantine VII
- De Ceremoniis

== Bibliography ==
Aldrete, G.S. (2003) Gestures and Acclamations in Ancient Rome. Baltimore: Johns Hopkins University Press.

Fafinski, M. (2024) ‘A Restless City: Edessa and Urban Actors in the Syriac Acts of the Second Council of Ephesus’, Al-Masāq, pp. 1–25. Available at: https://doi.org/10.1080/09503110.2024.2331915.

Gregory, T.E. (1979) Vox populi: Popular opinion and violence in the religious controversies of the fifth century A.D. Columbus: Ohio State University Press.

Kelly, C. (2009) Ruling the Later Roman Empire. Harvard: Harvard University Press.

Magalhães De Oliveira, J.C. (2021) ‘Informal Expressions of Popular Will in Late Roman Africa’, in C. Brélaz and E. Rose (eds) Cultural Encounters in Late Antiquity and the Middle Ages. Turnhout, Belgium: Brepols Publishers, pp. 145–165. Available at: https://doi.org/10.1484/M.CELAMA-EB.5.123819.

Roueché, C. (1984) ‘Acclamations in the Later Roman Empire: New Evidence from Aphrodisias’, The Journal of Roman Studies, 74, pp. 181–199.

Wiemer, H.-U. (2004) ‘Akklamationen im spätrömischen Reich. Zur Typologie und Funktion eines Kommunikationsrituals’, Archiv für Kulturgeschichte, 86, pp. 27–74.
