= Federico Maria Molin =

- Bishop of Adria
- Church: Catholic Church
- Appointed: 24 August 1807
- Term ended: 16 April 1819
- Predecessor: Arnaldo Speroni degli Alvarotti
- Successor: Carlo Pio Ravasi
- Other post: Abbot nullius of Asola

Orders
- Ordination: 20 December 1777 (Priest)
- Consecration: 9 October 1785 (Bishop) by Federico Maria Giovanelli

Personal details
- Born: 17 November 1753 Venice,
- Died: 16 April 1819 (aged 65) Adria
- Buried: Adria Cathedral

Federico Maria Molin (1753–1819) was a Catholic prelate who served as Bishop of Adria (1807–1819).

== Life ==
Federico Maria Molin was born in Venice on 17 November 1753. He was not a patrician, because only his father, Vettor Benedetto Secondo, held patrician status while his mother did not. Federico Maria became a cleric in 1763, and on 20 December 1777, he was ordained a priest by Patriarch Federico Maria Giovanelli. He served as priest in the Venetian churches of San Simeone Profeta and San Pantalon.

On 30 July 1785, he was elected Abbot nullius of Asola in Venice with 169 votes. Pope Pius VI confirmed his election appointed him titular bishop of Apollonia on 26 September 1785. Federico Maria was consecrated as a bishop on 9 October 1785 in the patriarchal church of San Pietro di Castello in Venice by Patriarch Federico Maria Giovanelli.

Due to the disruptions of the Napoleonic Wars, the diocese of Adria remained without bishop since 1800. With the agreement of Napoleon, Federico Maria Molin was appointed bishop of that diocese on 24 August 1807 and entered in Adria on 8 January 1808. He participated, with other Italian bishops, to the Council of Paris in 1811 summoned by Napoleon.

Under his episcopate, in 1819, was agreed an exchange of parishes among the dioceses of Adria, Ferrara and Padova, in order to follow the natural borders marked by the rivers. He died in Adria on 16 April 1819 and he was buried in the cathedral of that town. His younger brother, Giulio (1768–1841), was also an Abbot.
