= Roman Catholic Ecclesiastical Province of Venice =

The Roman Catholic Ecclesiastical Province of Venice is one of four ecclesiastical provinces which make up the Roman Catholic Ecclesiastical Region of Triveneto in Italy.

Its principal diocese is the Roman Catholic Archdiocese of Venice and the Patriarch of Venice is the metropolitan bishop of the province. The province's other dioceses are those of Adria-Rovigo, Belluno-Feltre, Chioggia, Concordia-Pordenone, Padua, Treviso, Verona, Vicenza and Vittorio Veneto.
