= Canace (play) =

Verse tragedy by Sperone Speroni

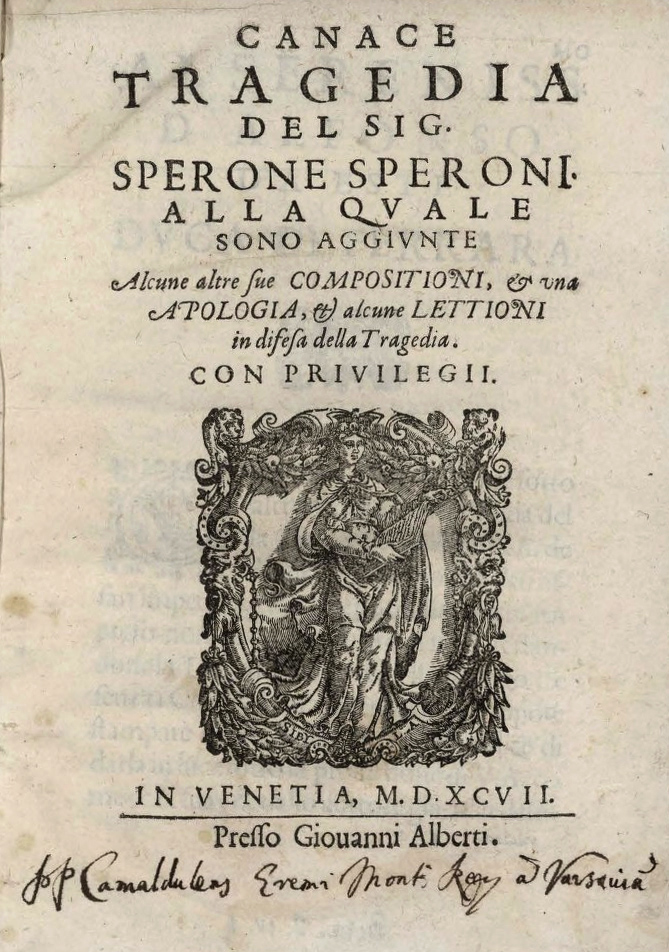
Title page of the 1597 edition of Canace

Canace is a verse tragedy by Italian playwright Sperone Speroni (1500–1588). It is based on the Greek legend of Canace, the daughter of Aeolus, who was forced by her father to commit suicide for having fallen in love with her brother, Macar.

The play was composed for Padua's literary academy, the Accademia degli Infiammati, and was printed at Firenze on 1546. The play was heavily modeled on Senecan tragedy.

The work was highly polemical, and was performed only once. The public's reaction led Speroni to write an Apologia (1550), which he never finished. Still, the play circulated widely, and, with Giovanni Battista Giraldi's Orbecche, led to literary debates on tragedy and theatrical morals and decorum through to the next century.

A translation by Elio Brancaforte, released by the Centre for Renaissance and Reformation Studies in 2013, was the first time the play was published in English.

== See also ==
- Giovanni Battista Giraldi
