= Sperone Speroni =

Italian humanist

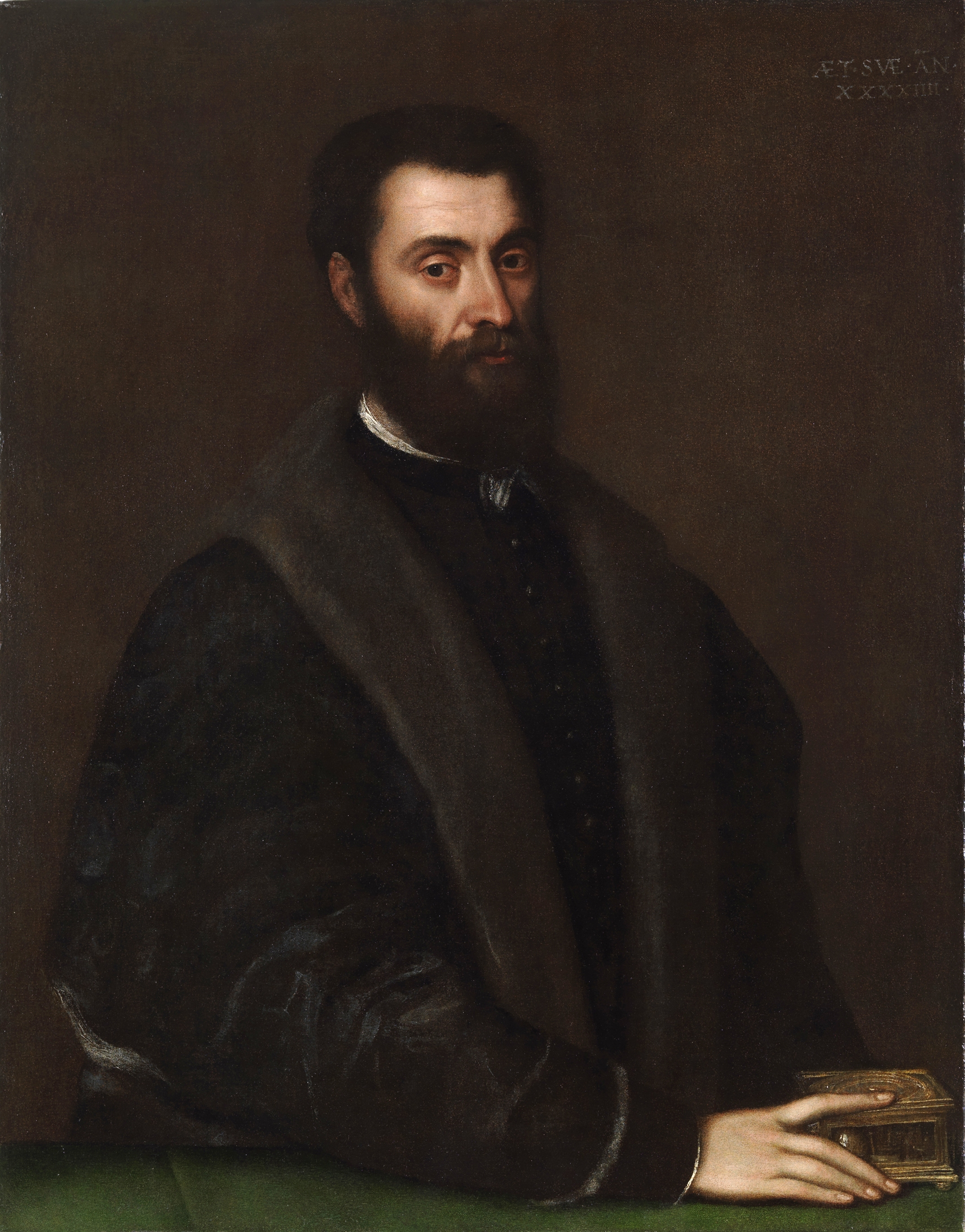
Portrait of Sperone Speroni by Titian, 1544.

Sperone Speroni degli Alvarotti (1500–1588) was an Italian Renaissance humanist, scholar and dramatist. He was one of the central members of Padua's literary academy Accademia degli Infiammati and wrote on both moral and literary matters.

== Biography ==
Born April 12, 1500 in Padua, Sperone was the second child of Bernardino Speroni degli Alvarotti and Lucia Contarini. In 1518 he obtained the artibus degree from the University of Padua and joined the Guild (Sacro Collegio) of artists and physicians. He lectured on philosophy at Padua, under the Chair of Logic. He interrupted his teachings to study at Bologna under Pietro Pomponazzi but, after Pietro's death, returned to Padua where he obtained an Extraordinary Chair of Philosophy, a post he held for another three years.

His literary career began with the publication of the Dialoghi ("Dialogues") at Venice (1542). Very famous and influential was his polemic with Giovan Battista Giraldi about the principles of theatre, involving Giraldi's tragedy Orbecche as well as Speroni's tragedy Canace. Between 1560 and 1564 he lived in Rome, where he became a close friend of Annibal Caro and frequented the meetings of the Accademia delle Notti Vaticane. He then returned to Padua, where he continued his literary production. When Ugo Boncompagni was made Pope Gregory XIII in 1572, Speroni returned to Rome. In 1578, he went back to Padua where he died on June 2, 1588.

A member descending of the same family, Arnaldo Speroni degli Alvarotti (1727-1801) would become bishop of Rovigo.

== Works ==
Speroni's works include:

- Dialogo della retorica (1542), on rhetoric;
- Dialogo delle dignità delle donne (1542), on the status of women;
- Dialogo d'amore (written in 1537 and published in 1542), on the nature of love.
- Dialogo delle lingue (1542), a defense of vernacular languages instead of Latin.
- Canace (1546), a verse tragedy; followed by an Apologia (1550).
- Discorso su Dante (1560), on the poet Dante.
- Discorso su l'Eneide (1560), on Virgil's Aeneid.
- Discorso sul Orlando Furioso (1560), on Ariosto's poem Orlando Furioso.
- Dialogo della istoria (1560), on history.

== Influence ==
His play Canace, based on a Greek legend of incestuous love, was only performed once; but was widely diffused, and (together with Giraldi's play Orbecche) led to literary debates on tragedy and theatrical morals through to the next century.

Speroni's Dialogo delle lingue (1542) greatly influenced French Renaissance thinking about the French language; it formed the basis of Joachim Du Bellay's Deffense et illustration de la langue française (1549) and inspired in part the literary studies of Claude Fauchet.

Speroni was a friend and supporter of Venetian-language playwright Angelo Beolco (el Ruzante). His Dialogo delle lingue was an important source for Joachim du Bellay's Défense et illustration de la langue française.

== Sources ==
- Jossa, Stefano (1996). Rappresentazione e scrittura. La crisi delle forme poetiche rinascimentali (1540-1560). Naples: Vivarium.
