= Orbecche =

Orbecche is a tragedy written by Giovanni Battista Giraldi in 1541. It was the first modern tragedy written on classical principles, and along with Sperone Speroni's Canace, was responsible for a sixteenth-century theoretical debate on theater, especially with regard to decorum.

It was produced in Ferrara in 1541, with incidental music composed by Alfonso della Vivuola and sets by the painter Girolamo da Carpi. Ercole II d'Este was present at the premiere, which took place at the playwright's house. The play was printed in 1543, with several additions for the reader's benefit.

Though the play followed Aristotelian principles in terms of structure, thematically it was Senecan, featuring vengeance, rage, hate, and the depiction of violence.

== Plot ==
The main character, Orbecche, is the daughter of the Persian king Sulmone. She is the mother of two children and the wife of Oronte, whom she married very young, unbeknownst to her father.

Sulmone only discovers the existence of the secret marriage and the children many years later, the day he decides to give Orbecche's hand in marriage to another prince. The discovery of the "betrayal" of his daughter, who has acted against his paternal authority, wounds his pride. The king's terrible revenge has as its goal the restoration of his lost majesty and the legitimacy of the state. This revenge is the prime mover of the action and provokes the catastrophe in the story.

At the beginning of the play, a short prologue informs the spectators of the existence of an ulterior hubris, referring back to an event from Orbecche's infancy: as a child she was indirectly responsible for the murder of her mother and brother.

Orbecche and Sulmone are characters moved by opposing values: the first, by freedom to feel real emotions (love above all); the second by the good of the state and the social order.

Sulmone devises a plan of pitiless revenge: he pretends to pardon Orbecche and to accept that what's done is done (the marriage and heirs) with the goal of pulling the children to him. He invites over his daughter and her family and announces to Oronte his intention of making him heir to the throne. It's a cruel trick; shortly after he has him arrested and condemned to death for treason. Oronte is brought to the castle dungeon, where Sulmone cuts off his hands and then kills both his children in front of his eyes, then kills him.

The king's violence continues with his desecration of the corpses, then his revenge turns against Orbecche. She too is the victim of a trick: he shows her affection and presents her a "wedding gift", a mysterious "surprise". It is the corpses of her children with the head of her husband on a silver platter, covered by a cloth that she herself is invited to lift, to discover "the truth" for herself.

Orbecche, confronted by this, is devastated by desperation, but in her turn decides to take her revenge using the same method, that is, betrayal. She is able to regain her father's trust and pretends to reconcile with him, taking advantage of the situation (an affectionate embrace between the two) to stab him.

Orbecche assumes power at the death of the king, according to the laws of the state. Now, however, she is alone in the world, after the extermination of her family. Her pain is unbearable and, with her act of violence, she feels that she has betrayed herself or rather all the values that her character represents. With no more identity, and desiring no longer to hold on to a life with no sense, the queen commits suicide.

One last suicide closes the tragedy: that of Orbecche's nurse. The woman who nursed her as a child is the first important character to appear in the play, and the last. The nurse is forced to witness the death of Orbecche in the last scene, in which the mood is of struggling affection, as in the beginning. Such symmetry in the plot completes the darkness of the tragedy.

== See also ==
- Erofili
