= Lucio Soravito de Franceschi =

Italian Roman Catholic bishop (1939–2019)

- Bishop of Adria-Rovigo
- Church: Catholic Church
- Diocese: Diocese of Adria-Rovigo
- In office: 29 May 2004 – 23 December 2015
- Predecessor: Andrea Bruno Mazzocato
- Successor: Pierantonio Pavanello

Orders
- Ordination: 29 June 1963
- Consecration: 11 July 2004 by Pietro Brollo

Personal details
- Born: 8 December 1939 Ovaro, Province of Friuli, Kingdom of Italy
- Died: 6 July 2019 (aged 79) Udine, Friuli-Venezia Giulia, Italy

Lucia Soravito de Franceschi (8 December 1939 – 6 July 2019) was an Italian Roman Catholic bishop.

Soravito de Franceschi was born in Italy and was ordained to the priesthood in 1963. He served as bishop of the Roman Catholic Diocese of Adria-Rovigo, Italy from 2004 to 2015.
