= Adria Cathedral =

Church building in Adria, Italy

Coordinates: 45°03′24″N 12°03′21″E

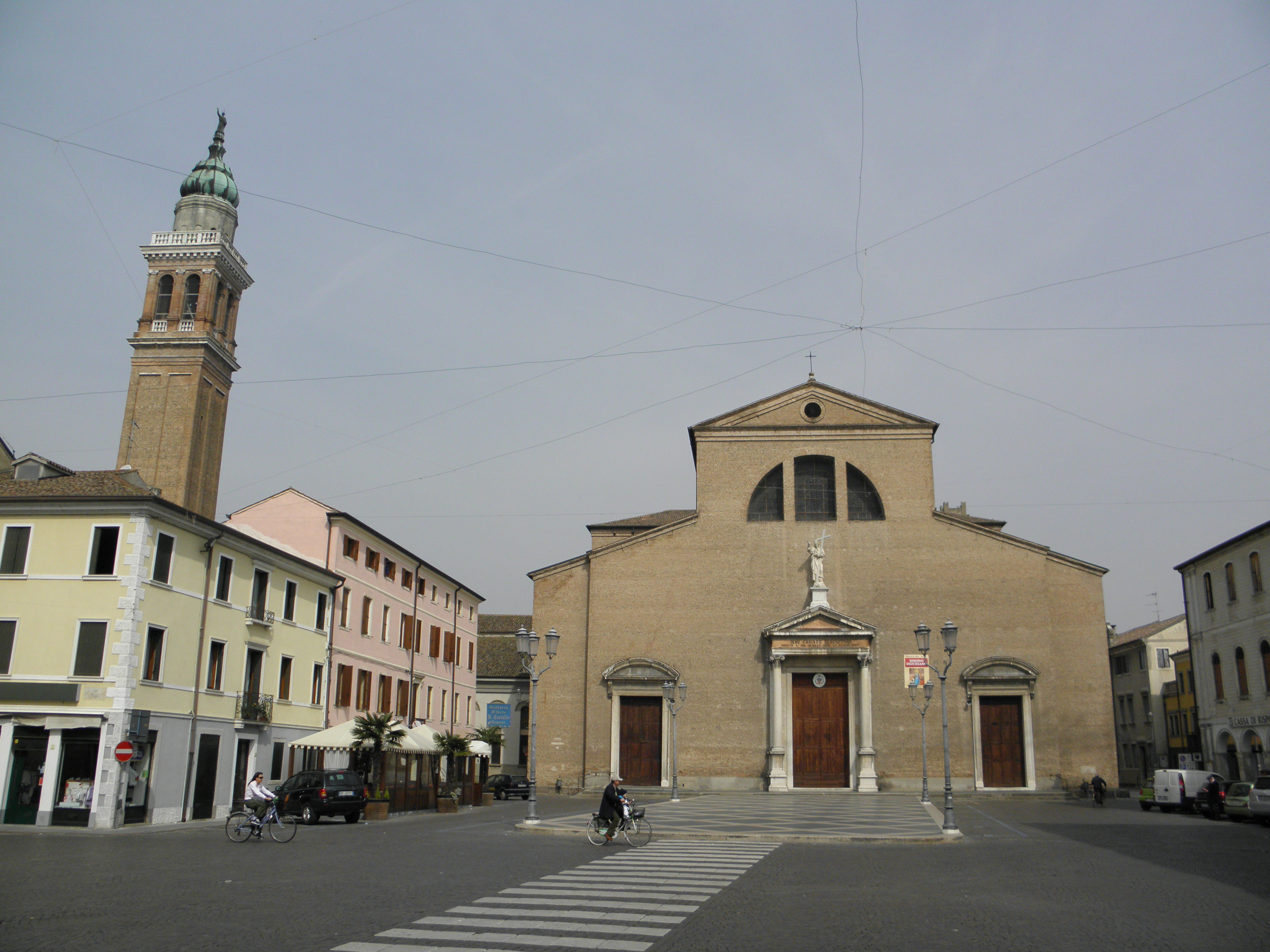
West front of the new cathedral on the piazza

Adria Cathedral (or the New Cathedral; Italian: Duomo di Adria; Cattedrale Nuova dei Santi Pietro i Paulo) is a Roman Catholic cathedral in the city of Adria, in the province of Rovigo and the region of Veneto, Italy. Formerly the episcopal seat of the Diocese of Adria, it has been since 1986 that of the Diocese of Adria-Rovigo.

Location of Adria Cathedral

The present cathedral replaces the much older former cathedral nearby, dedicated to Saint John, the Old Cathedral (Cattedrale Vecchia, Chiesa di San Giovanni), which continues in use as a parish church.

The new cathedral, dedicated to Saints Peter and Paul, was built in the early 19th century over a 14th-century church. When works were undertaken in 1830 to investigate the stability of the foundations, a Byzantine crypt and frescoes were discovered.

The cathedral also contains a Byzantine bas relief of the 6th century, a Byzantine altar and crucifix, and in the sacristy some magnificently carved cupboards by Giacomo Piazzetta from the Charity School of Venice.

Behind the building a replica of the Grotto of Lourdes was constructed in the 1930s, which still attracts many visitors.

== Sources and external links ==
- Adria Cathedral official website (in Italian) (in Italian)
- Diocese of Adria-Rovigo: official website (in Italian)
- Catholic Encyclopedia: Adria
- Catholic Hierarchy: Diocese of Adria-Rovigo
