= Carlo Labia =

Italian Catholic archbishop

Most Reverend Carlo Labia
- Archbishop (Personal Title) of Adria
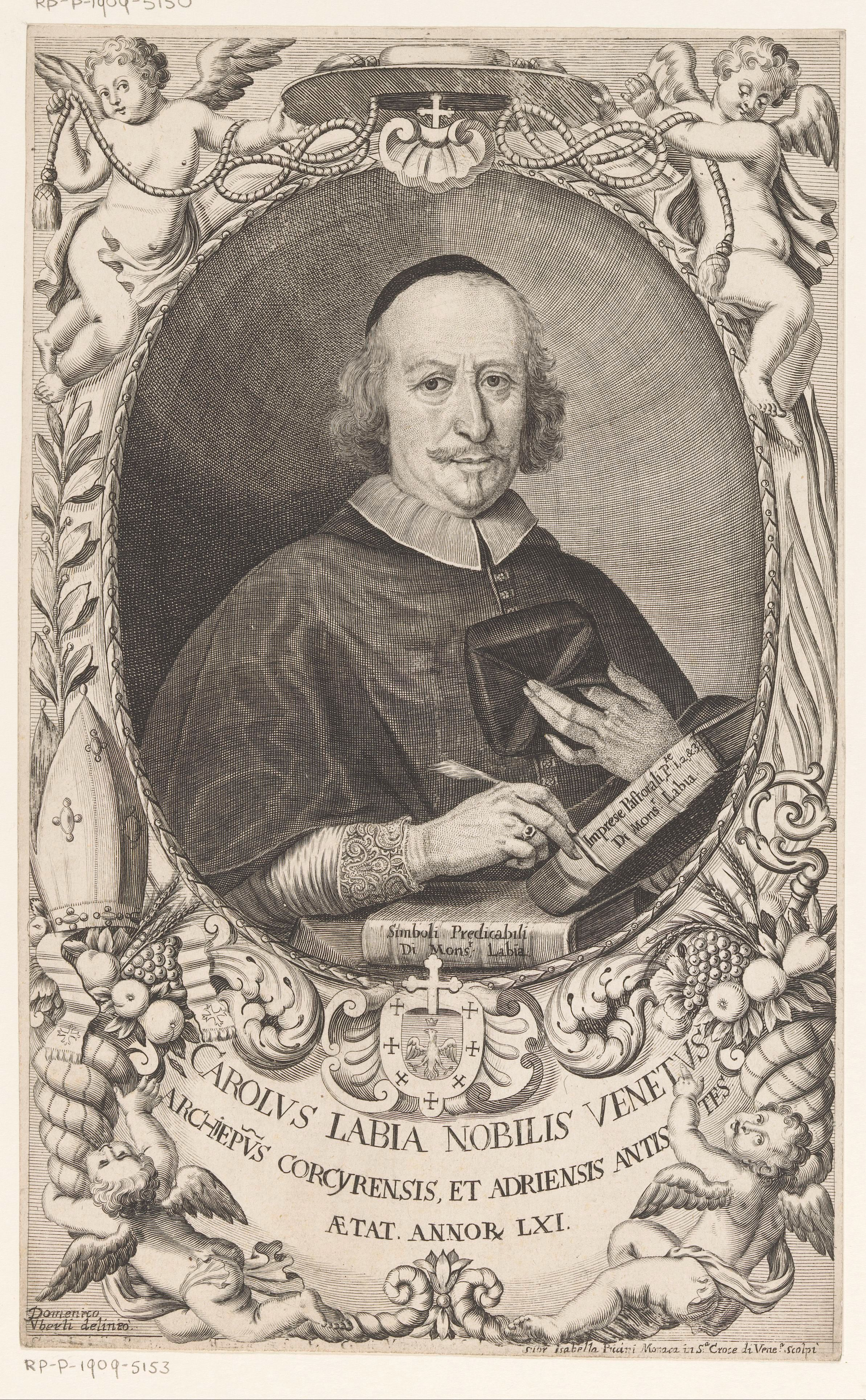
- Church: Catholic Church
- In office: 1677–1701
- Predecessor: Tommaso Retani
- Successor: Filippo della Torre
- Previous post: Archbishop of Corfù (1659-1677)

Orders
- Consecration: 9 February 1659 by Giulio Cesare Sacchetti

Personal details
- Born: 1624 Venice, Italy
- Died: 29 November 1701 (age 77) Adria, Italy

Carlo Labia, C.R. (1624 – 29 November 1701) was a Roman Catholic prelate who served as Archbishop (Personal Title) of Adria (1677–1701) and Archbishop of Corfù (1659-1677).

== Biography ==
Carlo Labia was born in Venice, Italy in 1624 and ordained a priest in the Congregation of Clerics Regular of the Divine Providence. On 27 January 1659, he was appointed during the papacy of Pope Alexander VII as Archbishop of Corfù. On 9 February 1659, he was consecrated bishop by Giulio Cesare Sacchetti, Cardinal-Bishop of Sabina, with Alessandro Sperelli, Bishop of Gubbio, and Gregorio Carducci, Bishop of Valva e Sulmona, serving as co-consecrators. On 13 September 1677, he was appointed during the papacy of Pope Innocent XI as Archbishop (Personal Title) of Adria. He served as Archbishop of Adria until his death on 29 November 1701.

== External links and additional sources ==
- Cheney, David M. "Archdiocese of Corfù, Zante e Cefalonia". Catholic-Hierarchy.org. (for Chronology of Bishops) ^{[self-published]}
- Chow, Gabriel. "Metropolitan Archdiocese of Corfu–Zakynthos–Kefalonia (Greece)". GCatholic.org. (for Chronology of Bishops) ^{[self-published]}

Catholic Church titles
Preceded by Benedetto Bragadin	Archbishop of Corfù; 1659-1677	Succeeded by Marcantonio Barbarigo
Preceded by Tommaso Retani	Archbishop (Personal Title) of Adria; 1677–1701	Succeeded by Filippo della Torre
