= Northeast Italy =

Geographic region of Italy

Coordinates: 45°30′N 12°00′E

Northeast Italy Italia nord-orientale (Italian) Nord-est (Italian)
- Statistical region
- Country: Italy
- Regions: List: Emilia-Romagna; Friuli-Venezia Giulia; Veneto; (Trentino-Alto Adige/Südtirol) Trentino-Alto Adige

Area
  - Total: 62,384.89 km^{2} (24,086.94 sq mi)

Population (2026)
  - Total: 11,618,783
  - Density: 186.2435/km^{2} (482.3686/sq mi)
- Languages
  - Official language: Italian
  - Official linguistic minorities: Friulian; German; Ladin; Slovene
  - Regional languages: Emilian–Romagnol; Venetian

Northeast Italy (Italian: Italia nord-orientale or just Nord-est) is one of the five official statistical regions of Italy used by the National Institute of Statistics (ISTAT), a first level NUTS region and a European Parliament constituency. Northeast encompasses four of the country's 20 regions:

- Emilia-Romagna
- Friuli-Venezia Giulia
- Trentino-Alto Adige/Südtirol
- Veneto

== Historical names ==
Triveneto

Triveneto (literally "Triple Veneto") is a historical region of Italy. The area is made up of the three smaller historical regions of Venezia Euganea ("Euganean Venetia"), Venezia Giulia ("Julian March") and Venezia Tridentina ("Tridentine Venetia"). This territory was named after the Roman region of Venetia et Histria. The entire area was under Austrian rule in 1863; Italy annexed Venezia Euganea in 1866, following the Third Italian War of Independence and a controversial plebiscite (see Venetian nationalism); Julian Venetia and Venezia Tridentina passed under the Italian rule in 1919, following the end of World War I. After World War II, Italy retained the most part of Tre Venezie, but lost Slovenian and Croatian majority areas of the upper Isonzo valley (together with the eastern part of Gorizia, today called Nova Gorica), the city of Fiume, most of the Carso region and most part of Istria to Yugoslavia. The areas of Trieste (Zone A) and north-west Istria (Zone B) were formed in the Free Territory of Trieste: in 1954, Italy reannexed Zone A, while Zone B was ceded to Yugoslavia. Nowadays the name Triveneto includes the three administrative regions of Veneto, Friuli-Venezia Giulia and Trentino-Alto Adige/Südtirol

Roman Venetia et Histria

Venetia et Histria, an old region of Italy at the time of the Roman Empire, refers to Veneto, Trentino, Friuli-Venezia Giulia, East Lombardy and Istria; it was named after the people of Veneti, who inhabited that region, and who are still largely the main ethnic group of the Italian area (other main ethnic groups include Friulani in the east, mostly in the Udine province; Ladins in the Dolomites, between Veneto and Trentino-Alto Adige/Südtirol; Germans in South Tyrol; and Slovene minorities on the border with Slovenia and in the city of Trieste); after 1947, Venetian/Istrian Italians became a minority in Slovenian and Croatian Istria. Roman Venetia et Histria was originally created by Augustus as the tenth regio in 7 AD alongside the nine other regiones. The region had been one of the last regions of Italy to be incorporated into the Roman Empire. It was later renamed by Diocletian the VIII provincia Venetia et Histria in the third century. Its capital was at Aquileia, and it stretched geographically from the Arsia River in the east (in what is now Croatia) to the Abdua in the current Italian region of Lombardy, and from the Alps to the Adriatic Sea. Venetia—a region which indicated the old land provinces of the Republic of Venice from river Adda to river Isonzo—is sometimes still used today to indicate this territory together with Trentino and Trieste.

== Geography ==
It borders to the north with Austria and Switzerland, to the east with Slovenia, to the south with Liguria, Tuscany, Marche and the small state of San Marino, to the west with Lombardy and for a very short stretch with Piedmont. Emilia-Romagna, Friuli-Venezia Giulia and Veneto are washed by the Adriatic Sea.

Northeastern Italy includes most of the Po Valley, crossed by the Po river, the longest river in Italy, and includes highly industrialized regions with a high tourist activity.

=== Regions ===
Region	Capital	Population (2026)	Area (km²)	Density (inh./km²)
Emilia-Romagna	Bologna	4,477,009	22,509.67	198.9
Friuli-Venezia Giulia	Trieste	1,193,496	7,924.36	150.6
Trentino-Alto Adige/Südtirol	Trento	1,090,818	13,605.50	80.2
Veneto	Venice	4,857,460	18,345.36	264.8

== Demographics ==
Historical population
Year	Pop.	±%
1921	8,234,944	—
1931	8,596,261	+4.4%
1936	8,682,331	+1.0%
1951	9,450,802	+8.9%
1961	9,529,614	+0.8%
1971	10,045,047	+5.4%
1981	10,429,548	+3.8%
1991	10,397,664	−0.3%
2001	10,654,670	+2.5%
2011	11,450,425	+7.5%
2021	11,541,332	+0.8%
Source: ISTAT

As of 2026, the population is 11,618,783, of which 49.3% are male, and 50.7% are female. Minors make up 14.5% of the population, and seniors make up 25.3%.

=== Largest cities ===
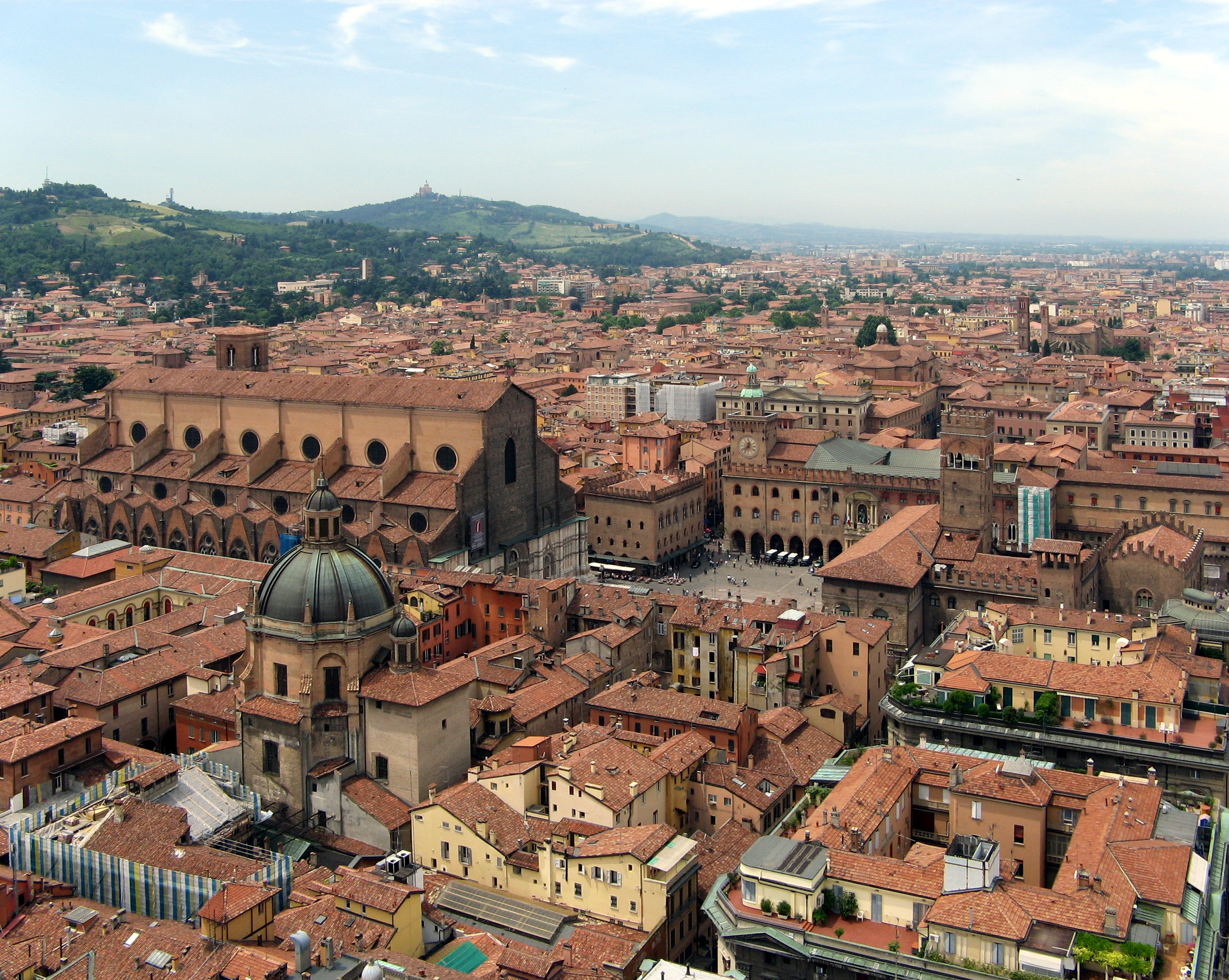
Bologna

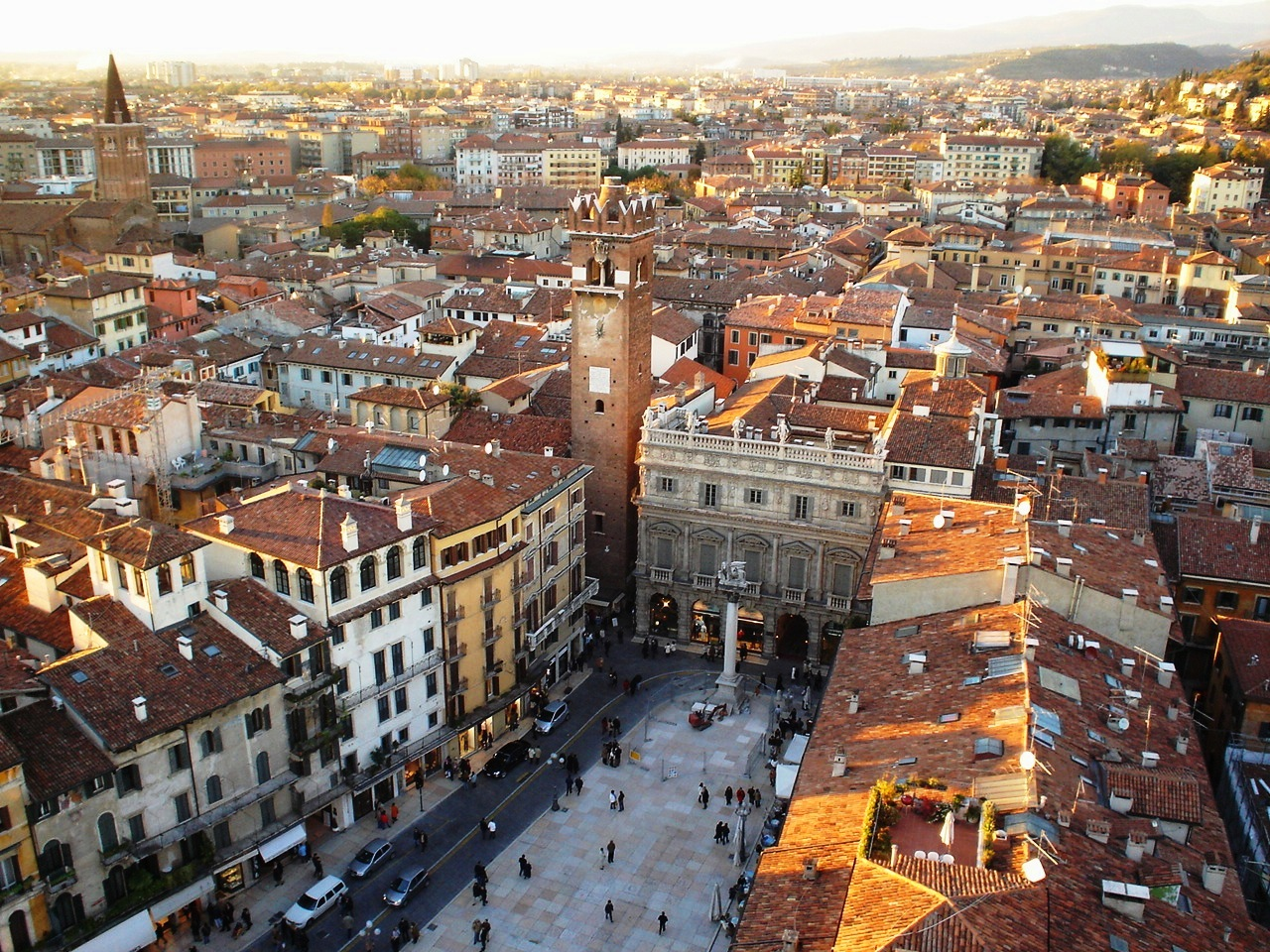
Verona

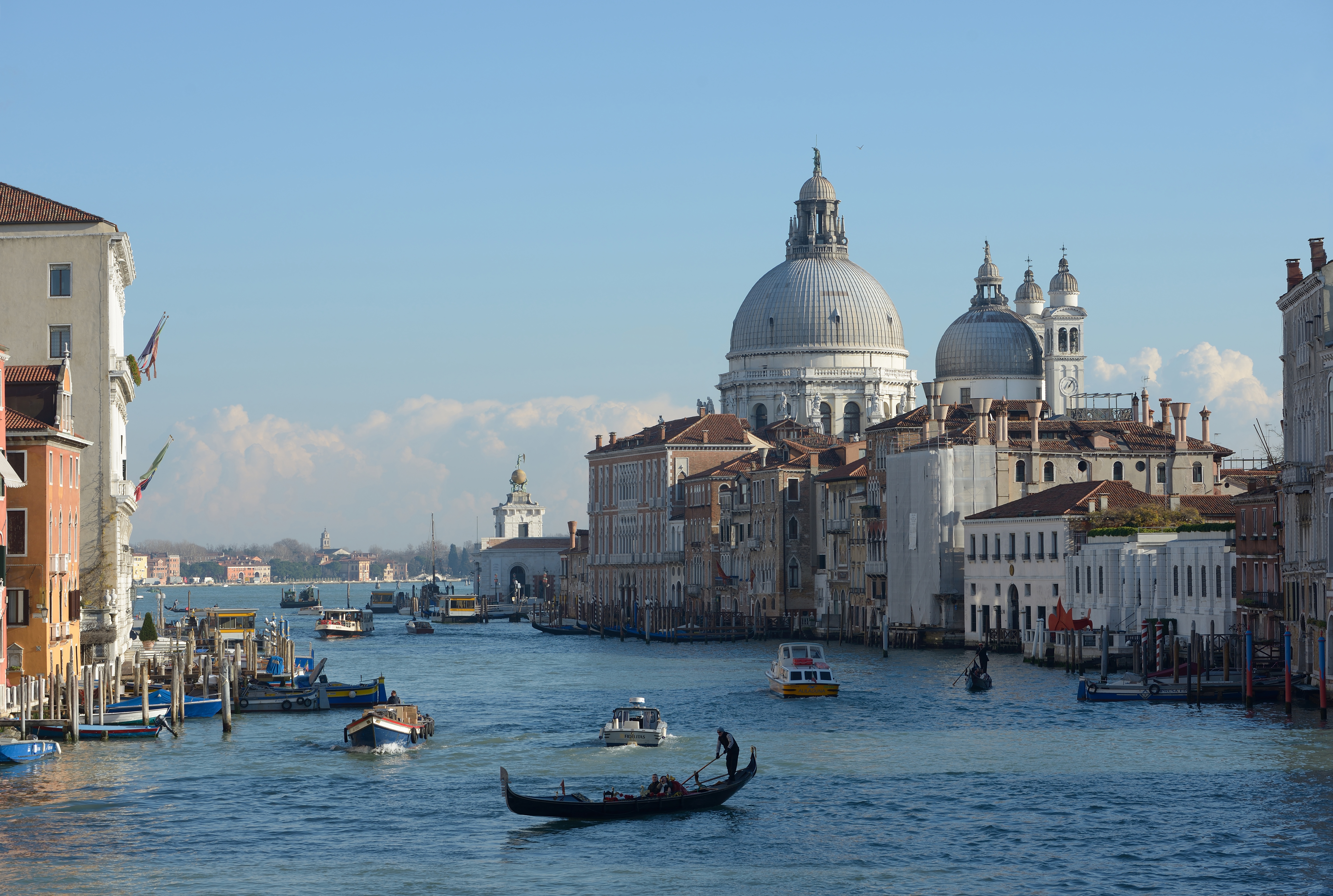
Venice

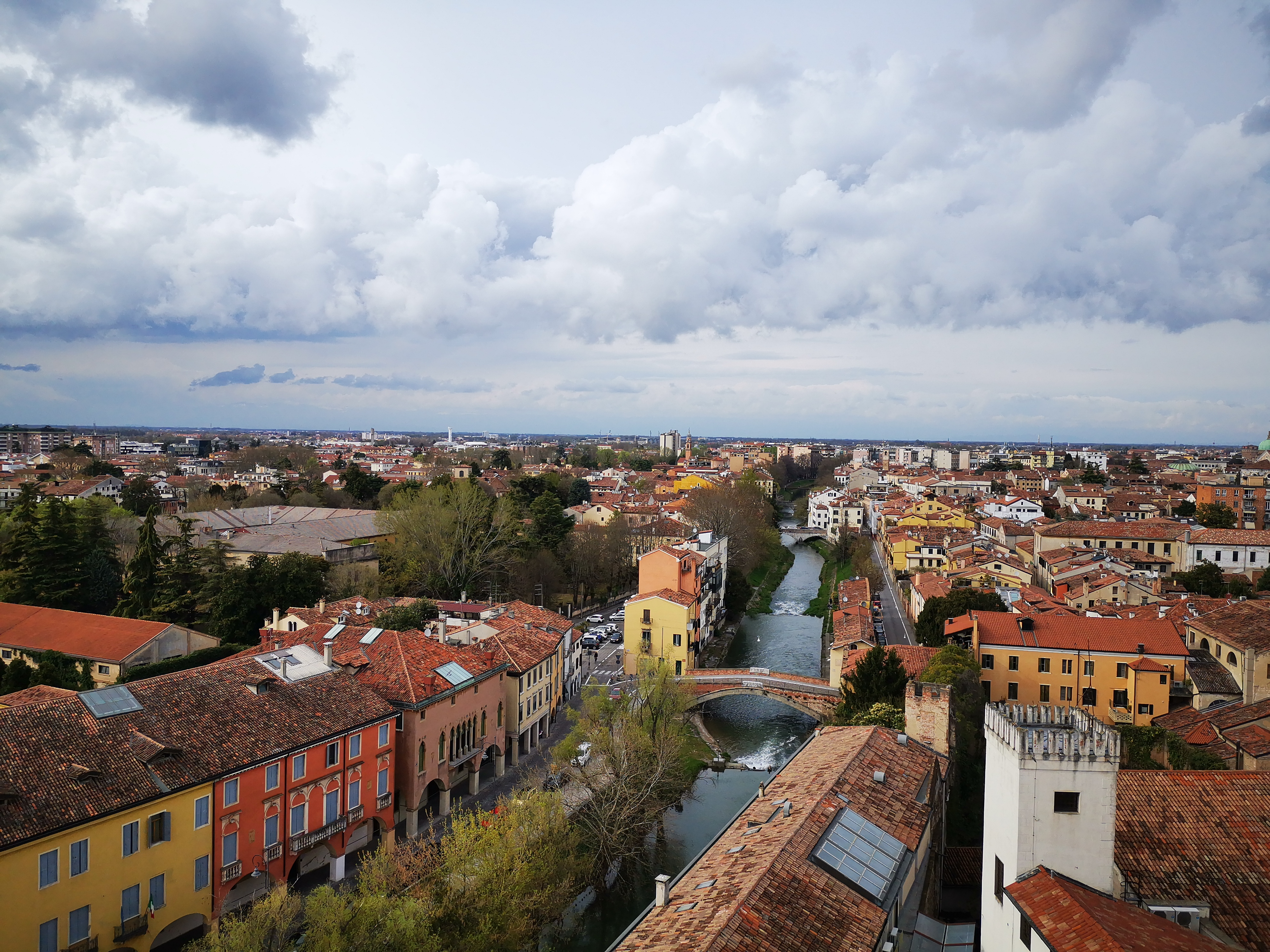
Padua

The most populous cities with more than 50,000 inhabitants are:

City	Region	Population (2026)
Bologna	Emilia-Romagna	391,473
Verona	Veneto	255,139
Venice	Veneto	249,385
Padua	Veneto	208,202
Parma	Emilia-Romagna	199,450
Trieste	Friuli-Venezia Giulia	198,622
Modena	Emilia-Romagna	184,361
Reggio Emilia	Emilia-Romagna	172,921
Ravenna	Emilia-Romagna	156,475
Rimini	Emilia-Romagna	150,774
Ferrara	Emilia-Romagna	129,048
Trento	Trentino-Alto Adige/Südtirol	119,359
Forlì	Emilia-Romagna	118,053
Vicenza	Veneto	110,741
Bolzano	Trentino-Alto Adige/Südtirol	106,901
Piacenza	Emilia-Romagna	103,737
Udine	Friuli-Venezia Giulia	98,501
Cesena	Emilia-Romagna	95,620
Treviso	Veneto	86,113
Carpi	Emilia-Romagna	74,041
Imola	Emilia-Romagna	69,702
Faenza	Emilia-Romagna	58,750
Pordenone	Friuli-Venezia Giulia	52,744

=== Languages ===
The main language is Italian. Other languages include:

- Venetian – widely spoken in Veneto and along the coast to Trieste and Istria, as well as in the towns of Pordenone and Gorizia in Friuli, and in most of Trentino, but only recognised by the Veneto region;
- Friulian – spoken in most of Friuli and nationally recognized;
- Ladin – spoken by a few thousand people in the Dolomites;
- German – the primary language of South Tyrol, where Italian is spoken by about two thirds of the inhabitants;
- Slovene – recognized by Italy and spoken on the border of Italy and Istria, where the main language today is Croatian but Italian is recognized as a minority language due to the presence of the Istrian Italians.

=== Immigration ===
As of 2025, immigrants make up 14.9% of the population. The 5 largest foreign countries of birth are Romania, Albania, Morocco, Moldova, and Ukraine.

== Economy ==
The Gross domestic product (GDP) of the region was 407.9 billion euros in 2018, accounting for 23.1% of Italy's economic output. GDP per capita adjusted for purchasing power was 34,900 euros or 116% of the EU27 average in the same year.

== See also ==
- NUTS statistical regions of Italy
- Italian NUTS level 1 regions:
  - Northwest Italy
  - South Italy
  - Insular Italy
- Northern Italy
- Central Italy
- Southern Italy
