= Ecclesiastical region =

Geographical group of dioceses, ecclesiastical provinces or parishes

An ecclesiastical region (Latin: regio ecclesiastica) is a formally organised geographical group of dioceses, ecclesiastical provinces or parishes, without a proper Ordinary as such, in Catholic or Protestant Churches.

== Catholic Church ==
Ecclesiastical regions have some historical functions within the Catholic Church, and the establishment of appropriate regions was proposed and recommended by the Second Vatican Council in its Decree on the Pastoral Office of Bishops in the Church.

Ecclesiastical regions currently group together parts of the extensive episcopates in five countries:

=== Italy ===
The Catholic Church in Italy is divided into 16 ecclesiastical regions. The regions mostly correspond to the 20 civil administrative regions of Italy.

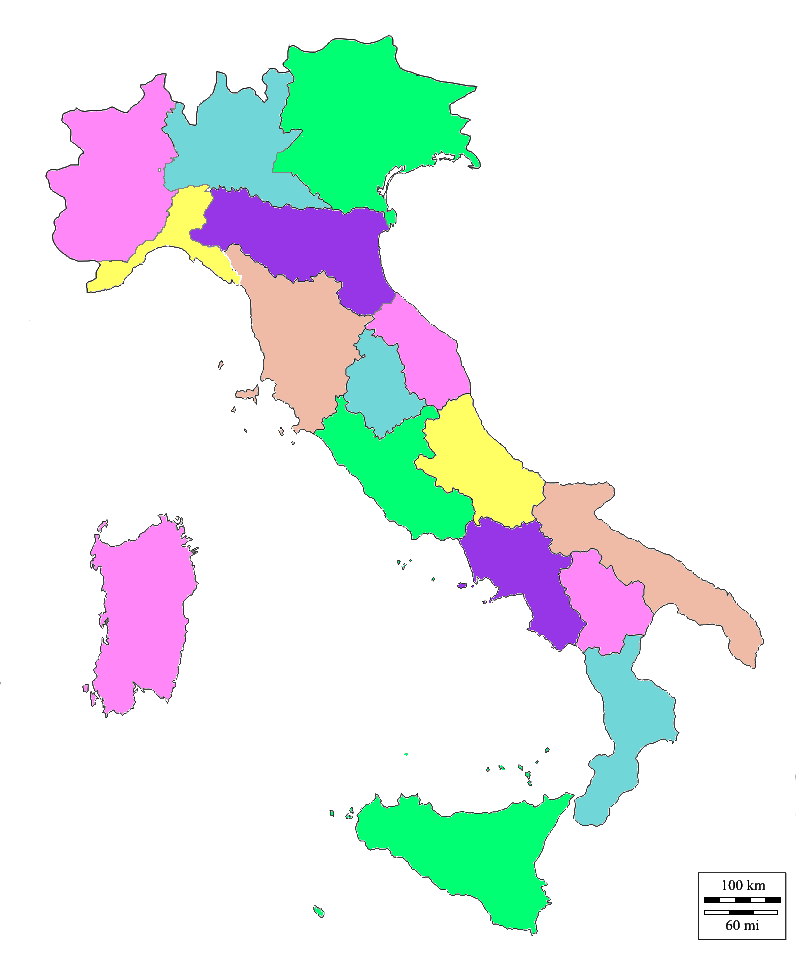
1. Abruzzo-Molise (joining those two administrative regions)
2. Basilicata
3. Calabria
4. Campania
5. Emilia-Romagna
6. Lazio = Latium
7. Liguria
8. Lombardy (Lombardia)
9. Marche(s)
10. Piemonte (Piedmont), including Valle d'Aosta
11. Puglia (Apulia)
12. Sardinia (Sardegna)
13. Sicily (Sicilia)
14. Tuscany (Toscana)
15. Triveneto (i.e. Veneto, Friuli-Venezia Giulia and Trentino-Alto Adige)
16. Umbria.

=== Brazil ===
The regions, covering the federal state(s) in parentheses, comprise the following ecclesiastical province(s):

ecclesiastical regions in Brasil.

1. Regional Norte (North) 1 (Amazonas e Roraima) : Manaus (1952)
2. Regional Norte 2 (Pará e Amapá) : Belém do Pará (1906)
3. Regional Nordeste (NE) 1 (Ceará) : Fortaleza (1915)
4. Regional Nordeste 2 (Pernambuco, Paraíba, Rio Grande do Norte e Alagoas) : Maceió (1920), Natal (1952), Olinda e Recife (1910), Paraíba (1914)
5. Regional Nordeste 3 (Bahia e Sergipe) : Aracaju (1960), Feira de Santana (2002), San Salvador di Bahia (1676), Vitória da Conquista (2002)
6. Regional Nordeste 4 (Piauí) : Teresina (1952)
7. Regional Nordeste 5 (Maranhão) Provincia ecclesiastica di São Luís do Maranhão (1922)
8. Regional Leste (East) 1 (Rio de Janeiro); Niterói (1960), Rio de Janeiro (1892)
9. Regional Leste 2 (Minas Gerais e Espírito Santo) : Belo Horizonte (1924), Diamantina (1917), Juiz de Fora (1962), Mariana (1906), Montes Claros (2001), Pouso Alegre (1962), Uberaba (1962), Vitória (1958)
10. Regional Sul (South) 1 (São Paulo) : Aparecida (1958), Botucatu (1958), Campinas (1958), Ribeirão Preto (1958), San Paolo (1908), Sorocaba (1992)
11. Regional Sul 2 (Paraná) : Cascavel (1979), Curitiba (1926), Curitiba degli Ucraini (2014), Londrina (1970), Maringá (1979)
12. Regional Sul 3 (Rio Grande do Sul) : Passo Fundo (2011), Pelotas (2011), Porto Alegre (1910), Santa Maria (2011)
13. Regional Sul 4 (Santa Catarina) : Florianópolis (1927)
14. Regional Centro-Oeste (Center-West) (Goiás, Distrito Federal e Tocantins) : Brasília (1960), Goiânia (1956), Palmas (1996) and the army bishopric Ordinariato militare in Brasile (1950)
15. Regional Oeste (West) 1 (Mato Grosso do Sul) : Campo Grande (1979)
16. Regional Oeste 2 (Mato Grosso) : Cuiabá (1910)
17. Regional Noroeste (NW) (Rondônia, Acre e Amazonas) : Porto Velho (1982)

=== Canada ===
Four regions, each comprising several Latin provinces - Ontario and West also the Eastern Catholic province/eparchies, West also a non-metropolitan Latin archdiocese :

1. Ontario (Assembly of Catholic Bishops of Ontario) : Kingston, Ottawa, Toronto, Ukrainian Eparchy of Toronto, Chaldean Eparchy of Mar Addai off Toronto, Ruthenian Eparchy of Saints Cyril and Metodius of Toronto
2. West (Assembly of Western Catholic Bishops) : Edmonton, Grouard-McLennan, Keewatin-Le Pas, Regina, Vancouver, (Latin archdiocese of) Winnipeg, Ukrainian province of Winnipeg
3. Atlantic (Atlantic Episcopal Assembly) : Halifax-Yarmouth, Moncton, Saint John's
4. Québec ([francophone] Assemblée des évêques catholiques du Québec) : Gatineau, Quebec, Rimouski, Montréal, Sherbrooke, Maronite Eparchy of Saint Maron of Montréal, Melkite Eparchy of the Salvator of Montréal

=== Mexico ===
Each region covers one or more ecclesiastical provinces :

1. Sur (South) : Acapulco
2. Pacífico-Sur : Antequera, Tuxtla Gutiérrez
3. Norte (North) : Chihuahua
4. Metropolitana (federal capital) : Archdiocese Ciudad Mexico (cfr. below)
5. Metro-Circundante : Tlalnepantla, Ciudad Mexico (only suffragans in province, so excepting Ciudad Mexico itself, which constitutes its own region above)
6. Vizcaya-Pacifico : Durango
7. Occidente (West) : Guadalajara
8. Noroeste (NW) : Hermosillo, Tijuana
9. Noreste (NE) : Monterrey
10. Golfo : Jalapa
11. Bajío : León, San Luis Potosí
12. Don Vasco : Morelia
13. Oriente (East) : Puebla de los Ángeles
14. Centro (Central) : Tulancingo
15. Sureste (SE) : Yucatán

=== United States ===
See: United States Conference of Catholic Bishops § Regions

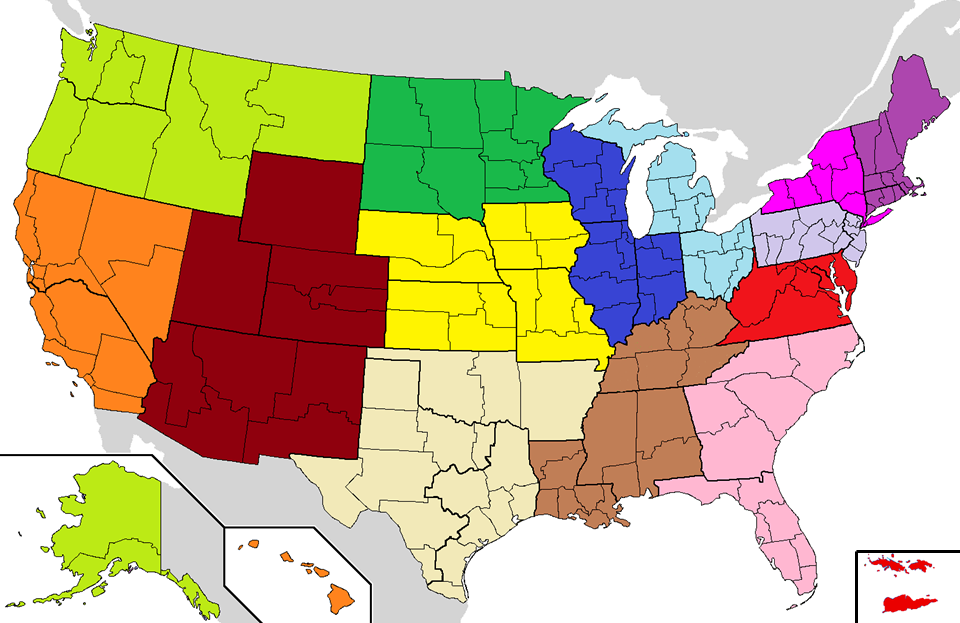
The USCCB divides the Latin Church dioceses of the United States into fourteen geographical regions and an overlapping fifteenth 'region' that consists of the Eastern Catholic jurisdictions.

The dioceses of the United States are grouped into fifteen regions which, strictly speaking, are not "ecclesiastical regions" established by the Holy See, but rather regions that the USCCB established for convenience. They are not canonically established bodies. Fourteen of the regions (numbered I through XIV) are geographically based, for the Latin Catholic dioceses, the Eastern Catholic eparchies (dioceses) constitute the overlapping 'Region' XV.

==== Bishops' Region I ====
Ecclesiastical province of Boston, comprising the states of Maine, Massachusetts, New Hampshire and Vermont.

- Metropolitan Archdiocese of Boston
  - Diocese of Burlington
  - Diocese of Fall River
  - Diocese of Manchester
  - Diocese of Portland
  - Diocese of Springfield in Massachusetts
  - Diocese of Worcester

Ecclesiastical province of Hartford, comprising the states of Connecticut and Rhode Island, as well as Fishers Island in the state of New York.

- Metropolitan Archdiocese of Hartford
  - Diocese of Bridgeport
  - Diocese of Norwich
  - Diocese of Providence

==== Bishops' Region II ====
Ecclesiastical province of New York, comprising the state of New York except for Fishers Island.

- Metropolitan Archdiocese of New York
  - Diocese of Albany
  - Diocese of Brooklyn
  - Diocese of Buffalo
  - Diocese of Ogdensburg
  - Diocese of Rochester
  - Diocese of Rockville Centre
  - Diocese of Syracuse

==== Bishops' Region III ====
Ecclesiastical province of Newark, comprising the state of New Jersey.

- Metropolitan Archdiocese of Newark
  - Diocese of Camden
  - Diocese of Metuchen
  - Diocese of Paterson
  - Diocese of Trenton

Ecclesiastical province of Philadelphia, comprising the state of Pennsylvania.

- Metropolitan Archdiocese of Philadelphia
  - Diocese of Allentown
  - Diocese of Altoona-Johnstown
  - Diocese of Erie
  - Diocese of Greensburg
  - Diocese of Harrisburg
  - Diocese of Pittsburgh
  - Diocese of Scranton

==== Bishops' Region IV ====
Ecclesiastical province of Baltimore, comprising most of the state of Maryland as well as the states of Delaware, Virginia and West Virginia.

- Metropolitan Archdiocese of Baltimore
  - Diocese of Arlington
  - Diocese of Richmond
  - Diocese of Wheeling-Charleston
  - Diocese of Wilmington

Ecclesiastical province of Washington, comprising the District of Columbia, 5 counties in southern Maryland, and the United States Virgin Islands.

- Metropolitan Archdiocese of Washington
  - Diocese of Saint Thomas, with see in Charlotte Amalie, U.S. Virgin Islands (the bishops of the diocese are members of the USCCB and have observer status in the Antilles Episcopal Conference)

==== Bishops' Region V ====
Ecclesiastical province of Louisville, comprising the states of Kentucky and Tennessee.

- Metropolitan Archdiocese of Louisville
  - Diocese of Covington
  - Diocese of Knoxville
  - Diocese of Lexington
  - Diocese of Memphis
  - Diocese of Nashville
  - Diocese of Owensboro

Ecclesiastical province of Mobile, comprising the states of Alabama and Mississippi.

- Metropolitan Archdiocese of Mobile
  - Diocese of Biloxi
  - Diocese of Birmingham in Alabama
  - Diocese of Jackson

Ecclesiastical province of New Orleans, comprising the state of Louisiana.

- Metropolitan Archdiocese of New Orleans
  - Diocese of Alexandria in Louisiana
  - Diocese of Baton Rouge
  - Diocese of Houma-Thibodaux
  - Diocese of Lafayette in Louisiana
  - Diocese of Lake Charles
  - Diocese of Shreveport

==== Bishops' Region VI ====
Ecclesiastical province of Cincinnati, comprising the state of Ohio.

- Metropolitan Archdiocese of Cincinnati
  - Diocese of Cleveland
  - Diocese of Columbus
  - Diocese of Steubenville
  - Diocese of Toledo
  - Diocese of Youngstown

Ecclesiastical province of Detroit, comprising the state of Michigan.

- Metropolitan Archdiocese of Detroit
  - Diocese of Gaylord
  - Diocese of Grand Rapids
  - Diocese of Kalamazoo
  - Diocese of Lansing
  - Diocese of Marquette
  - Diocese of Saginaw

==== Bishops' Region VII ====
Ecclesiastical province of Chicago, comprising the state of Illinois.

- Metropolitan Archdiocese of Chicago
  - Diocese of Belleville
  - Diocese of Joliet in Illinois
  - Diocese of Peoria
  - Diocese of Rockford
  - Diocese of Springfield in Illinois

Ecclesiastical province of Indianapolis, comprising the state of Indiana.

- Metropolitan Archdiocese of Indianapolis
  - Diocese of Evansville
  - Diocese of Fort Wayne-South Bend
  - Diocese of Gary
  - Diocese of Lafayette in Indiana

Ecclesiastical province of Milwaukee, comprising the state of Wisconsin.

- Metropolitan Archdiocese of Milwaukee
  - Diocese of Green Bay
  - Diocese of La Crosse
  - Diocese of Madison
  - Diocese of Superior

==== Bishops' Region VIII ====
Ecclesiastical province of Saint Paul and Minneapolis, comprising the states of Minnesota, North Dakota and South Dakota.

- Metropolitan Archdiocese of Saint Paul and Minneapolis
  - Diocese of Bismarck
  - Diocese of Crookston
  - Diocese of Duluth
  - Diocese of Fargo
  - Diocese of New Ulm
  - Diocese of Rapid City
  - Diocese of Saint Cloud
  - Diocese of Sioux Falls
  - Diocese of Winona-Rochester

==== Bishops' Region IX ====
Ecclesiastical province of Dubuque, comprising the state of Iowa.

- Metropolitan Archdiocese of Dubuque
  - Diocese of Davenport
  - Diocese of Des Moines
  - Diocese of Sioux City

Ecclesiastical province of Kansas City, comprising the state of Kansas.

- Metropolitan Archdiocese of Kansas City in Kansas
  - Diocese of Dodge City
  - Diocese of Salina
  - Diocese of Wichita

Ecclesiastical province of Omaha, comprising the state of Nebraska.

- Metropolitan Archdiocese of Omaha
  - Diocese of Grand Island
  - Diocese of Lincoln

Ecclesiastical province of Saint Louis, comprising the state of Missouri.

- Metropolitan Archdiocese of St. Louis
  - Diocese of Jefferson City
  - Diocese of Kansas City-Saint Joseph
  - Diocese of Springfield-Cape Girardeau

==== Bishops' Region X ====
Ecclesiastical province of Galveston-Houston, comprising the east and southeast parts of the state of Texas.

- Metropolitan Archdiocese of Galveston-Houston
  - Diocese of Austin
  - Diocese of Beaumont
  - Diocese of Brownsville
  - Diocese of Corpus Christi
  - Diocese of Tyler
  - Diocese of Victoria in Texas

Ecclesiastical province of San Antonio, comprising the west and north of the state of Texas.

- Metropolitan Archdiocese of San Antonio
  - Diocese of Amarillo
  - Diocese of Dallas
  - Diocese of El Paso
  - Diocese of Fort Worth
  - Diocese of Laredo
  - Diocese of Lubbock
  - Diocese of San Angelo

Ecclesiastical province of Oklahoma City, comprising the states of Arkansas and Oklahoma.

- Metropolitan Archdiocese of Oklahoma City
  - Diocese of Little Rock
  - Diocese of Tulsa

Personal Ordinariate of the Chair of St. Peter, comprising former Anglicans throughout the United States (and Canada).

- Personal Ordinariate of the Chair of St. Peter

==== Bishops' Region XI ====
Ecclesiastical province of Los Angeles, comprising the southern part of the state of California.

- Metropolitan Archdiocese of Los Angeles
  - Diocese of Fresno
  - Diocese of Monterey in California
  - Diocese of Orange (county, L.A.)
  - Diocese of San Bernardino
  - Diocese of San Diego

Ecclesiastical province of San Francisco, comprising the northern part of the state of California and the state of Hawaii (in Oceania).

- Metropolitan Archdiocese of San Francisco
  - Diocese of Oakland
  - Diocese of Sacramento
  - Diocese of San Jose in California
  - Diocese of Santa Rosa in California
  - Diocese of Stockton
  - also Diocese of Honolulu, in Polynesia, i.e. in Oceania

==== Bishops' Region XII ====
Ecclesiastical province of Anchorage-Juneau, comprising the state of Alaska.

- Metropolitan Archdiocese of Anchorage-Juneau
  - Diocese of Fairbanks

Ecclesiastical province of Portland in Oregon, comprising the states of Idaho, Montana and Oregon, except for the parts of Yellowstone National Park in the states of Idaho and Montana.

- Metropolitan Archdiocese of Portland in Oregon
  - Diocese of Baker
  - Diocese of Boise
  - Diocese of Great Falls-Billings
  - Diocese of Helena

Ecclesiastical province of Seattle, comprising the state of Washington

- Metropolitan Archdiocese of Seattle
  - Diocese of Spokane
  - Diocese of Yakima

==== Bishops' Region XIII ====
Ecclesiastical province of Denver, comprising the states of Colorado and Wyoming, as well as the parts of Yellowstone National Park in the states of Idaho and Montana.

- Metropolitan Archdiocese of Denver
  - Diocese of Cheyenne
  - Diocese of Colorado Springs
  - Diocese of Pueblo

Ecclesiastical province of Las Vegas, comprising the states of Nevada and Utah.

- Metropolitan Archdiocese of Las Vegas
  - Diocese of Reno
  - Diocese of Salt Lake City

Ecclesiastical province of Santa Fe, comprising the states of Arizona and New Mexico.

- Archdiocese of Santa Fe
  - Diocese of Gallup
  - Diocese of Las Cruces
  - Diocese of Phoenix
  - Diocese of Tucson

==== Bishops' Region XIV ====
Ecclesiastical province of Miami, comprising the state of Florida.

- Metropolitan Archdiocese of Miami
  - Diocese of Orlando
  - Diocese of Palm Beach
  - Diocese of Pensacola-Tallahassee
  - Diocese of St. Augustine
  - Diocese of Saint Petersburg
  - Diocese of Venice in Florida

Ecclesiastical province of Atlanta, comprising the states of Georgia, North Carolina, and South Carolina.

- Metropolitan Archdiocese of Atlanta
  - Diocese of Charleston
  - Diocese of Charlotte
  - Diocese of Raleigh
  - Diocese of Savannah

==== Bishops' "Region" XV – Eastern Catholic Eparchies and Archeparchies ====
This is not a geographical region and it does not consist of ecclesiastical provinces. Instead, it consists exclusively of US branches of various, generally Europe or Asia-based, particular Eastern Catholic Churches. See the Eastern Catholic Churches section (below) for their particular hierarchies.

Antiochian rites

Maronite Church

- Eparchy of Brooklyn (NYC, New York)
- Eparchy of Our Lady of Lebanon (St. Louis, Missouri)

Syriac Catholic Church

- Syrian Catholic Eparchy of Our Lady of Deliverance of Newark

Syro-Malankara Catholic Church

- Syro-Malankara Catholic Eparchy of St. Mary, Queen of Peace, of the United States of America and Canada

Armenian rite

Armenian Catholic Church

- Armenian Catholic Eparchy of Our Lady of Nareg in New York

Byzantine (Constantinopolitan) rites

Melkite Greek Catholic Church

- Eparchy of Newton

Romanian Catholic Church

- Eparchy of St. George's in Canton for Romanians

Ruthenian Catholic Church

Ecclesiastical province of the Ruthenian Catholic Metropolitan Church of Pittsburgh

- Metropolitan Archeparchy of Pittsburgh
  - Eparchy of Parma
  - Eparchy of Passaic
  - Holy Protection of Mary Eparchy of Phoenix

Ukrainian Greek Catholic Church

Ecclesiastical Province of Philadelphia

- Metropolitan Archeparchy of Philadelphia
  - Eparchy of Saint Nicholas in Chicago for Ukrainians
  - Eparchy of Saint Josaphat in Parma
  - Eparchy of Stamford

Syro-Oriental Rites

Chaldean Catholic Church

- Eparchy of St. Peter the Apostle of San Diego
- Eparchy of St. Thomas the Apostle of Detroit

Syro-Malabar Catholic Church

- St. Thomas Syro-Malabar Catholic Diocese of Chicago

== Sources and external links ==
- Teilkirchenverbände (Cann. 431 – 459) in the 1983 Codex Iuris Canonici
- Four ecclesiastical regions in Provostry Kaliningrad
