= Roman Catholic Ecclesiastical Region of Triveneto =

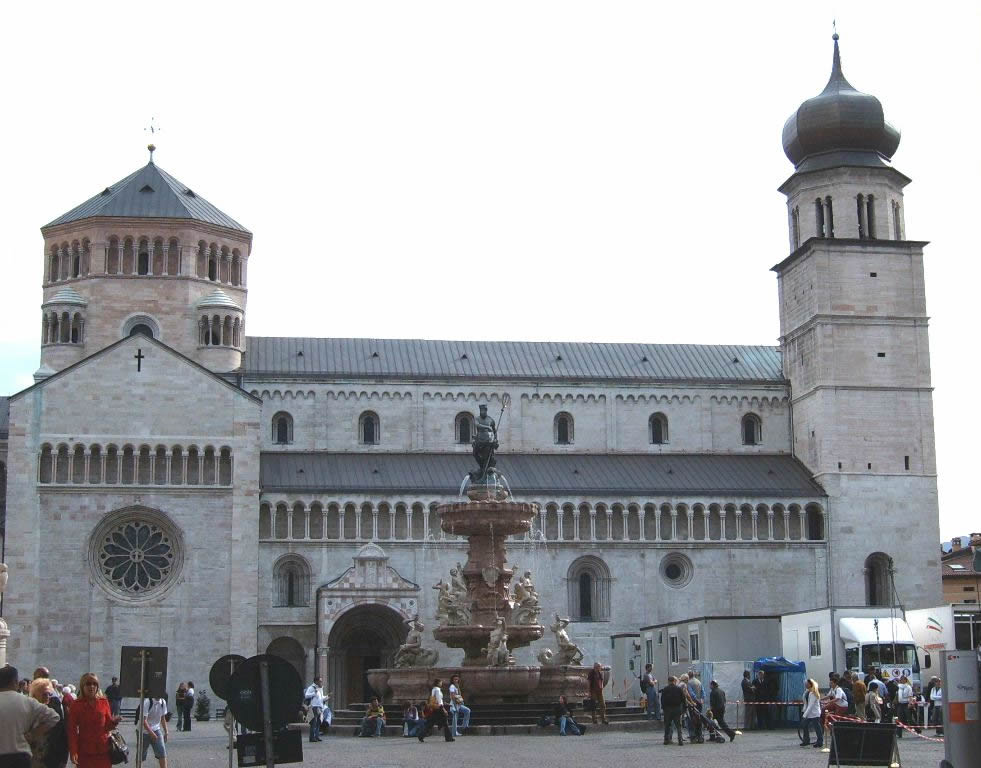
Trent Cathedral

The Roman Catholic Ecclesiastical Region of Triveneto (Regione ecclesiastica Triveneto) is one of the sixteen ecclesiastical regions of the Roman Catholic Church in Italy. It consists of four ecclesiastical provinces and a total of fifteen dioceses and covers the three secular regions of Trentino-Alto Adige/Südtirol, Friuli-Venezia Giulia and Veneto.

== Subdivisions ==
Province	Metropolitan	Suffragans
Gorizia	Gorizia	Trieste
Trento	Trento	Bolzano-Brixen
Udine	Udine	None
Venice	Venice	Adria-Rovigo, Belluno-Feltre, Chioggia, Concordia-Pordenone, Padua, Treviso, Verona, Vicenza, Vittorio Veneto
