= Ottavio Ferrari =

Italian archeologist, philologist and librarian

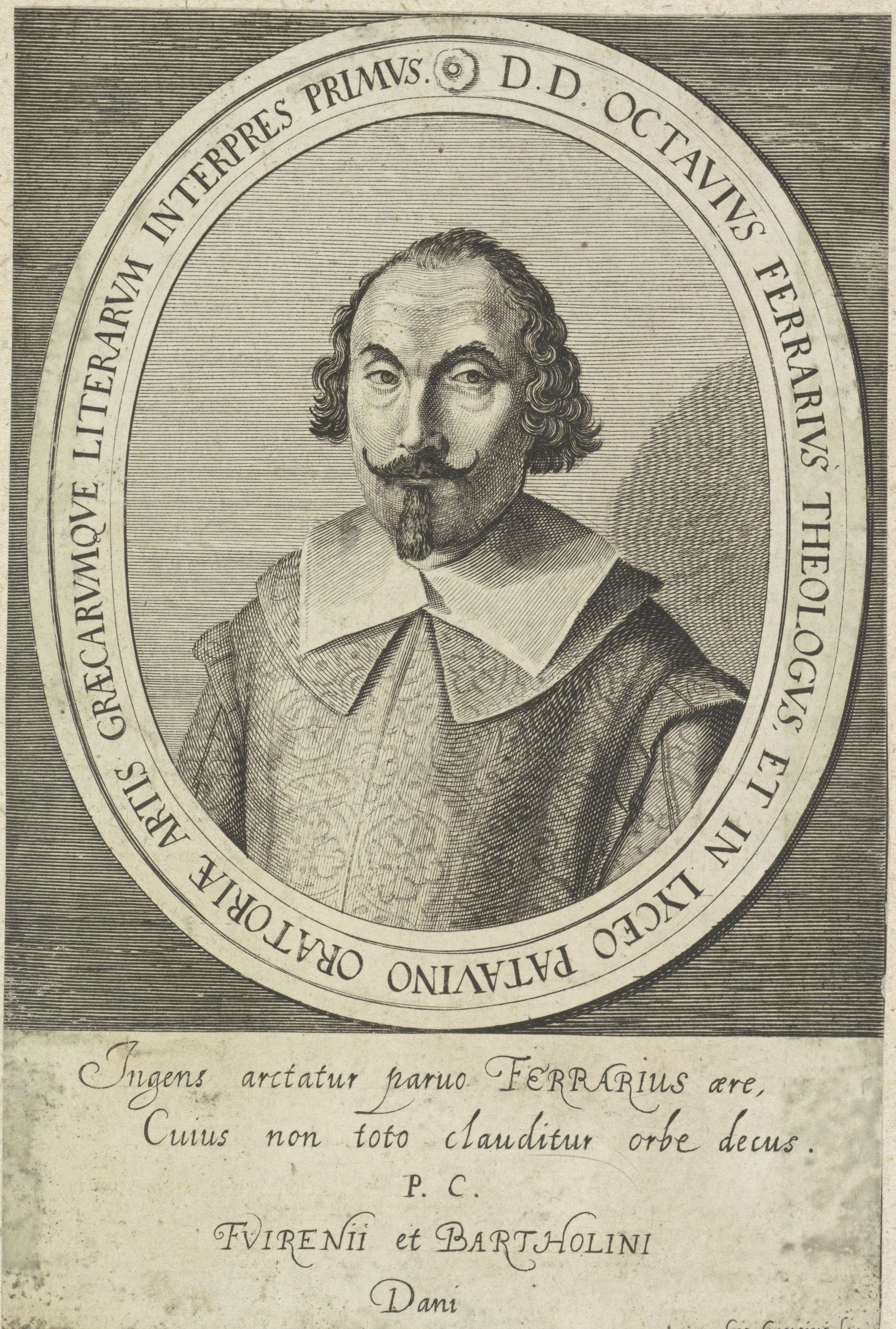
- Ottavio Ferrari
- Born: May 20, 1607; Milan, Duchy of Milan
- Died: 7 March 1682 (aged 74); Padua, Republic of Venice
- Occupations: Archaeologist; Philologist; Librarian
- Parent(s): Giulio Ferrari and Bianca Ferrari (née Bariola)

Academic work
- Era: Renaissance
- Discipline: Classics, Classical archaeology
- Institutions: University of Padua
- Notable works: De re vestiaria libri septem Electorum libri duo

Ottavio Ferrari (20 May 1607 – 7 March 1682) was an Italian archeologist, philologist, and librarian, nephew of Francesco Bernardino Ferrari.

== Biography ==
Ottavio Ferrari was born in Milan on May 20, 1607. Presented to Cardinal Federico Borromeo by his uncle, Francesco Bernardino, he was elected Professor of Rhetoric at the Collegium Ambrosianum in Milan at the age of 22. In 1634 he was appointed professor of philosophy and Greek literature at the University of Padua, which he helped to rescue from a state of decline. The esteem in which his services were held may be inferred from the extraordinary stipend conferred upon him, amounting to thousand florins. For a panegyric which he recited in praise of Christina, Queen of Sweden (Pallas Svecica, 1651), he was rewarded by a gold collar, valued at one thousand ducats. Another eulogy published in honour of Louis XIV obtained him a pension of five hundred crowns for five years. After the death of Giuseppe Ripamonti, the Senate of Milan appointed him Public Historiographer. He composed seven books on the history of the city; but the want of necessary documents, together with the fear of offending the House of Habsburg on the one hand, and his benefactor the king of France on the other, caused him to leave his papers unfinished and unpublished. He is principally esteemed as an archeologist, in which capacity he made himself known by several learned works. He died in Padua on March 7, 1682.

== Works ==
- De re vestiaria libri septem, 1642, to which he afterwards added Analecta, on the same subject, against Albert Rubens, and dissertations De Lucernis Sepulchralibus Veterum, De Pantomimis et Mimis, De Balneis et Gladiatoribus.
- Electorum libri duo, 1679; often reprinted, and much admired for erudition, but suspected by some to have been found by him among the papers of his uncle Francesco Bernardino.
- Origines Linguæ Italicæ. Patavii: typis Petri Mariae Frambotti bibliopolae. 1676.

== Bibliography ==
- Abraham Rees (1819). The Cyclopædia, Or, Universal Dictionary of Arts, Sciences, and Literature. Vol. 14. Longman, Hurst, Rees, Orme & Brown.
- Piovan, Francesco (1996). "FERRARI, Ottavio". Dizionario Biografico degli Italiani (in Italian). Vol. 46: Feducci–Ferrerio. Rome: Istituto dell'Enciclopedia Italiana. ISBN 978-88-12-00032-6.
- Picinelli, Filippo (1670). Ateneo dei letterati milanesi. Milan: Vigone. pp. 441–3.
- Hutton, James (1935). The Greek Anthology in Italy to the Year 1800. Ithaca: Cornell University Press. p. 269.
