= Lars Molin =

Lars Molin may refer to:

- Lars Molin (filmmaker) (1942–1999), Swedish filmmaker
- Lars Molin (ice hockey) (born 1956), Swedish ice hockey player
- Lasse-Maja (born 1785), Swedish thief and memoirist
