= Euganei =

Tribe

The Euganei (fr. Lat. Euganei, Euganeorum; cf. Gr. εὐγενής (eugenēs) 'well-born') were a group of populations, difficult to define, settled in the flat and mountainous areas of Northeast Italy, between the Eastern Alps and the Adriatic. With the arrival of the Adriatic Veneti they retreated to the Alpine valleys, blending in with the Rhaetians.

Pliny the Elder, referring to Cato, states that the Euganeans were divided into three lineages, the Triumpilini (Val Trompia), the Camunni (Val Camonica) and the Stoni. All these populations were Romanized before the beginning of the Common Era.

== History ==
It has been hypothesized that "Euganei" derives from the Greek εὐγενεῖς ("of noble lineage"), but a connection with Ingauni, a Ligurian population, is also possible. More likely, it is the term with which the Adriatic Venetians referred to a non-homogeneous group of tribes who, at the time of their arrival in Northeast Italy, occupied the vast area from Istria to Garda (or Oglio).

According to what is reported by the well-known legend on the origins of the Adriatic Venetians (handed down from a tragedy by Sophocles and taken up by Livy), it was the latter who drove out the Euganeans who, having retreated to the Alpine valleys, mixed with the Rhaetians; it cannot be ruled out, however, that "Reti" referred to the Euganeans themselves after this migration.

Further pressured by the arrival of the Gauls in the 5th century BC, the Euganean tribes maintained their independence until the end of the 2nd century BC, when Quintus Marcius Rex and Marcus Aemilius Scaurus subjugated the Stoni to Rome; Camuni and Triumpilini were definitively subjugated by Augustus in 16 BC. The Euganeans willingly accepted Roman domination, as demonstrated by the monuments erected in honor of the Augustan dynasty and the existence of a pagus called Livius by Livia.

According to Pliny, referring to Cato, the Euganeans were distributed in 34 oppida among which the "capital" Stoenos, an alpine locality which is difficult to identify, stood out. Pliny himself recalls how Verona was a city of Rhaetian and Euganean origin.

== Toponymy ==
The literature of the imperial era continued to use the term "Euganean" not as an ethnic one, but as a learned geographical name to indicate Northeast Italy, or as a synonym of Patavinus.

The expression "Euganean Hills", which indicates the group of reliefs located south-west of Padua, is instead an invention of the Renaissance, while "Venezia Euganea", coined by the linguist Graziadio Isaia Ascoli, is even later.

== See also ==
- Ancient peoples of Italy
- Polada culture

== Bibliography ==
- Micali, Giuseppe (1832). Storia degli antichi popoli italiani, Capo XIX. Euganei e Veneti (PDF) (in Italian). Vol. II. Firenze.
