= Francesco Bernardino Ferrari =

Italian archaeologist and scholar

Reverend Francesco Bernardino Ferrari
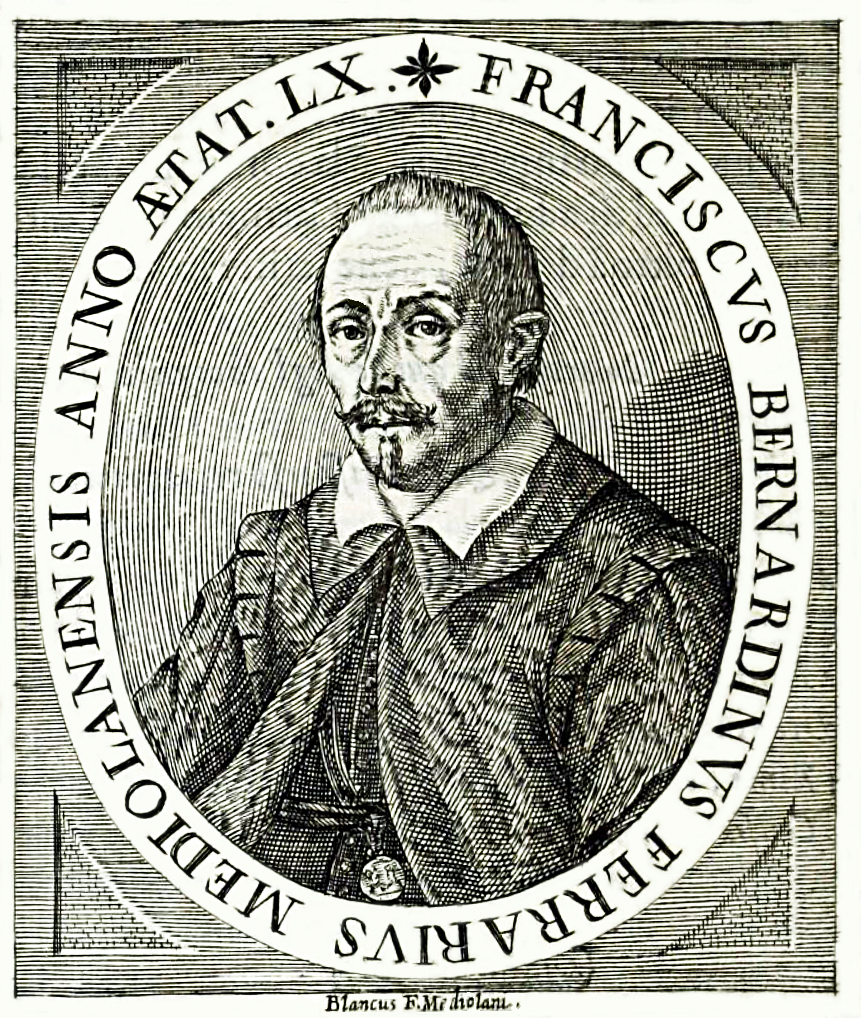
- Francesco Bernardino Ferrari
- Born: 1576; Milan, Duchy of Milan
- Died: 3 February 1669 (aged 92–93); Milan, Duchy of Milan
- Occupations: Catholic priest, archaeologist and scholar

Academic work
- Discipline: Church history
- Institutions: Biblioteca Ambrosiana
- Doctoral students: Ottavio Ferrari

Francesco Bernardino Ferrari was an Italian archaeologist, one of the first and most distinguished scholars of the Collegio Ambrosiano founded by Cardinal Federico Borromeo.

== Biography ==
Born in Milan in 1576, he entered the Congregation of the Oblates of Saints Ambrose and Charles. He studied philosophy and divinity, as well as the Latin and Greek languages, and was admitted as a doctor to the Ambrosian college. Federico Borromeo, archbishop of Milan, appointed him to travel into various parts of Europe to purchase the best books and manuscripts to form a library in Milan. Ferrari passed over part of Italy and Spain, and collected a great number of books, which laid the foundation of the famous Ambrosiana Library. About 1638 he was appointed director of the College of the Nobles, lately erected at Padua, which office he discharged two years, and then, on account of indisposition, returned to Milan. He died in Milan on February 3, 1669.

== Works ==
- De Antiquo Eccles. Epistolarum Genere libri tres (Milan, 1613);
- De Ritu Sacrarum Ecclesiae Catholicae concionum libri tres (Milan, 1620; Utrecht, 1692, cum praefatione Joannis Georgii Graevii);
- De Veterum acclamationibus et plausu libri septem (Milan, 1627; also in vol. VI of Graevius's Thesaur. Antiq. Rom.).

His writings are full of learning; he is very judicious in his conjectures and exact in his quotations.
