= Arnaldo Speroni degli Alvarotti =

Cleric

Arnaldo Speroni degli Alvarotti (1727-1801) was an Italian Roman Catholic cleric, serving as bishop of Rovigo.

== Biography ==
He was born in Padua, to the same family as the playwright Sperone Speroni. Arnaldo published a number of works:

- Storia ecclesiastica (translation of Godeau's book; 1761, Venice)
- Vita del vescovo di Vence (1761 in quarto)
- Ragionamenti sopra gli ordini minori e sacri (1783, Padua)
- Adriensium episcoporum series historico-chronologica, monumentis illustrata (1788 in quarto)
