= Diocese of Adria-Rovigo =

Roman Catholic diocese in Italy

Coordinates: 45.0500°N 12.0500°E

Diocese of Adria-Rovigo Dioecesis Adriensis-Rhodigiensis

Catholic
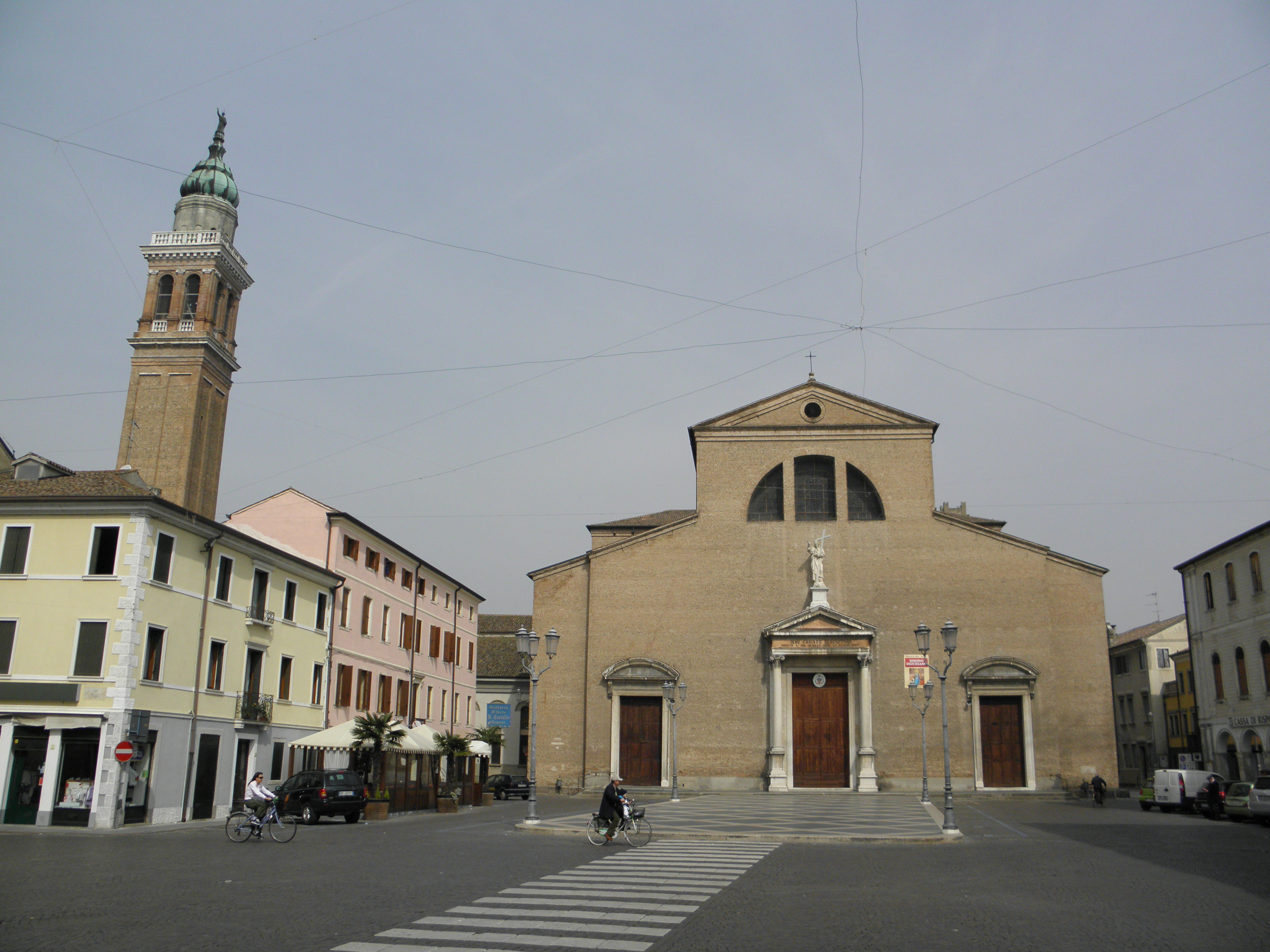
- Adria Cathedral

Location
- Country: Italy
- Ecclesiastical province: Venice

Statistics
- Area: 1,193 km^{2} (461 sq mi)
- Population: Total; Catholics: (as of 2022); 193,890 ▼; 190,000 (guess) ▼
- Parishes: 109

Information
- Denomination: Catholic
- Sui iuris church: Latin Church
- Rite: Roman Rite
- Established: 7th Century
- Cathedral: Cattedrale di SS. Pietro e Paolo (Adria)
- Co-cathedral: Concattedrale di S. Stefano Papa e Martire (Rovigo)
- Secular priests: 98 (diocesan) ▲27 (Religious Orders) ▲7 Permanent Deacons

Current leadership
- Pope: Leo XIV
- Bishop: Pierantonio Pavanello

Map

Website
- diocesiadriarovigo.it

The Diocese of Adria-Rovigo (Latin: Dioecesis Adriensis-Rhodigiensis) is a Latin diocese of the Catholic Church in the Triveneto. It has existed under this name since 1986. It is a Latin suffragan to the Patriarchate of Venice.

The comune of Adria is north of the Po River, some 88 km (56 mi) north of Ravenna. Its territory comprises roughly the northeastern Italian civil Province of Rovigo (Rovigo itself is not an episcopal see), and a part of one town in the Province of Padua.

== Ecclesiastical history ==
Tradition dates the preaching of the Gospel in Adria from the days of Saint Apollinaris, himself consecrated bishop by Saint Peter. The figure of this Bishop of Ravenna has a singular importance in the hagiographical legends of the northeast of Italy. Even if Emilia, Romagna and the territory around Venice were Christianized and had bishops before Piedmont, for example, their conversion does not go back beyond the end of the second century.

=== Establishment ===
The diocese was established by the 640s AD as the Diocese of Adria. The first known bishop of Adria is Gallonistus, who was present at a synod in Rome (649) under Pope Martin I. The Venerable Bede's Martyrology mentions a Saint Colianus, Bishop of Adria, but nothing is known about him.

==== Suffragan ====
The diocese of Adria was a suffragan of Ravenna until 1818, despite its location in the territory of Venice. On 1 May 1818, in the bull "De Salute", Pope Pius VII removed the diocese of Adria from subjection as a suffragan to the Archdiocese of Ravenna, and assigned it to the Patriarchate of Venice. In the same bull, the diocese of Adria lost one parish to the Diocese of Padova, and six to the Archdiocese of Ferrara. Adria gained two parishes from the Archdiocese of Ravenna, and two other parishes from the Archdiocese of Ferrara.

=== Population ===
The city of Adria had a population of c. 8,000 inhabitants in 1747. A list of the parishes of the diocese and their populations c. 1850, estimated at 140,000 persons, is given by Francesco de' Lardi. The diocese had in the early 20th century, a population of 190,400: 80 parishes, 300 churches, chapels and oratories; 250 secular priests, 72 seminarians, 12 regular priests and 9 lay-brothers; 90 confraternities; 3 boys schools (97 pupils) and 6 girls schools (99 pupils).

=== Renaming ===
In a decree of the Second Vatican Council, it was recommended that dioceses be reorganized to take into account modern developments. A project begun on orders from Pope John XXIII, and continued under his successors, was intended to reduce the number of dioceses in Italy and to rationalize their borders in terms of modern population changes and shortages of clergy. The change was made urgent because of changes made to the Concordat between the Italian State and the Holy See on 18 February 1984, and embodied in a law of 3 June 1985. Rovigo had become the capital of the civil province, and a more important center of social and political life than Adria, and an addition to the title of the diocese of Adria was decided upon. The change was approved by Pope John Paul II in an audience of 27 September 1986, and by a decree of the Sacred Congregation of Bishops of the Papal Curia on 30 September 1986. The diocese was renamed Diocese of Adria–Rovigo. At the same time, it seemed appropriate "for a more appropriate looking out for the good of souls" that the Basilica of S. Stephen Pope and Martyr be granted the dignity of being a co-cathedral.

== Cathedrals and notable churches ==
The cathedral of the diocese of Adria is the Cattedrale di SS. Pietro e Paolo, in Adria, province of Rovigo. The cathedral was administered and staffed by a corporation called the Chapter, consisting of an archpriest and seven canons; there were also twelve priests who carried out various religious functions. The archpriest served as pastor of the cathedral parish. By 1747, the number of canons had been increased to twelve.

It has a Co-Cathedral in the city of Rovigo, the Concattedrale di S. Stefano Papa e Martire, dedicated to the martyr Pope Stephen I. Rovigo was never a diocese.

In addition, there are several Minor Basilicas :

- Basilica di S. Apollinare, in Rovigo
- Basilica di San Bellino, Rovigo
- Basilica di S. Maria Assunta della Tomba in Adria
- Basilica del Santa Maria del Pilastrello in Lendinara, Rovigo (1911).

== Bishops ==
=== Diocese of Adria ===
Erected: 7th Century
Latin Name: Adriensis
Suffragan of Ravenna

==== to 1200 ====
...

- Gallionistus (649)

...

- Leo (or Leopertus) (861)
- Theodinus (877)

...

- Paulus (920)
- Gemerius (attested in 953)
- Joannes (attested 964)
- Astulf (ca. 972–992)
- Albericus (attested 1001)
- Petrus (attested 1016–1030)

...

- Benedictus (attested 1054–1055)
- Benzo
- Tuto (attested 1067)
- Ubertus (attested 1068)
- Petrus (c. 1073–1091)
- Jacobus (1091–1104)
- Isaac (1104–1115)
- Petrus Michael (attested 1116)
- Gregorius (attested 1125–1138)
- Florius (attested 1138)
- Gregorius (attested 1140–1154)

...

- Isaac (attested 1186–1198)

==== 1200 to 1500 ====
Metropolitan: Archdiocese of Ravenna

...

- Petrus (c. 1203)
- Rolandus Zabarelli (ca. 1210–1233)
- Guilelmus d'Este (1240–1257)
- Jacobus (1270–ca. 1277)
- Pellegrinus (1277–1280)
- Otholinus, O.Camald. (1280–1284)
- Bonifatius (ca. 1285–1286)
- Bonajuncta (Bonaggiunta) (1288–1306)
- Joannes, O.Humil. (1308–1317)
- Aegidius (1317)
- Salionus Buzzacarini (1318–1327)
- Exuperantius Lambertuzzi (1327–1329)
- Benvenuto Borghesini, O.P. (1329–1348)
- Aldobrandino d'Este (19 Mar 1348 – 18 Jan 1353)
- Giovanni da Siena, O.F.M. Conv. (attested 1 Nov 1352 – 1361)

...

- Antonio Contarini (1384 – 1386)
- Ugo Roberti (1386 – 1392)
- Rolandinus (1390)
- Joannes (Anselmini) (1392 – 1404)
- Jacobus Bertucci d'Obizzi (1404 – 1444)
- Bartolomeo Roverella (15 Jul 1444 – 1445)
- Giacomo degli Oratori (1445 – 1446)
- Biagio Novello, O.S.A. (1447 – 1465)
- Tito Novello (1465 – 1487)
- Nicolò Maria d'Este (31 May 1487 – 5 Aug 1507 Died)

==== 1500 to 1700 ====
- Beltrame Costabili (27 Aug 1507 – 1519 Died)
- Francesco Pisani (1519)
- Ercole Rangone (15 Jun 1519 – 27 May 1524 Resigned)
- Giambattista Bragadin (27 May 1524 – 23 May 1528 Died)
- Giovanni Domenico de Cupis (31 Aug 1528 – 10 Dec 1553 Died)
- Giulio Canani (26 Nov 1554 – 8 Feb 1591 Appointed, Bishop of Modena)
- Laurentius Laureti, O. Carm. (13 Feb 1591 – 1598 Died)
- Girolamo di Porzia (7 Aug 1598 – Aug 1612 Died)
- Ludovico Sarego (17 Sep 1612 – 24 Sep 1622 Resigned)
- Ubertinus Papafava (10 May 1623 – Oct 1631 Died)
- Germanicus Mantica (21 Feb 1633 – Feb 1639 Died)
- Giovanni Paolo Savio (19 Dec 1639 – Oct 1650 Died)
- Bonifacio Agliardi (Alliardi), C.R. (2 Aug 1655 – 1 Feb 1666 Died)
- Tommaso Retani (16 Mar 1667 – 1677 Resigned)
- Carlo Labia, C.R. (13 Sep 1677 – 29 Nov 1701 Died)

==== 1700 to 1900 ====
- Filippo della Torre (6 Feb 1702 – 25 Feb 1717 Died)
- Antonio Vaira (12 Jul 1717 – 8 Oct 1732 Died)
- Giovanni Soffietti, C.R.M. (19 Jan 1733 – 7 Sep 1747 Died)
- Pietro Maria Suárez (20 Nov 1747 – 19 Jun 1750 Died)
- Pellegrino Ferri (16 Nov 1750 – 30 Sep 1757 Died)
- Giovanni Francesco Mora, C.O. (2 Oct 1758 – 15 Jan 1766 Died)
- Arnaldo Speroni degli Alvarotti, O.S.B. (2 Jun 1766 – 2 Nov 1800 Died)
- Federico Maria Molin (24 Aug 1807 – 16 April 1819)
- Carlo Pio Ravasi, O.S.B. (8 Jan 1821 Confirmed – 2 Oct 1833)
- Antonio-Maria Calcagno (19 Dec 1834 Confirmed – 8 Jan 1841)
- Bernardo Antonino Squarcina, O.P. (27 Jan 1842 – 22 Dec 1851)
- Giacomo Bignotti (27 Sep 1852 – 7 Mar 1857 Died)
- Camillo Benzon (27 Sep 1858 – 10 Dec 1866 Died)
- Pietro Colli (27 Mar 1867 – 30 Oct 1868 Died)
- Emmanuele Kaubeck (27 Oct 1871 – 31 Aug 1877 Died)
- Giovanni Maria Berengo (31 Dec 1877 – 12 May 1879 Appointed, Bishop of Mantova)
- Giuseppe Apollonio (12 May 1879 – 25 Sep 1882 Appointed, Bishop of Treviso)
- Antonio Polin (25 Sep 1882 – 18 May 1908 Died)

==== since 1900 ====
- Tommaso Pio Boggiani, O.P. (31 Oct 1908 – 1912)
- Anselmo Rizzi (4 Jun 1913 – 19 Oct 1934 Died)
- Guido Maria Mazzocco (12 Nov 1936 – 8 Nov 1968 Died)
- Giovanni Mocellini (1 Jan 1969 – 12 Mar 1977 Resigned)
- Giovanni Maria Sartori (12 Mar 1977 – 1987)
- Martino Gomiero (7 May 1988 – 11 Oct 2000 Retired)

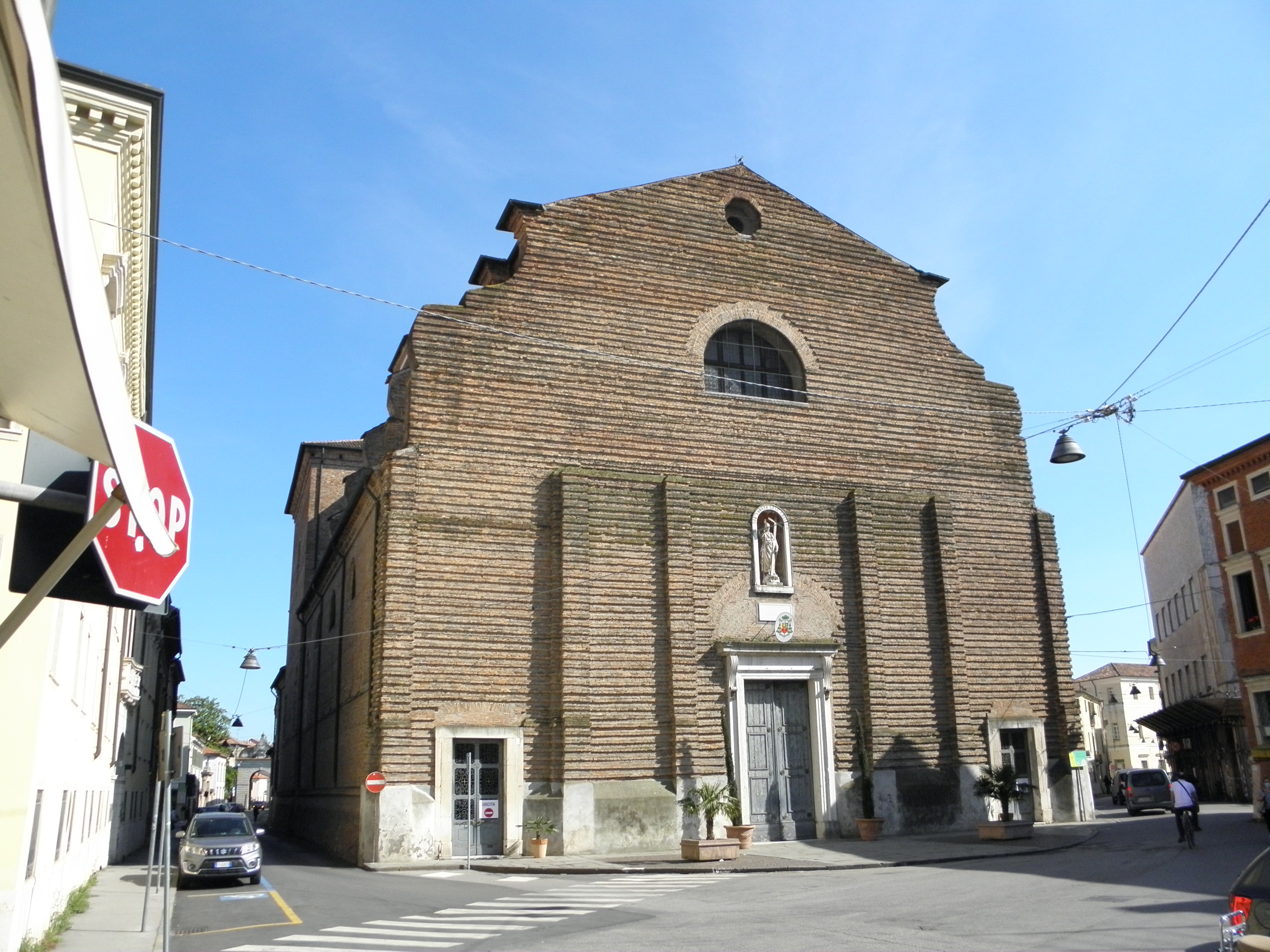
Co-cathedral in Rovigo

=== Diocese of Adria-Rovigo ===
Name Changed: 30 September 1986
Latin Name: Adriensis-Rhodigiensis
Metropolitan: Patriarchate of Venice

- Andrea Bruno Mazzocato (11 Oct 2000 – 3 Dec 2003 Appointed, Bishop of Treviso)
- Lucio Soravito de Franceschi (29 May 2004 – 23 Dec 2015 Retired)
- Pierantonio Pavanello (23 Dec 2015 – )

== See also ==
- Roman Catholic Archdiocese of Ravenna-Cervia
- Patriarchate of Venice
- Adria, comune of civil province of Rovigo.
- Rovigo, commune.

== Sources ==
- Bocchi, Francesco (1858). Della sede episcopale di Adria Veneta. (in Italian and Latin). Adria: G. Vianello, 1858.
- Buonaiuti, Ernesto. "Adria." The Catholic Encyclopedia. Vol. 1. New York: Robert Appleton Company, 1907. Retrieved: 2016-10-16.
- Cappelletti, Giuseppe (1854), Le chiese d'Italia Volume decimo (10) Venezia. Giuseppe Antonelli, pp. 9–102. (in Italian)
- De' Lardi, Francesco (1851). Serie cronologica dei Vescovi di Adria. (in Italian). Venice: Bonvecchiato, 1851.
- Eubel, Conradus, ed. (1913). Hierarchia catholica (in Latin). Vol. 1 (second ed.). Münster: Libreria Regensbergiana.
- Eubel, Conradus, ed. (1914). Hierarchia catholica (in Latin). Vol. 2 (second ed.). Münster: Libreria Regensbergiana.
- Eubel, Conradus; Gulik, Guilelmus (1923). Hierarchia catholica (in Latin). Vol. Tomus 3 (second ed.). Münster: Libreria Regensbergiana.
- Gams, Pius Bonifatius (1873). Series episcoporum Ecclesiae catholicae: quotquot innotuerunt a beato Petro apostolo (in Latin). Ratisbon: Typis et Sumptibus Georgii Josephi Manz. p. 768-770.
- Gauchat, Patritius (Patrice) (1935). Hierarchia catholica (in Latin). Vol. IV (1592-1667). Münster: Libraria Regensbergiana.
- Groto, Luigi; Bocchi, Francesco Girolamo (1830). Sulla condizione antica e moderna di Adria città del regno lombardo-veneto (in Italian). Vol. primo (seconda ed.). Venezia: Molinari. ISBN 9780371308028.
- Groto, Luigi; Bocchi, Francesco Girolamo (1831). Sulla condizione antica e moderna di Adria città del regno lombardo-veneto (in Italian). Vol. secondo (2) (seconda ed.). Venezia: Molinari.
- Kehr, Paul Fridolin (1906). Italia Pontificia Vol. V: Aemilia, sive Provincia Ravennas. (in Latin). Berlin: Weidmann. pp. 188–199.
- Lanzoni, Francesco (1927). Le diocesi d'Italia dalle origini al principio del secolo VII (an. 604). Faenza: F. Lega. (in Italian)
- Ritzler, Remigius; Sefrin, Pirminus (1952). Hierarchia catholica medii et recentis aevi V (1667-1730) (in Latin). Patavii: Messagero di S. Antonio.
- Ritzler, Remigius; Sefrin, Pirminus (1958). Hierarchia catholica medii et recentis aevi VI (1730-1799) (in Latin). Patavii: Messagero di S. Antonio.
- Rondina, Aldo (1983). Una diocesi millenaria: ricerche e appunti sui vescovi di Adria (in Italian). Rovigo: Minedi.
- Schwartz, Gerhard (1907). Die Besetzung der Bistümer Reichsitaliens unter den sächsischen und salischen Kaisern: mit den Listen der Bischöfe, 951-1122. Leipzig: B.G. Teubner. pp. 161–162. (in German)
- Speroni, Arnaldo (1788). Adriensium episcoporum series historico-chronologica monumentis illustrata (in Latin). Pavia: Jo: Antonii Conzatti.
- Ughelli, Ferdinando; Coleti, Niccolò (1717). Italia sacra sive De Episcopis Italiae, et insularum adjacentium (in Latin). Vol. Tomus secundus. Venezia: apud Sebastianum Coleti. pp. 397–409.
- Zattoni, Girolamo (1905–06) "Il valore storico della Passio di S. Apollinare e la fondazione dell episcopato a Ravenna e in Romagna," in: Rivista storico-critica delle scienze teologiche, vol. 1 (Roma 1905), pp. 662–677; Vol. 2 (Roma 1906), pp. 179–200 and 677-691.
