= L'imago è questa di colei ch'al core =

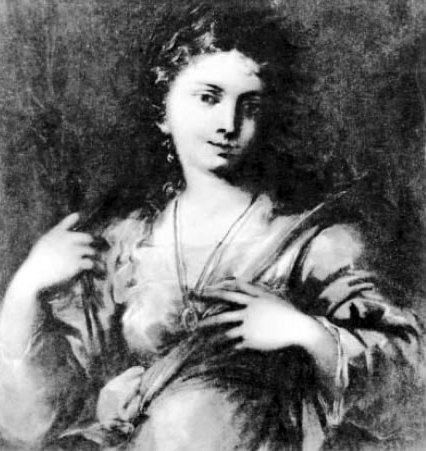
Image presumed to be Sarra Copia Sullam. See "The portrait."

L'imago è questa di colei ch'al core is a sonnet composed by Sarra Copia Sullam (c. 1590/1592-1641). Sarra was an Italian-Jewish poet born into a wealthy family in a Venetian ghetto during Counter-Reformation in Italy. Her father, Simon Copio, was a banker and trader, giving her family semi-prominence in the ghetto, and giving Sarra access to her education. Sarra had a younger sister named Ester. Her father passed away in 1606. Her mother, Ricca Copia, took over his business. He had no sons, making Sarra his heir. Sarra married her husband, Giacob Sulam, in 1609. Sarra began and hosted a literary salon in 1618 that met and conversed about various writings and literature. The salon encouraged open communication and intellectual conversation surrounding a wide range of topics including: religion and religious beliefs, viewpoints, morals, and speculations.

Preceding the making of the salon, Sarra entered a correspondence (letter exchange) with Ansaldo Ceba (c. 1565–1622), a Genoese writer and Catholic priest/Christian monk. After reading his 1615 work La Reina Esther, she was inspired to reach out to Ansaldo to express her love of the poem and ask for his guidance to further her own writing skills. Many of Sarra's salon members were friends or colleagues of Ansaldo's of which he persuaded to join her salon. The correspondence between Sarra and Ansaldo lasted four years, from May 1618 to April 1622. Over the course of their letters, Ansaldo persistently tried to convert Sarra to Christianity, believing she would not reach Heaven as a Jewish woman. Ansaldo wanted their relationship to become more than spiritual and intellectual and ascend to physical. Sarra denied his religious and romantic advances. Over the course of their correspondence, their dynamic takes on multiple reciprocal roles: teacher/student, lover/beloved, father/daughter, master/servant. These roles and the sonnets written by Sarra stem from neoplatonic ideas of love that were prevalent during Sarra and Ansaldo's time. Ansaldo sent Sarra his portrait in Letter 16, composed on the 9th of November, 1619. Despite Ansaldo's protests that she not, Sarra sent her portrait accompanied by a sonnet to Ansaldo in April 1620, of which employs the language of Petrarchism.

In 1620, Ansaldo began to grow jealous and uncomfortable with the prevalence of Sarra's salon. He began to attack Sarra's honor and virtue, as well as her character, talent, and her legacy. In the spring of 1621, Ansaldo's health begins to decline, and so does Sarra's. In 1621, Sarra wrote and published her Manifesto (her only published work under her own name) after being accused of heresy by a close friend and one of her salon members Baldassare Bonifaccio. Shortly after this in 1622, the salon meetings ceased. Under religious and intellectual attacks himself, Ansaldo distanced himself from Sarra in order to preserve his own legacy. In April 1622, Ansaldo wrote Sarra two brief letters that ceased their correspondence altogether. Sometime in 1622, Lettere D'Ansaldo Ceba Scritte a Sarra Copia was created by Ansaldo. In October 1622, Ansaldo dies. His work was published postmortem in 1623 by his friend, Marcantonio Doria, whom the book was dedicated to. The work only contained his letters to Sarra along with some sonnets written by Sarra, but none of the letters she wrote to him. "The image is that of her who, in her heart" is the last sonnet composed by Sarra to be featured in the book. Sarra and Ansaldo never met in person. Sarra stepped away from writing and the public sphere after the accusation, and the rest of her life is unknown.

== The portrait ==
There are three portraits of Sarra that have not survived. A fourth portrait, with an unknown composition date, is the surviving and published one (as seen above). It was made by Valerio Castello sometime in the late 1660s as a recreation of the third of the original portraits made by Bernardo Castello, his father, and commissioned by Sarra herself in 1622. Bernardo was a close friend of Ansaldo's. Though the surviving portrait of Sarra was published in one of Valerio Castello's art catalogs, it could have been created or copied by a different artist by the name of Antonio Lagorio. The portrait was removed from the updated version of Valerio's art catalog in 2004 by Alessandro Morandotti.

The sonnet below was created by Sarra to describe the portrait she had sent to Ansaldo.

== The sonnet ==
A sonnet written by Sarra, two years before the correspondence ceased, is translated below. Sarra sent this sonnet sometime in 1620, possibly in March, along with her portrait. It was published in Lettere D'Ansaldo Ceba Scritte a Sarra Copia alongside Letter 22 (written by Ansaldo, there are no published letters written by Sarra) and a sonnet in response by Ansaldo.

(Original Italian)

L'imago è questa di colei ch'al core

Porta l'imago tua sola scolpita,

Che con la mano al seno al mondo addita:

“Qui porto l'Idol mio, ciascun l'adore.”

Sostien con la sinistra arme d'amore {5}

Che fur tuoi carmi; il loco ov'è ferita

La destra accenna; e pallida e smarrita

Dice: “Ansaldo, il mio cor per te si more.”

Prigionera se ′n viene a te davante

Chiedendo aita, et a te porge quella {10}

Catena ond'è ′l mio amor fido e costante.

Deh, l'ombra accogli di tua fida Ancella

E goda almeno il finto mio sembiante

Quel che nega a quest'occhi iniqua stella.

(English Translation)

The image is that of her who, in her heart,

Carries, sculpted, your image alone;

And who, with her hand on her breast, indicates to the world:

“Here I carry my idol, let everyone adore him.”

With her left hand she supports love's weapons {5}

That were your poems; her right hand signals

The place where she is wounded; pale and bewildered,

She says: “Ansaldo, my heart is dying for you.”

She comes before you as a prisoner

Asking help and she offers you that {10}

Chain from which my love is faithful and constant.

Oh, accept the shadow of your faithful handmaiden,

And may my feigned appearance enjoy, if anything,

What an inauspicious star denies these eyes.

== Understanding the sonnet and its context ==
{First stanza; 1-4} Sarra begins the sonnet establishing the "image of her," meaning the woman in the portrait she sent Ansaldo paired with this sonnet. "Her" is Sarra speaking of herself in the third person, or describing the portrait of the woman (who is Sarra herself). The woman in the portraits' heart carries Ansaldo's "image," which is the portrait he had sent to Sarra previously, as this is all Sarra has to know of what he looks like. The woman in the portrait has her hand over her heart ("breast") where she carries her idol (Ansaldo) and thus boasts of him to everyone in the world. She wishes that everyone would love him and idolize his work as she does. She is not ashamed of how she feels about Ansaldo and is in fact proud of her feelings. This is the language of Petrarchism, a style of poetry created by Petrarch.

{Second stanza; 5-8} "Loves weapons" indicate the letters and other various works of Ansaldo's that he has written, of which the woman in the portrait is holding in her left hand. They are so significant to her that they are what made her fall in love with him. Sarra writes that she is "pale" and "bewildered"—symptoms of 'lovesickness' and 'melancholia'--which in Sarras' time were used to describe the way one felt love for another in the absence of modern science. She says that she is "wounded", as if she were struck by 'Cupids Arrow' through her heart making her yearn so deeply for Ansaldo that she feels as if she is dying for his love and presence. This is another allusion that relays how love was perceived and known at the time. Conclusions were made mainly based on religious figures and religious stories of love portrayals. Her heart, which has that of his image, is dying for him to connect with her, and to be with her physically in person.

{Third stanza; 9-11} The portrait of the woman comes before Ansaldo as a "prisoner" of his love and the yearning she feels to be with him. She is a prisoner of the paper she is incased in. Sarra herself is a prisoner of Ansaldo's love and her own yearning for him as well as a prisoner to their distance. She asks Ansaldo for his help, placing him in the role of a fatherly confidant and her as a daughter seeking advice and wisdom from her elder and superior intellectual. She offers Ansaldo her "chain" (the necklace around her neck) as an acceptance to the offering of servitude he ended all of his letters to her with. This in turn makes her his servant as well, making their relationship an equal, reciprocal, and consensual extending of loyalty and complete surrender on both sides. This is an example of the master/servant reciprocal courtly love role Sarra and Ansaldo take on for one another. She offers him this chain as a symbol of her everlasting and infinite love for him.

{Fourth stanza; 12-14} Sarra calls the portrait her "handmaiden", once again calling back to the courtly love role of a servant she placed herself in. Additionally, she adds that it is a "shadow", meaning that the portrait is a phantom of her physical form, and goes on further to call it her "feigned appearance." The portrait is a fake version of the real Sarra, but the only version of Sarra that will ever get to see Ansaldo's physical person. The portrait is the luckiest version of Sarra, as the portrait is the one that is with Ansaldo. An "inauspicious star" (or fate) denies Sarra's physical form the ability to see Ansaldo for herself, so her portrait is her faked stand-in.

== Sonnet in response (by Ansaldo) ==
Below is the sonnet Ansaldo sent back to Sarra after receiving her sonnet and portrait. It was accompanied by Letter 22, sent on April 18, 1620.

(Original Italian)

Felice stella a l’infelice ardore,

Ch’a vedermi da presso il cor t’invita,

La tua da la mia vista ha dipartita

Tu sei de gli anni tuoi sul più bel fiore

Et hai la guancia ardente e colorita; {5}

Io son sul terminar de la mia vita

Et ho le fiamme dentro e ’l ghiaccio fuore.

Ché se pur luminosa e sfavillante

La voce mia da lunge e la favella

Ti sembra risonar per l’aria errante, {10}

Tu sei la fiamma, o Sarra, e la facella,

Onde s’accende in me la lingua amante,

Mentre che solo il tuo bel nome appell (English Translation)

(English Translation)

A lucky star that, with its unlucky burning,

Stirs your heart to see me from near

Has separated your sight from mine

And closed my night to your splendor.

You are in the years of your greatest bloom {5}

And have a burning and glowing cheek;

I am near the end of my life

And have flames inside and ice outside.

Even if my voice from far away and my speech

Seem to you to be luminous and sparkling

And to resonate in the moving air, {10}

It is you, O Sarra, who are the flame and the torch

That kindle in me a loving tongue

To call out your fair name alone.

== Understanding the sonnet in response ==
{1-4} Ansaldo begins by agreeing with Sarra that fate is what will not let them be together in person. {5-8} He tells Sarra that she is only at the beginning of her long and lustrous career, while he is at the end of his. {9-14} He tells Sarra that the only reason his words are so grand and "loving" is because she is the one that supports the continuation of his writing (such as La Reina Esther), and for that, he is forever only hers.
