= The desire to know things, which often lodges =

"The desire to know things, which often lodges" (Italian: Quel desio di saper ch'in cor gentile) is a sonnet by the Venetian Jewish poet Sarra Copia Sullam, commonly identified as Sonnet 31. It was written in early seventeenth-century Venice in the context of a public dispute between Copia Sullam and her former preceptor and salon participant Numidio Paluzzi.

The poem forms part of a broader of work in which Copia Sullam reflects on intellectual inquiry, reputation, and accusations directed against her, including charges of heresy and plagiarism. Scholars have interpreted the sonnet as both a literary response and a defense of her intellectual integrity.

== Dispute with Numidio Paluzzi ==
Numidio Paluzzi was a preceptor and participant in her Sarra Copia Sullam's literary salon. During a period of financial and professional difficulty, Copia Sullam became Paluzzi's patron and provided him financial and medical support to deal with his French disease.

While under Copia Sullam's household, he conspired with a laundress Paula Furlana to swindle furniture and money fromp her property. In 1624, Copia Sullam discovered the conspiracy and severed ties with Paluzzi as well as his conspirators. In response, Paluzzi, along with collaborators, published writings that criticized Copia Sullam, including a manuscript Le Seride, or, Satires on Sarra. These publications contributed to a broader public controversy surrounding her reputation. Paluzzi later died of syphilis in the summer of 1625.

=== Notice of Parnassus ===
This dispute is also represented in Avisi di Parnaso ("Notices of Parnassus"). Published by Trajano Boccalini, and edited by Giulia Solinga, the text is a 1626 Italian satirical manuscript that functions as a mixed biographical and fictitious account to contemporary social and political figures surrounding Sarra Copia Sullam.

Structurally, the "Notices" are made up of prose and verse organized as a mock trial on Mount Parnassus. Narratively, Apollo summons the dead Paluzzi to appear before the judges, Colonna and Gambara, whom were historical female literary figures to answer for his crimes against Sarra Copia Sullam.

Due to the detailed account of the controversy, some scholars have suggested that "Solinga" may be a pseudonym or anagram for a group of Sarra Copia Sullam's associates, or of herself. Out of 72 sonnets, 5 were clearly authored by Sarra Copia Sullam.

== Sonnet 31 ==
(Original Italian)

Quel desio di saper ch'in cor gentile

Sovente alberga ad ingannevol luce

Mi trasse; indi, seguendo infido duce,

Tardi di cor vilan scorgei lo stile.

Fummi il costui disagio qual focile

Ch'ognhor colpiami il cor; ma chi m'induce

A dir quali esche ardesse se riluce

Pur anco illustre l'oprar mio virile?

Mi tacio donque e m'ascrivo a la schiera

De' Melciadi Focioni se non lece

Ch'un empio ingrato altro premio m'apporte,

Di cui non so qual inferna megera

L'alma ingombrassi che d'honore in vece

Danno mi procurasse, oltraggio e morte.

(English Translation)

The desire to know things, which often lodges

In a genteel heart, drew me

To the deceptive light: there, following a faithless leader,

I later perceived the ways of a boorish heart.

His discomfort was, for me, like a flint

That struck my heart every hour; but who induces me

To say what kinds of tinder ignited it

If my courageous actions shine as ever illustrious?

I keep quiet, then, and I enroll in the company

Of those like Mechiades and Photius if it is impermissible

For an impious ingrate to show me another reward;

I do not know what infernal Megaera

Would so encumber his soul as to cause me not honor,

But harm, offense, and death.

=== Analysis ===
The sonnet has been interpreted as a reflection on intellectual curiosity and misplaced trust. In the opening lines, Sarra Copia Sulllam contrasts “genteel heart" to Paluzzi's “boorish” one as if to show that her curiosity is common beyond her faith and one that is legitimate to the deceptive Paluzzi.

The second quatrain shows Copia Sullam's in depth knowledge and pity of Paluzzi's health conditions, it “struck” her heart to help him out as a result.

Third quatrain reveals that Copia Sullam had stayed quiet regarding the scandal but she was wary whether Paluzzi could further wronged her.

The last quatrain communicates Sarra Copia Sulam's frustration with his dishonor, comparing his co-conspirator, Furlana, to a Greek fury that poisoned Paluzzi's mind against her.
