= Santa Maria della Celestia =

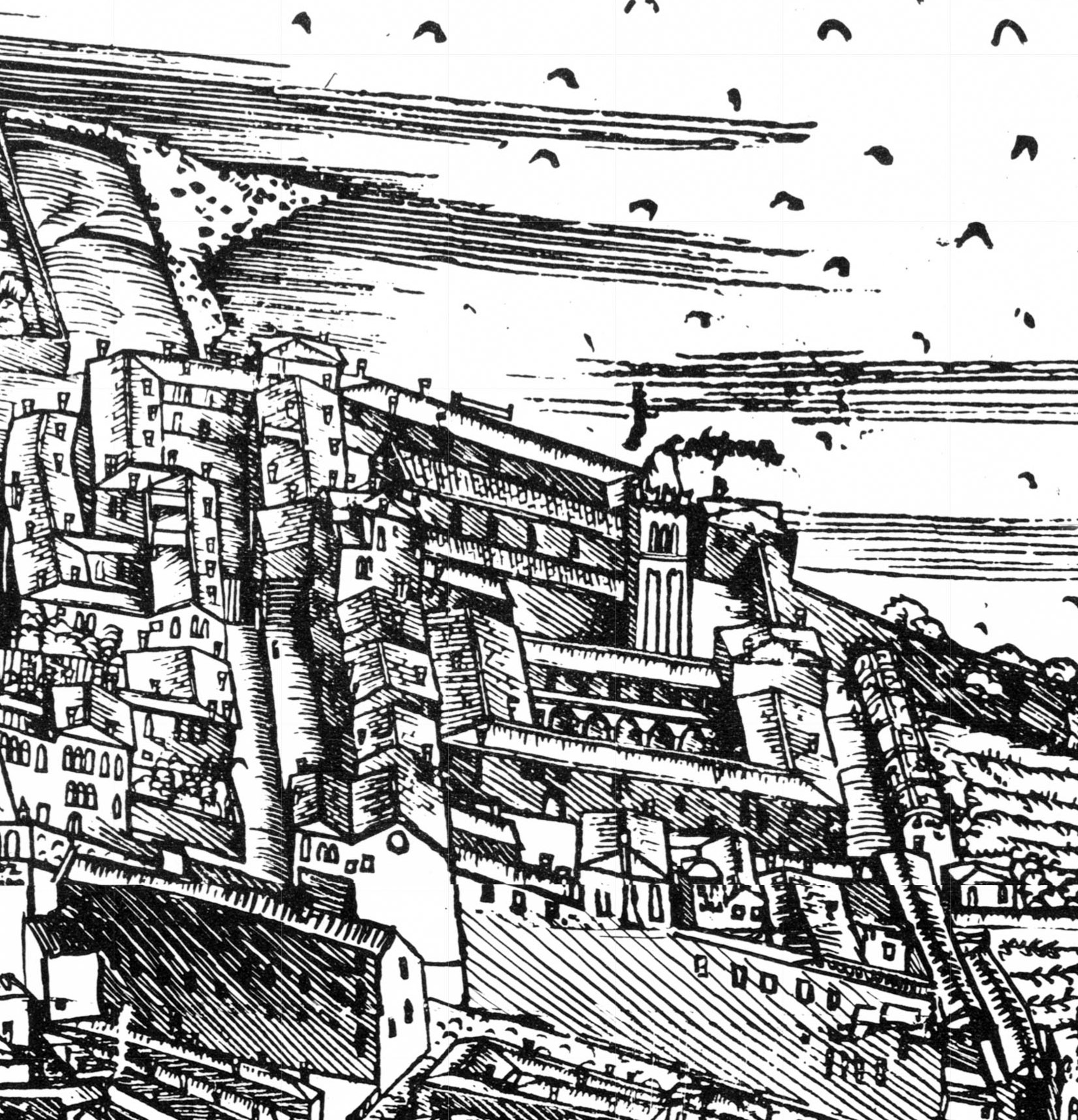
The church in a veduta of Venice by Jacopo de' Barbari, 1500.

Santa Maria Assunta in Cielo, Santa Maria Celeste or Santa Maria della Celestia was a Roman Catholic church in Venice, facing the Campo de la Celestia in the Castello district, just east of San Francesco della Vigna. It was dedicated to the Assumption of Mary.

== History ==
It was founded in 1119 by the Celsi and completed in 1239 during Jacopo Tiepolo's term as doge. In 1237 it was annexed by a Cistercian nunnery that had moved from Piacenza to Venice, a cell of the Abbey of Chiaravalle della Colomba. Its nuns soon became known for immorality and were repeatedly (but in vain) reprimanded by the church authorities. Early in the 16th century they moved under the jurisdiction of the Diocese of Castello.

In 1569 a fire broke out in the nearby Arsenal, damaging the church. In 1581 work began on a rebuild to designs by Vincenzo Scamozzi inspired by Rome's Pantheon. However, the architect and the nuns fell out and the project ground to a halt. In 1606 the church was razed again and rebuilt on a Latin cross plan with three side chapels and three front chapels before being reconsecrated in 1611. It housed artworks by Andrea Vicentino, Jacopo Palma il Giovane, Antonio Foler and Domenico Chiesa and the tombs of the humanist Trifone Gabriel, admiral Carlo Zeno and doge Lorenzo Celsi.

The complex was suppressed in 1810 under the Napoleonic regime and transferred to the navy, with the church later demolished and its tombs' remains dispersed at the ossuary of Sant'Ariano. Designed by Andrea Palladio in 1571, the nunnery's cloister survives.
