= Ansaldo Cebà =

Italian Baroque poet (1565–1623)

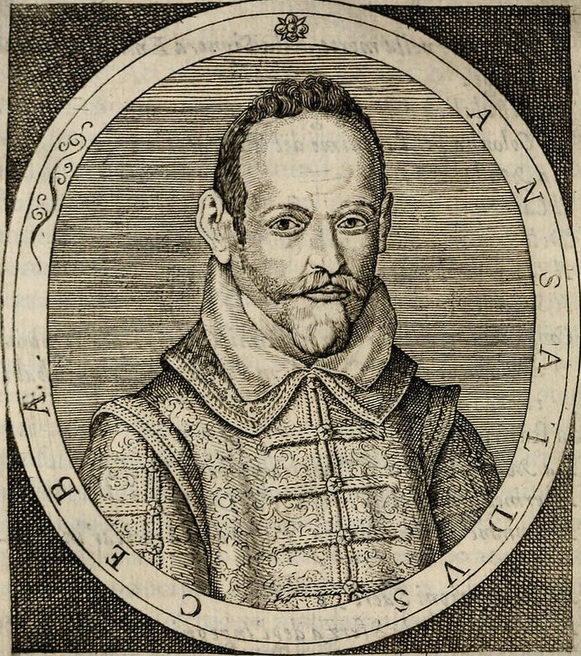
- Portrait of Ansaldo Cebà. From the book "Le glorie degli Incogniti", 1647
- Born: 1565; Genoa, Republic of Genoa
- Died: April 1623 (aged 57–58); Genoa, Republic of Genoa
- Education: University of Padua
- Occupations: Poet; Writers; Dramatist
- Writing career
- Language: Italian language
- Period: 17th century; Baroque literature
- Genres: Poetry; drama; treatise
- Notable work: La reina Esther
- Literary movement: Late Renaissance; Baroque

Ansaldo Cebà (1565 – April 1623) was an Italian Baroque poet and literary critic.

== Biography ==
Born to an ancient Genoese family connected with the Grimaldi, Cebà attended the University of Padua, where he studied under Sperone Speroni, and Giason Denores. He specialized in Greek language and literature. On his return to Genoa in 1591 he became a member of the prestigious Accademia degli Addormentati (Academy of the Sleepers), and soon distinguished himself by his academic lectures. He lived most of his life in Genoa. He was ordained a cleric in 1605, after his beloved Geronima Di Negro had become a nun. Cebà was a member of the Accademia degli Incogniti. He died in Genoa in April 1623.

Cebà had an extremely close relationship, by correspondence only, with the jewish poet and writer Sara Copia Sullam, whom he admired but whom he never actually met. He appears to have fallen in love with Sara, and constantly urged her to convert to Christianity, but she resisted. Ansaldo and Sara corresponded from spring 1618 until spring 1622. The correspondence is known through Cebà's Lettere di Ansaldo Cebà scritte a Sarra Copia (Genoa: Giuseppe Pavoni, 1623). Sara's letters to Cebà were never published, and are lost.

== Works ==
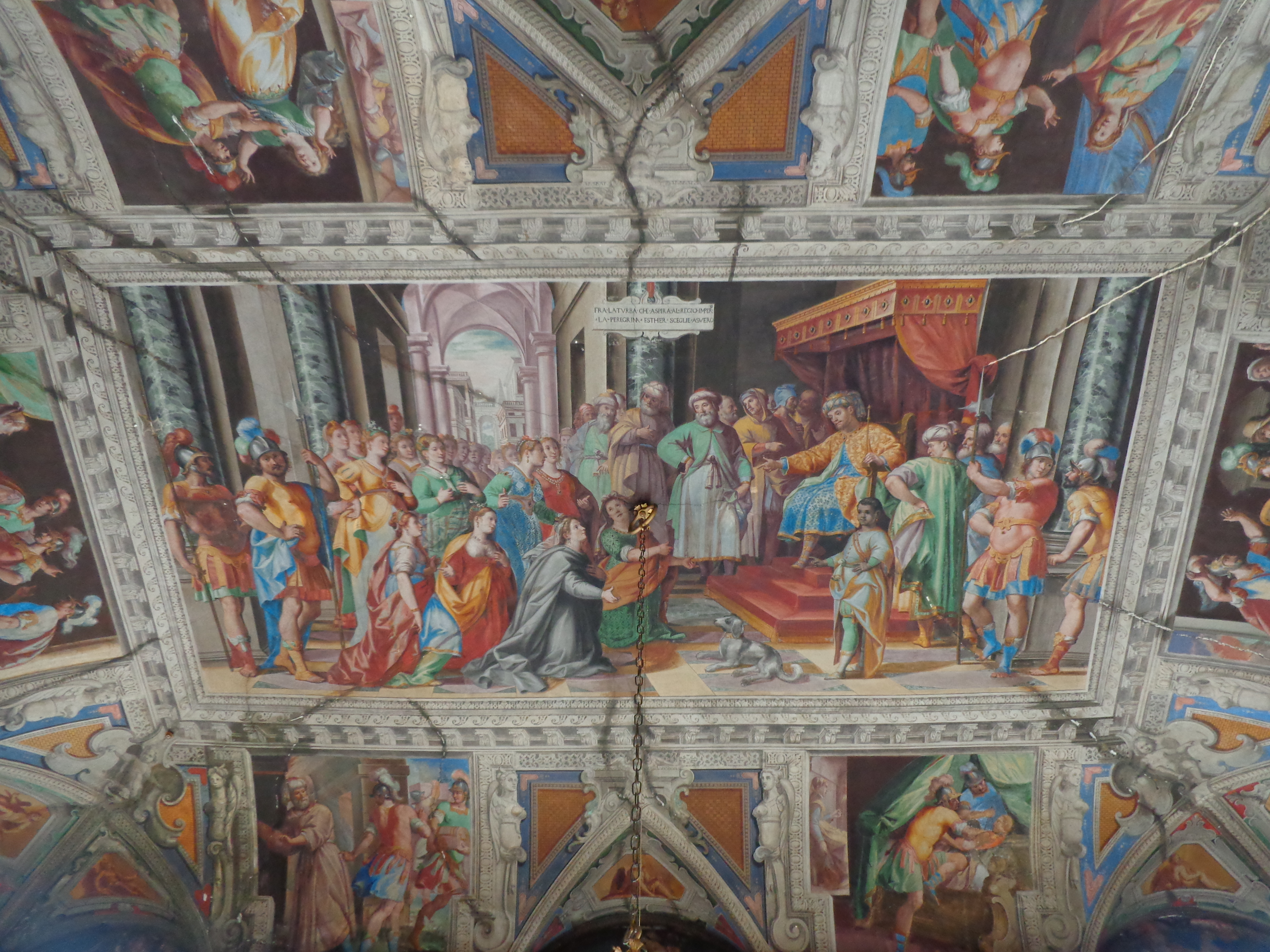
Frescoes by Domenico Fiasella inspired by Cebà's poem, Genoa, Palazzo Giacomo Lomellini

Cebà's conservative intellectual outlook was typical of Genoese lesser nobility, but conflicted with an inclination to Baroque novelty. His first book of verse, Rime, appeared in 1596 at Padua and Antwerp. The love-poetry of a Petrarchan stamp which it contained - celebrating a Genoese lady, Aurelia Spinola - gave way in a second volume of Rime (Rome, 1611) to religious and moral themes. In 1615 he published an epic poem entitled La reina Esther, which narrates Esther's story in twenty-one cantos. The poem was a huge success and established him as an author of note. Sara Copia Sullam addressed an enthusiastic letter full of praise to the Genoese poet. In the letter she admitted that she carried the book with her all the time, and even slept with it. Cebà responded to Sara's letter, and this was the start of four years of letters, gifts and poems, exchanged between the two. The Genoese Doge of the time, Giacomo Lomellini, had his palace frescoed by Domenico Fiasella with a cycle of paintings inspired by Cebà's poem.

In 1617 Cebà published the political treatise Il Cittadino di Repubblica, translated into English by Charles Edwards Lester and published in New York City in 1845. In 1620 he published an Italian version of Theophrastus' Characters, accompanied by a detailed commentary. In 1621 appeared the Esercitii Accademici, and the dialogue Il Gonzaga over del Poema Heroico, in which he tried to prove that Ludovico Ariosto and Torquato Tasso had adhered to the classical unities in their epics. The same year he published also a tragedy, La Principessa Silandra, and the historical treatise Il Principio dell'Historia Romana. A second epic poem, Il Furio Camillo, a second tragedy, Alcippo Spartano, and two volumes of Lettere, came out in 1623, the year of Cebà's death. A third tragedy, Le Gemelle Capovane, was printed for the first time in Scipione Maffei's Teatro Italiano (vol. 2), Verona, 1723.

== Bibliography ==
- Rio, Alexis-François (1856). "Ansaldo Ceba, or, the Martyr of Charity". The Four Martyrs. London: Buns & Lambert: 71–102.
- Giuliani, Nicolò. "Ansaldo Cebà". Giornale Ligustico di Archeologia, Storia e Letteratura. 9 (1882): 386-434; 10 (1883): 3–18, 78–95, 165–84, 401–42; 11 (1884): 3–35, 161–96.
- Bertollotto, G. (1891). "Liguri ellenisti: Ansaldo Cebà" (PDF). Giornale Ligustico di Archeologia, Storia e Letteratura. XVIII: 283–296.
- Hutton, James (1935). The Greek Anthology in Italy to the Year 1800. Ithaca: Cornell University Press. p. 360.
- Sarot, Eden (1954). "Ansaldo Cebà and Sara Copia Sullam". Italica. 31 (3): 138–150. doi:10.2307/476839. JSTOR 476839.
- Boccato, Carla (1974). "Lettere Di Ansaldo Cebà, Genovese, a Sara Copio Sullam, Poetessa Del Ghetto Di Venezia". La Rassegna Mensile di Israel. 40 (4): 169–91. JSTOR 41283987.
- Mutini, Claudio (1979). "CEBÀ, Ansaldo". Dizionario Biografico degli Italiani (in Italian). Vol. 23: Cavallucci–Cerretesi. Rome: Istituto dell'Enciclopedia Italiana. ISBN 978-88-12-00032-6.
- Corradini, Marco (1994). Genova e il barocco. Studi su Angelo Grillo, Ansaldo Cebà, Anton Giulio Brignole Sale. Milan: Vita e pensiero. ISBN 88-343-0452-7.
- Slawinski, M. (2002). "Cebà, Ansaldo". The Oxford Companion to Italian Literature. Oxford University Press.
- Nardone, Jean-Luc (2014). "Per una riedizione critica del Cittadino di republica (1617) di Ansaldo Cebà, accademico Addormentato di Genova". Forme e la storia: Rivista di filologia moderna. VII (1): 131–150. doi:10.1400/232089.
- Grassi, Liliana (2014). "Il Doria, ovvero dell'orazione panegirica di Ansaldo Cebà e l'encomiastica civile genovese". In Danielle Boillet; Liliana Grassi (eds.). Forme e occasioni dell'encomio tra Cinque e Seicento. Lucca: Pacini Fazzi. pp. 83–110. ISBN 978-8865500866.
