= Trifone Gabriel =

Italian humanist

Giorgione: Giovanni Borgherini and His Tutor, 1505-1506. Trifone Gabrielli (right) is shown tutoring a young Borgherini (left)

Trifone Gabriel, Gabriele, Gabrielli or Gabriello (20 November 1470 - 20 October 1549) was an Italian humanist. He appeared not only in the painting Giovanni Borgherini and His Tutor but also in profile on the recto of a bronze medal by Danese Cattaneo (with a woman beside a spring and a quotation from Psalm 23.4 on the reverse). Trifone's contemporaries admired him, holding him to be a model 15th century humanist whose "thousand rare gifts" made him an authoritative example of intellectual and moral life, uncontaminated by the world of early Renaissance courtiers. His "infinite humanity" and "unique kindness" gathered around Gabrielli many intellectuals, mostly from Tuscany and the Veneto, engaged in a renewal of the Italian language which symbolised and embodied the new broom of the Italian Renaissance. Giulio Camillo Delminio dedicated his "Anfiteatro della memoria" to Trifone "and to many other gentlemen". He was also mentioned and praised by several other writers such as Ludovico Ariosto (who included him among his closest friends in the 46th canto of "Orlando Furioso") and Anche Girolamo Muzio (who invoked his aid in his Arte Poetica as a "master of the language"), whilst Bembo and Benedetto Varchi also dedicated sonnets to him.

== Life ==
Pietro Bembo

He was born in San Polo di Piave to the Venetian patricians Bertucci Gabrielli and Diana Pizzamano. His father's family originated in Gubbio and one of its branches had settled in the Venetian Lagoon at an unknown date. Trifone was a contemporary and friend of Pietro Bembo since their teenage years, their friendship lasting right up until Bembo's death in 1547. In his youth he took some administrative roles in the Venetian Republic, but soon resolved to become a clergyman and pursue an ecclesiastical career. His great authority, moral rectitude and cultural interests all meant he was offered prestigious roles such as Bishop of Treviso and Patriarch of Venice, which he always refused, preferring a sober and contemplative life. When offered the Patriarchate by the Venetian Senate he replied "I thank the most illustrious Senate, both those who wanted me and those who did not - the former because they believed I would do good, the latter because they did me good".

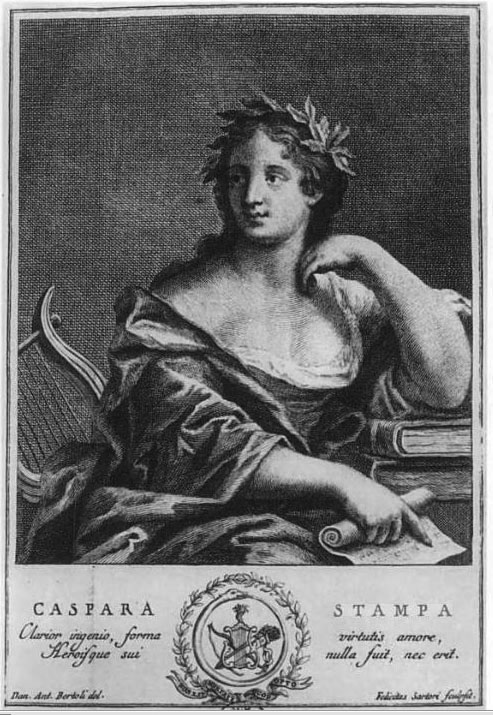
Gaspara Stampa, poet

His wealth allowed him to spend his whole life on rural estates in the areas around Bassano del Grappa and Padua, including the villa dei Ronchi, villa del Tergolino and his garden on Murano, where he hosted a salon for intellectuals and humanists. Surrounded by his friends and students, Trifone read Latin, ancient Greek, Italian and European authors, discussed science and philosophy and invited others to debate and discuss ideas. He was granted special dispensation from the papal curia in 1515 thanks to Bembo allowed him to break his ordination vow not to read "pagan" (i.e. secular) books. Many came to him for advice and teaching, from young students to noted intellectuals and humanists such as Bembo himself, Sperone Speroni, Francesco Sansovino, Monsignor Della Casa, Giovanni Borgherini, Ludovico Ariosto, Bernardo Tasso, Gaspara Stampa, Vittore Soranzo, Benedetto Varchi, Pietro Aretino, Giulio Camillo Delminio, Girolamo Muzio and Gabriel's distant relation Gabriele de' Gabrielli. An excellent philologist and linguist, he was considered one of the "masters of the language" who between the 15th and 16th centuries helped codify the spoken and written Italian language, through rigorous study of major 14th century writers, especially Dante and Petrarch. He was known as "Venice's Socrates" since - like the ancient Greek philosopher of that name - he preferred to impart verbal lessons to his pupils and so left behind no written texts. His lessons compensated for the closure of the University of Padua at the time of the League of Cambrai. A modest man, he did not want to publish anything in his own name and refused all titles except that of Messere. He held riches and honours in contempt and always kept his manners and clothing simple.

He died in Venice on the night of 19–20 October 1549, "more from fasting than from fever" according to Pietro Aretino. He was buried in the city at Santa Maria Celeste. In 1581 Vincenzo Scamozzi was commissioned to produce a tomb monument for Gabriel, admiral Carlo Zen and doge Lorenzo Celsi, all buried in the church. The statue of Trifone was to have been placed on the facade with an inscription Trifone Gabriello nuovo Socrate (Trifone Gabriel, the new Socrates), but the design was not realised and on the church's demolition in 1810 Gabriel's bones were dispersed in the oratory on Sant'Ariano.

== Family ==
Trifone did not marry and had no children. However, his nephew Jacopo (or Giacomo) Gabrielli (1510-1550), his main chronicler, was particularly dear to him. Trifone was also brother to Angelo Gabrielli, who accompanied Pietro Bembo on his journey to Messina (May 1492-July 1494) as a young man. The two young men had gone to Sicily to study Greek with Costantino Lascaris and made a joint trip up Mount Etna. After his return to Venice and then Padua, where Angelo frequently attended the local university, Bembo wrote his first work De Aetna, then published by Aldo Manuzio in February 1496 (1495 according to the Venetian calendar). De Aetna was even dedicated to Angelo Gabrielli (its opening words are "Pietro Bembo, on Etna, to Angelo Gabriel, a book") and his edition was created by Francesco Griffo and used for the first time a tondo showing Bembo.

== Works ==
Trifone's varied interests and refusal to write down his own ideas means it is complex to examine them. They were published by his disciples as dialogues between Trifone and other intellectuals. Philology and linguistics were central and a number of comments on Dante's Divine Comedy are attributed to him, such as "Words said by Trifone Gabriello on Dante's art in his poem", reported in various contemporary and later literary works, and "Annotations made by Monsignor Trifone in Bassano" discovered by Luigi Maria Rezzi in the Biblioteca Barberiniana in 1826. Trifone's nephew Jacopo wrote two linguistic works, Instituzioni della grammatica volgare and Regole grammaticali, both dialogues between the author and Trifone.

Bernardino Partenio's "Dell'imitazione poetica" laid out Trifone's stylistic ideas, this time as a dialogue between Trifone and the humanists Gian Giorgio Trissino and Paolo Manuzio (son of the famous publisher Aldo Manuzio). It investigates the merits and limits of literary imitation, a principle whose authority was gradually diminishing under interrogation from Renaissance authors. Trifone's respect for and knowledge of Petrarch was vast, proving a major influence on Bembo's codification of that poet's work. Bembo famously sent his "Prose nelle quali si ragiona della volgar lingua" to Trifone in 1525 for corrections and editing and mentioned Trifone in various passages of the same work. Bembo and Trifone were also central characters in Bernardino Daniello's "Della poetica", another fundamental work of Petrarchism.

Trifone is also recorded in several codices now at Milan's Biblioteca ambrosiana as commenting on Cicero's De officiis and Scipio's Dream. These comments' attribution is uncertain, but they seem to be various pupils' transcriptions of Trifone's lessons. Trifone also studied science, particularly astronomy, as expounded in his nephew Jacopo's 1545 treatise "Dialogo […] nel quale de la sphera, et de gli orti et occasi de le stelle, minutamente si ragiona" and in "Sferetta", an appendix to Giason Denores's 1582 Tavole del mondo e della sfera. These two treatises merge philosophy, theology, astrology and astronomy, still influenced by esoteric Renaissance thought but also based on scientific observations.

Trifone was also interested in politics, with his thought in that area expounded in Donato Giannotti's 1540 Della repubblica de' Viniziani, an imagined dialogue between Trifone and his favourite disciple Giovanni Borgherini in Bembo's house, expounding the Venetian Republic's superiority over ancient, medieval and Renaissance political models. A number of sonnets by Trifone have also been recorded, including one on Bembo's death.
