= Palazzo Giacomo Lomellini =

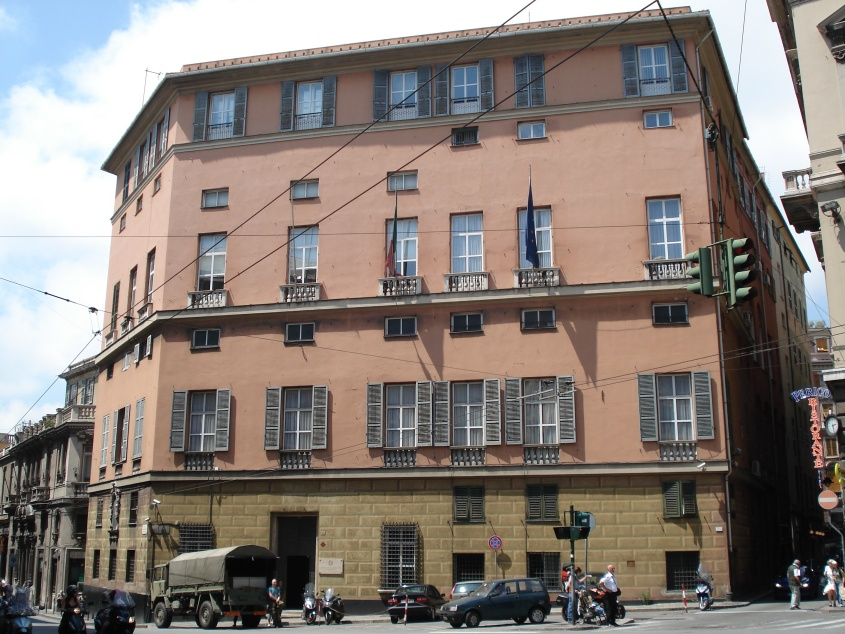
- Facade of the Palazzo Giacomo Lomellini in square Largo Zecca 2
- Interactive map of the Palazzo Giacomo Lomellini area
- Alternative names: Palazzo Patrone

General information
- Status: In use
- Type: Palace
- Architectural style: Mannerist
- Location: Genoa, Italy, 2, square Largo Zecca
- Coordinates: 44.41356°N 8.92966°E
- Construction started: 1619
- Completed: 1623

UNESCO World Heritage Site
- Part of: Genoa: Le Strade Nuove and the system of the Palazzi dei Rolli
- Criteria: Cultural: (ii)(iv)
- Reference: 1211
- Inscription: 2006 (30th Session)

The Palazzo Giacomo Lomellini, also known as the Palazzo Patrone, is a building in Largo Zecca at number 2 in Genoa, included on 13 July 2006 in the list of the 42 palaces inscribed in the Rolli di Genova that became World Heritage by UNESCO on that date.

The building, together with the adjacent Palazzo De Marini-Spinola, has been the headquarters of the Italian Army Military Command in Liguria since 1945.

== History ==
Attached to the adjoining palazzo De Marini-Spinola of the priory of Sant’Agnese, the building was rebuilt by Giacomo Lomellini (Doge of Genoa from 1625 to 1627), uniting two building units of the ancestral heritage, including the aristocratic residence included in the first rolli of public hospitality.

Erected between 1619 and 1623, in an area characterised by strong residential expansion, the mansion expresses a traditional language of ostentatious pursuit of symmetry in plan and elevation. Despite the narrowness of the space due to the building behind, the palace is not without a certain scenographic taste, proposing, with its courtyard in the shape of a triforium, the courtly solution of a 'royal entrance' culminating against the back wall in a small nymphaeum that has disappeared today, but is partly visible in the rubensiana.

Around 1855, it was sold by the Lomellini family to the Patrone family, who owned it until 1897, when the building was ceded by its last owner, Fausto Patrone, to the Genoa City Council, which, in order to widen the street section between Largo della Zecca and Piazza della Nunziata, demolished one of its corners, eliminating a sitting room and an adjoining lavatory on each floor. The plugging of the courtyard loggia, with the insertion of two columns similar to those already existing and the creation of new vaulting (architecture) in 1923, was the choice of Antonio Orazio Quinzio, then director of the municipal museums, who also carried out the grotesque decoration of the reception staircase.

Initially used as the seat of municipal offices, in 1928 the headquarters of the Genoese Fascio were established there, while since 1945 Palazzo Lomellini has been the headquarters of the Military Command of the Italian Army in Liguria.

== Description ==
An admired cycle of frescoes by Domenico Fiasella illustrating Stories of Ester can be seen inside the church: the importance of expressive quality is flanked by that of a profound political allusion that the commissioner intended to manifest by choosing it among biblical themes. The cycle of frescoes is developed in various rooms, in the atrium vault «The Fall of Jerusalem», in that of the first piano nobile «The Banquet of Ahasuerus» and in that of the second piano nobile «The Choice of Esther by Ahasuerus». It was directly inspired by Ansaldo Cebà's contemporary literary work La Reina Esther. Indeed, the biblical heroine Esther, who risks her life to save her people, alludes to the feat of Doge Giacomo Lomellini, who at the head of the Republic had to face numerous adversities such as the De Marini conspiracy, the conspiracy of Giulio Cesare Vachero and the siege of Carlo Emanuele I of Savoy, who was defeated despite the odd number of forces in the field.

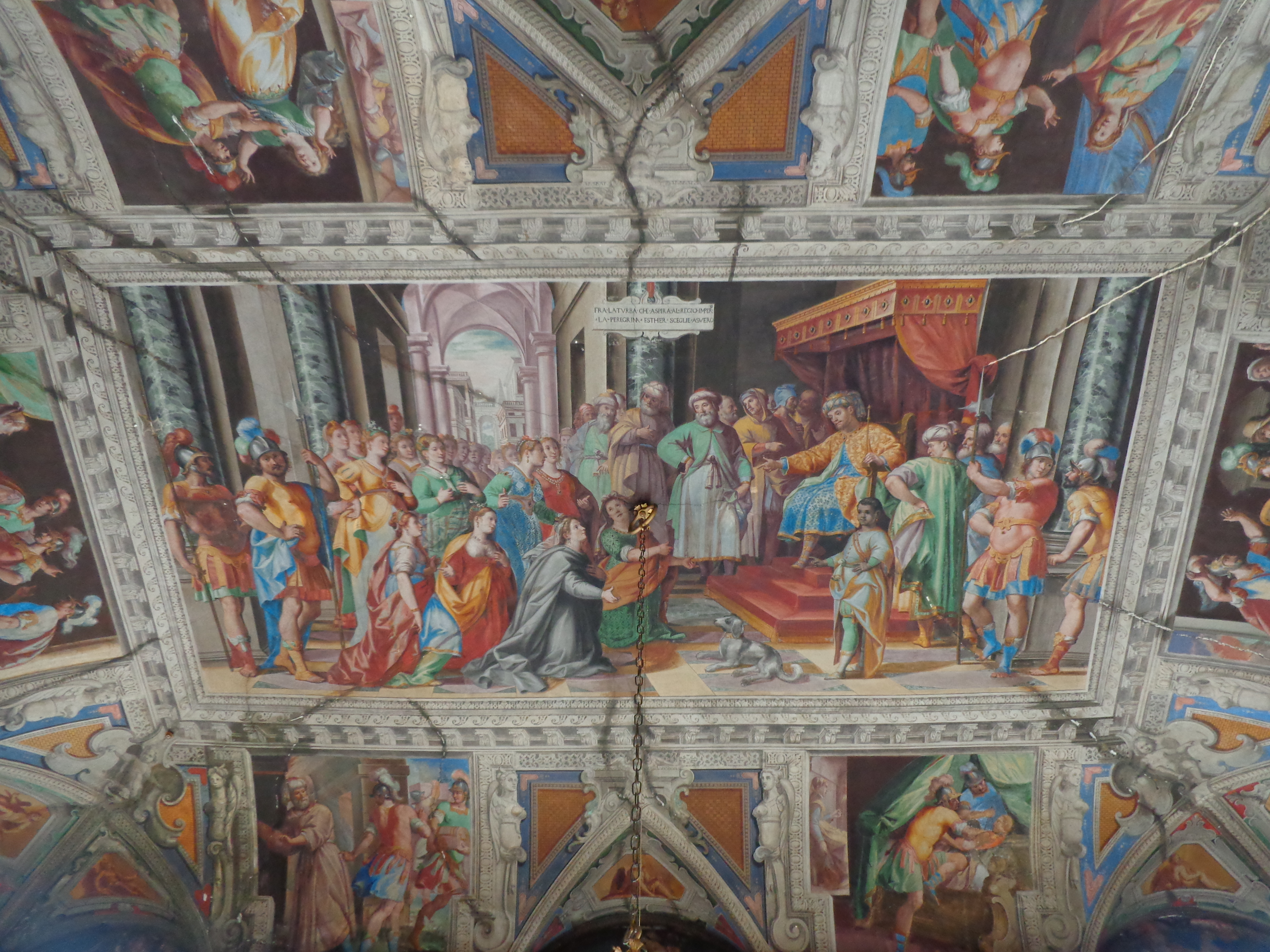
Domenico Fiasella, The Choice of Esther by Ahasuerus

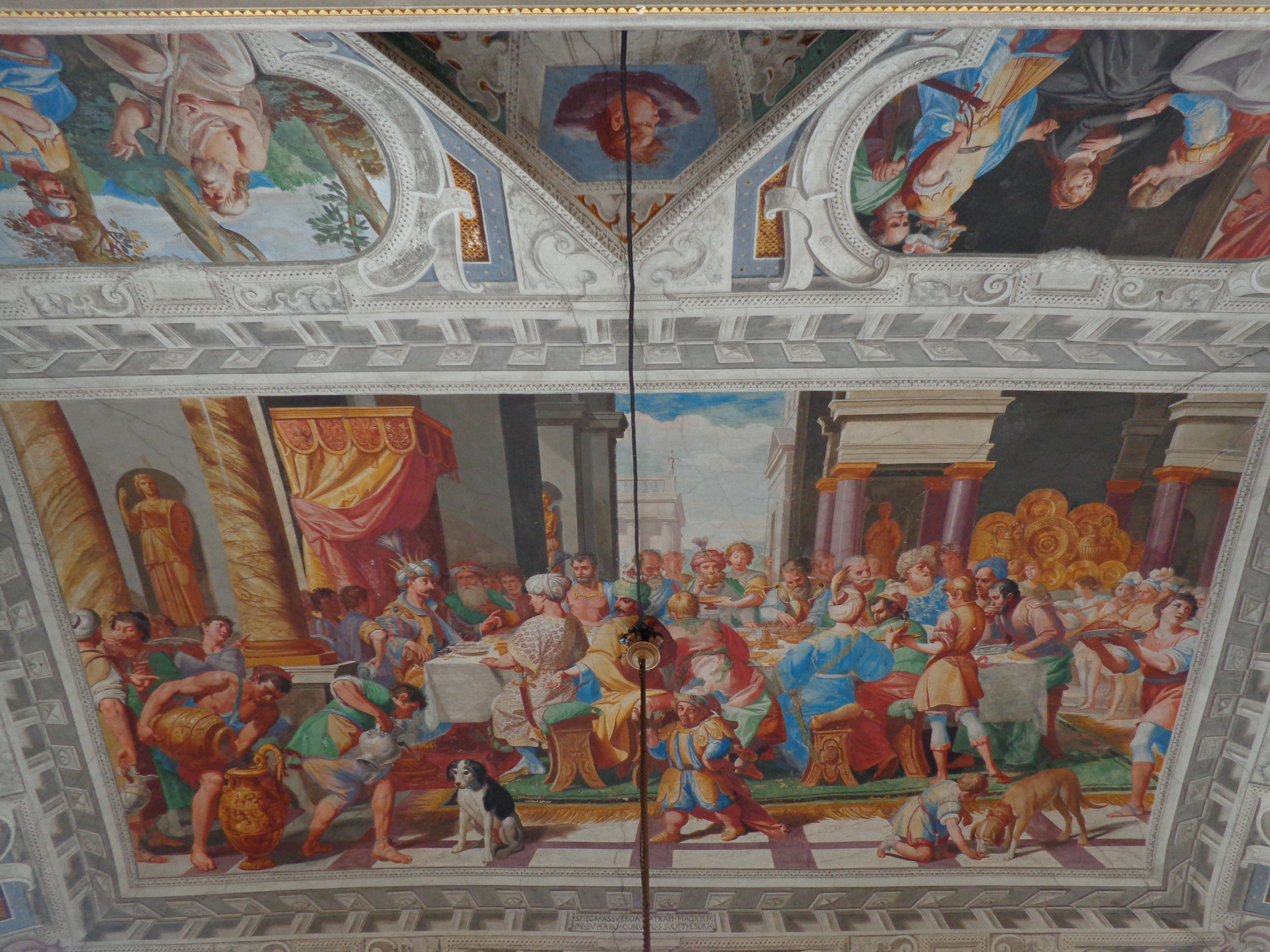
The Banquet of Ahasuerus.

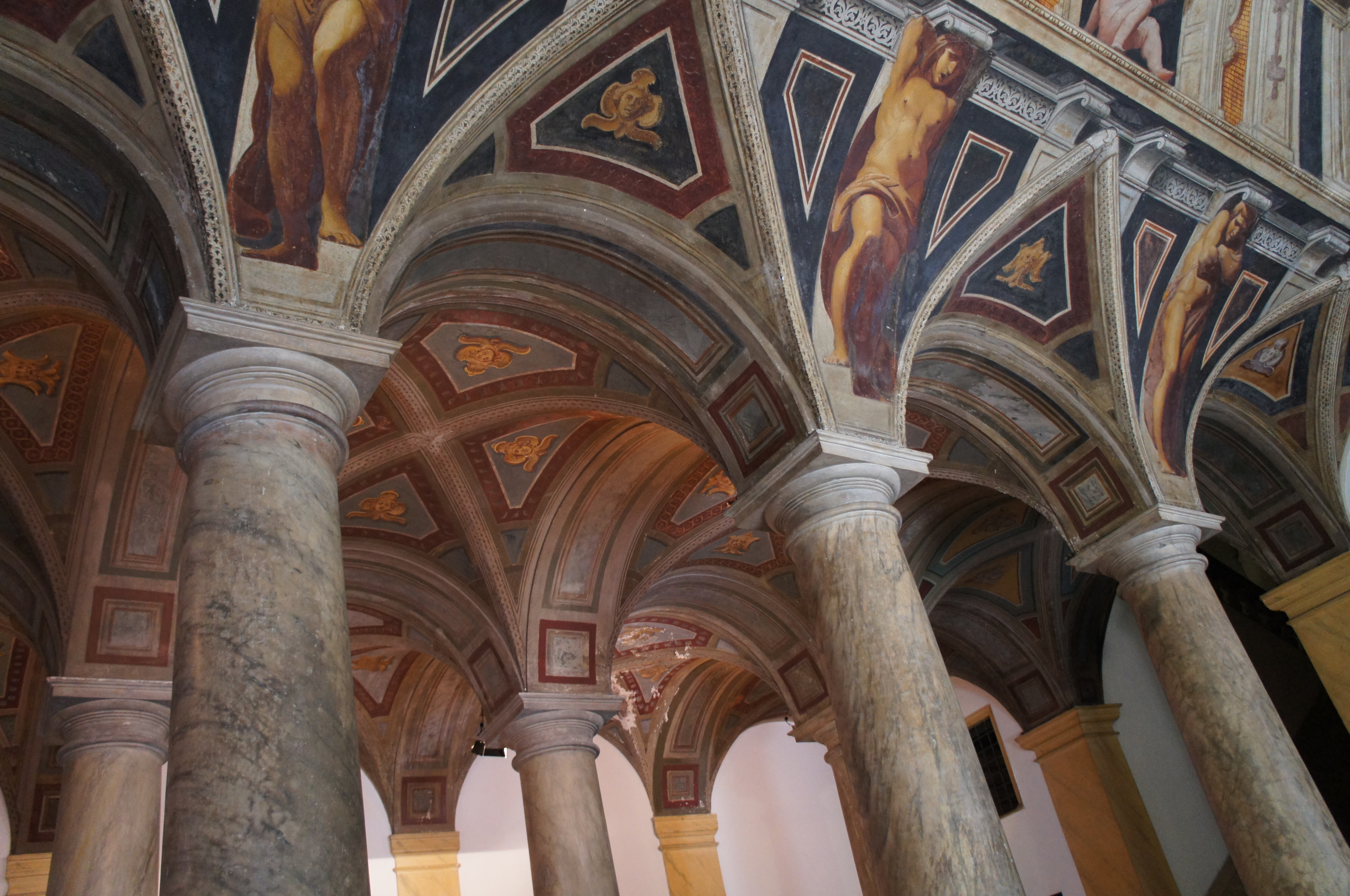
The Inner Courtyard

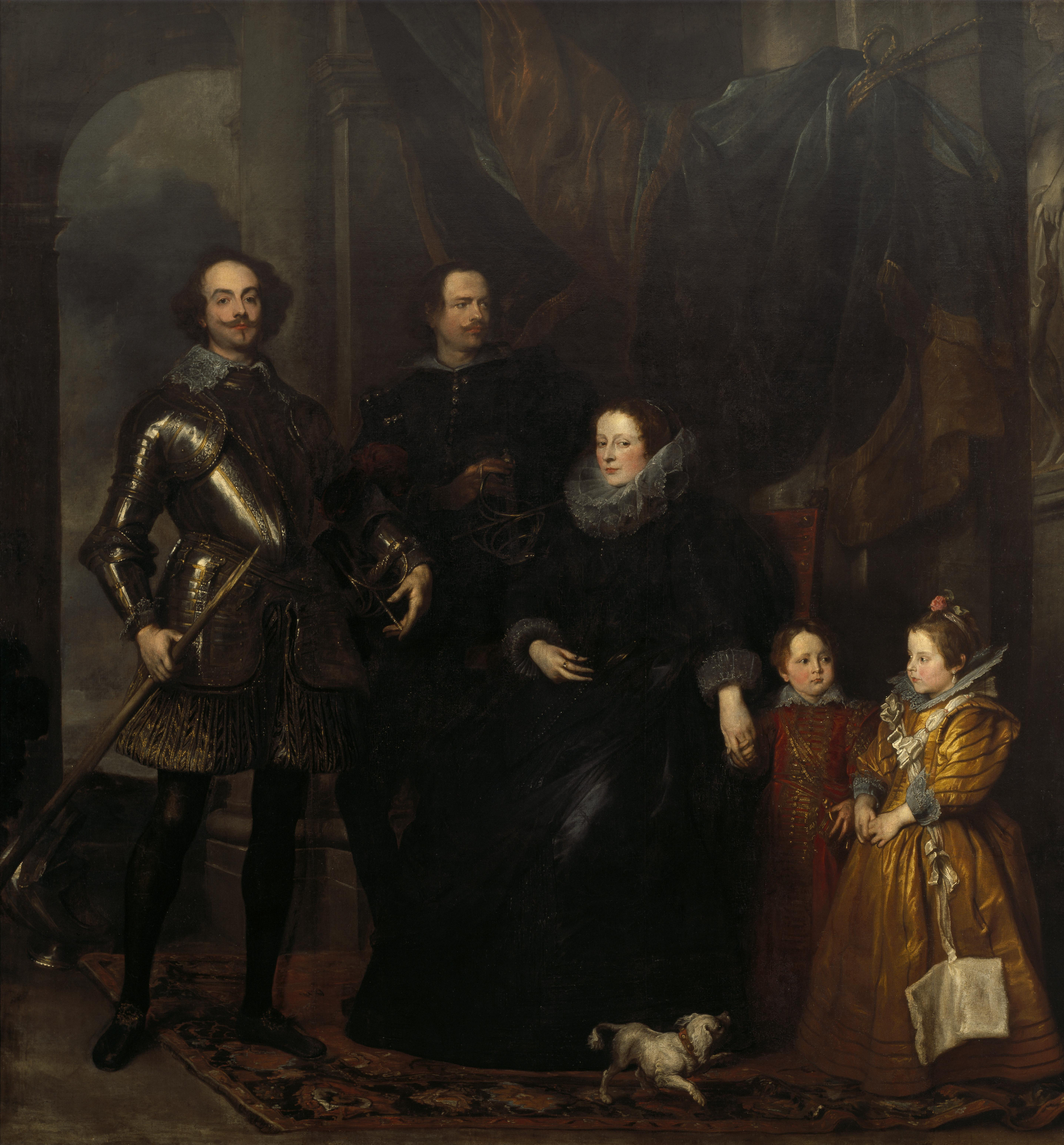
Anthony van Dyck, Portrait of the Lomellini Family, 1623, National Gallery of Scotland

.

== Bibliography ==
=== Italian sources ===
- Mario Labò, "I Palazzi di Genova di P.P.Rubens e altri scritti d’architettura", Genova, Nuova Editrice genovese, 2003.
- Ennio Poleggi, "I Palazzi di Genova. Palazzo Lomellini-Patrone", Genova, Tormena, 1995.
- Ennio Poleggi, "Una reggia repubblicana. Atlante dei Palazzi di Genova 1576/1664", Torino, Umberto Alemandi, 1998.
