= Giason Denores =

Italian Renaissance philosopher

Giasone De Nores
- Born: c. 1530; Nicosia, Republic of Venice
- Died: 1590; Padua, Republic of Venice
- Occupations: Philosopher; University teacher; Renaissance humanist
- Spouse: Aikaterini Sygklitikou
- Children: 3
- Parent: Pietro De Nores

Academic background
- Education: University of Padua
- Influences: Trifone Gabriel; Sperone Speroni

Academic work
- Era: Renaissance, Counter-Reformation
- Discipline: Literary theory, Philosophy of language
- Institutions: University of Padua
- Notable students: Ansaldo Cebà
- Influenced: Jacques Pelletier du Mans

Giasone Denores or De Nores (c. 1530 – 1590) was an Italian philosopher of the Renaissance.

== Biography ==
Giasone De Nores was born around 1530 at Nicosia, in the island of Cyprus. His family, which hailed originally from Normandy, was one of the most powerful in the island. His grandmother was the sister of the powerful Cardinal Prodocator. Of her sons, one, Pietro De Nores, was apparently Giason's father, while another, Giovan De Nores, had a distinguished career as a lawyer and diplomat. Giasone was married to Aikaterini Sygklitikou, and they had three children, Pietro (born in Cyprus before 1571), Laura and Lucretia.

In the late 1540s De Nores was sent to study at the University of Padua. In this centre of Aristotelian philosophy - Padua was the one city which had adhered loyally to Aristotelianism even when it had fallen into disrepute during the Renaissance - he studied letters and the sciences under the direction of the famous humanist Trifone Gabriel. A close intimacy sprang up between professor and student. Towards the end of his life, De Nores recalled with pride that Gabriel, 'in spite of the fact that he could have followed princes and cardinals,' had not scorned to dwell for many months in his student's house. The second person under whose influence De Nores came was Sperone Speroni, professor of Logic and Philosophy in the University of Padua and leader of the Accademia degli Infiammati.

After receiving his doctorate, De Nores returned to Cyprus. It was shortly after this, in 1553, that, hearing of the death of Trifone Gabriel, he issued his first work - a commentary on Horace's Ars Poetica based on Trifone Gabriel's talks on the subject.

In 1570, Cyprus, which had been under the sway of Venice since 1489, was subdued and conquered by Selim II. Nicosia, and the city capitulated after resisting for 44 days. Twenty thousand of the inhabitants were slaughtered by the invaders. De Nores found asylum in Venice, where he became a member of the Accademia dei Pellegrini. For some years he worked as tutor in the palaces of various noble Venetian families.

In December 1573, the academy of the 'Rinascenti' was inaugurated in Padua, and De Nores was appointed reader in Rhetoric, with the annual emolument of 50 ducats.

In 1577 his fellow-refugees chose him to plead their cause before the new Doge Sebastiano Venier. The oration that he delivered on this occasion - afterwards inserted in his Rhetorica - had a double effect. To the Cyprians was conceded the right to inhabit with many privileges the city of Pula; and to De Nores was offered the Chair of Moral Philosophy at Padua. This professorship, which had not been filled since the death of Francesco Robortello ten years earlier, carried with it an annual stipend of 200 florins, increased to 300 in 1589.

Relieved from financial worries, De Nores could devote himself to his philosophical and literary pursuits: in the remaining thirteen years of his life he wrote eleven of his fourteen works. His Discorso (1587) and Poetica (1588) by their adverse criticism of pastoral tragicomedy involved him in a bitter polemic with Giovanni Battista Guarini, the author of Il pastor fido. In the midst of the controversy De Nores died, in 1590, at the age of about 60 years.

== Works ==
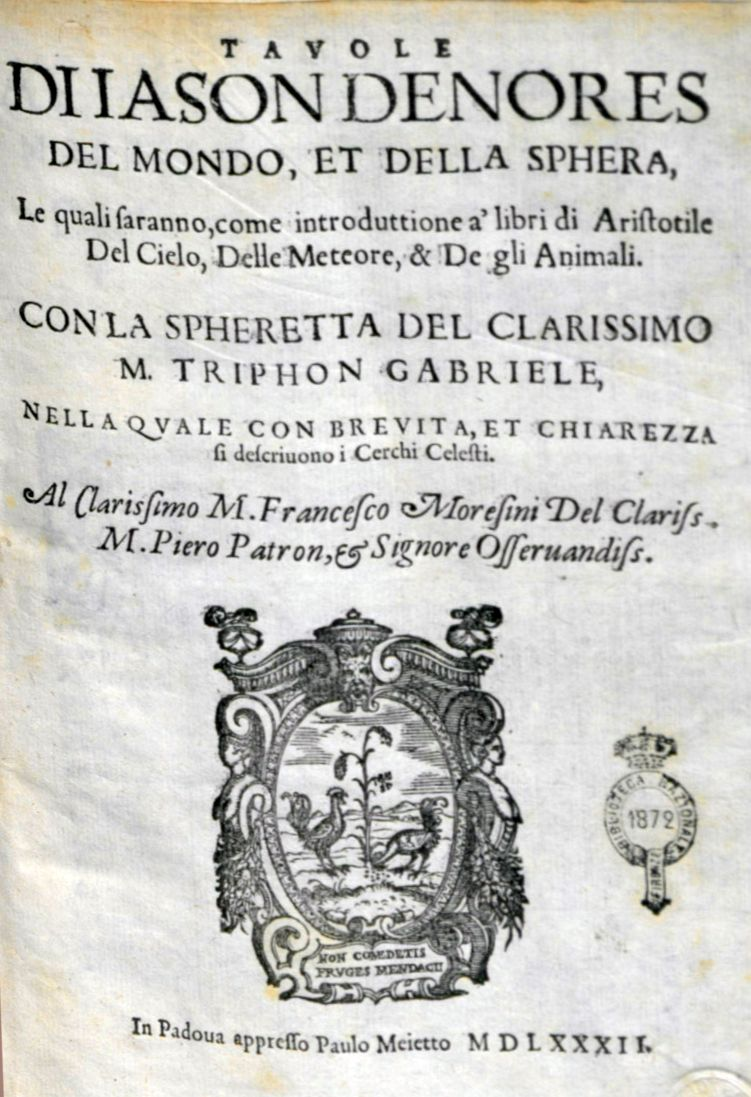
Tavole del mondo et della sphera, 1582

- In Epistolam Q. Horatij Flacci de arte poetica Iasonis de Nores Ciprij ex quotidianis Tryphonis Cabrielij sermonibus interpretatio. Eiusdem Breuis, et distincta summa praeceptorum de arte dicendi ex tribus Ciceronis libris de oratore collecta. Venetiis: apud Aldi Filios. 1553.
- Breve trattato del mondo, et delle sue parti, semplici, et miste, con molte altre considerationi, che di grado in grado saranno più notabili, & più degne di cognitione, di Jason Denores ... In Venetia: appresso Andrea Muschio. 1571.
- Breve trattato dell'oratore di m. Iason Denores alla studiosa, et valorosa giouentù de' Nobili della illustrissima Republica Vinitiana. Discorso del medesimo intorno alla distintione, deffinitione, & divisione della rhetorica in più tavole poi a maggior facilità ordinatamente compartito ... In Padova: appresso Simon Galignani. 1574.
- Breve institutione dell'ottima republica di Iason Denores, raccolta in gran parte da tutta la Philosophia humana di Aristotile, quasi come una certa introduttione dell'Ethica, Politica, & Economica ... Introdutione del medesimo ridotta poi in alcune tavole sopra i tre libri della Rhetorica d'Aristotile ... In Venetia: appresso Paolo Megietti. 1578.
- Oratione di Iason Denores al sereniss. principe di Venetia Sebastian Veniero, per nome di quei gentil'huomini del Regno di Cipro, che dopo la perdita della patria si trovarono presenti nel tempo della sua feliciss. creatione: Ove da parte di tutti brevemente si rallegra con Sua Serenità, dimostra la loro fedeltà, & devotione verso la sua Republica ... & finalmente dimanda qualche aiuto per sovvenimento delle loro calamità. In Padova: [Paolo Meietti], per Lorenzo Pasquati. 1578.
- In M. Tullij Ciceronis universam philosophiam de vita, et moribus, ad illustrissimos, & sapientissimos Patavinæ academiæ moderatores, ... Iasonis Denores brevis, & distincta institutio. Patavij: apud Paulum Meietum. 1581.
- Tavole di Iason Denores del mondo, et della sphera, le quali saranno, come introduttione a' libri di Aristotile del cielo, delle meteore, & de gli animali. Con la spheretta del clarissimo m. Triphon Gabriele, nella quale con brevità, et chiarezza si descrivono i cerchi celesti... In Padova: appresso Paulo Meietto, 1582. 1582.
- De constitutione partium universae humanae, et civilis philosophiae, quam Aristoteles sapienter conscripsit, ... Iasonis Denores praefatio, in Gymnasio Patavino publice habita. Patavii: apud Paulum Meietum. 1584.
- Della rhetorica di Giason Denores libri tre, ne' quali, oltra i precetti dell'arte, si contengono vinti orationi tradotte de' più famosi, & illustri philosophi, & oratori: con gli argomenti loro, discorsi, tavole, & ruote, ... In Venetia: appresso Paolo Megietto, libraro in Padoa. 1584.
- Discorso di Iason Denores intorno a' que' principii, cause, et accrescimenti, che la comedia, la tragedia, et il poema heroico ricevono dalla philosophia morale, & ciuile, & da' governatori delle Republiche. All'illustrissimo, et molto reverendo signor abbate, Galeazzo Riario. In Padova: appresso Paulo Meieto. 1587.
- Poetica di Iason Denores nella qual per via di definitione, & divisione si tratta secondo l'opinion d'Arist. della tragedia, del poema heroico, & della comedia... In Padova: appresso Paulo Meietto. 1588.
- Discorso di Iason Denores intorno alla geographia. In Padova: appresso Paolo Meietti. 1589.
- Sphera di Iason Denores raccolta da nobilissimi scrittori, & con novo ordine sommamente facilitata ... Discorso del medesimo intorno alla geographia. In Padova: appresso Paolo Meietti. 1589.
- Apologia contra l'auttor del Verato di Iason de Nores di quanto ha egli detto in un suo discorso delle tragicomedie, & delle pastorali ... In Padova: appresso Paolo Meietti. 1590.
- Panegirico di Iason de Nores in laude della Sereniss. Rep. di Venetia al clarissimo sig. Benedetto Georgio, dell'illustrissimo signor Alvise, patron, & protettor sempre oss.mo. In Padova: appresso Paolo Meietti. 1590.

== Bibliography ==
- Budd, F. E. (1927). "A Minor Italian Critic of the Sixteenth Century: Jason Denores". The Modern Language Review. 22 (4): 421–434. doi:10.2307/3714849. JSTOR 3714849.
- Patrizi, Giorgio (1990). "DENORES, Giason". Dizionario Biografico degli Italiani (in Italian). Vol. 38: Della Volpe–Denza. Rome: Istituto dell'Enciclopedia Italiana. ISBN 978-88-12-00032-6.
- Gibbons, D. (2002). "De Nores, Giasone". The Oxford Companion to Italian Literature. Oxford University Press. ISBN 978-0-19-818332-7.
- Jourde, Michel; Monferran, Jean-Charles (2004). "Jacques Peletier, lecteur de Giason Denores: une source ignorée de l'Art poétique". Bibliothèque d'Humanisme et Renaissance. 66 (1): 119–32. JSTOR 20680700.
- Lampaki, Eleni (2022). "Denores, Giason". In Marco Sgarbi (ed.). Encyclopedia of Renaissance Philosophy. Springer Nature. pp. 1004–1007. ISBN 9783319141695.
