= Alexis-François Rio =

French art historian

Alexis-François Rio (20 May 1797 – 17 June 1874) was a French writer on art. Without any strict method or criticism, he expressed preference for the art of the 15th century. He contributed greatly towards recovery of the neglected art of the Middle Ages.

== Life ==
Rio was born in Port-Louis, Morbihan, Bretagne. He was educated at the college of Vannes, where he received his first appointment as instructor, which occupation however proved to be distasteful. He proceeded to Paris, but was temporarily disappointed in his hope of obtaining there a chair of history.

His enthusiastic championship of the liberty of the Greeks attracted the attention of the Government, which appointed him censor of the public press. His refusal of this appointment won him great popularity and the lifelong friendship of Charles Forbes René de Montalembert. In 1828, he published his first work, "Essai sur l'histoire de l'esprit humain dans l'antiquité", which brought him the favour of the minister Auguste de La Ferronays and a secretariate in the Ministry of Foreign Affairs. This position allowed him (as Montalembert later wrote to him) to become for Christian, what Winckelmann had been for ancient, art.

He spent the greater portion of the period 1830–60 in travels through Italy, Germany, and England. In Munich he became acquainted with the spokesmen of contemporary Catholicism -- Sulpiz Boisserée, Franz Xaver Baader, Ignaz von Döllinger, Joseph Görres, and Karl Friedrich von Rumohr -- and also with Friedrich Schelling. Schelling gave him an insight into the aesthetic ideal; Rumohr directed him to Italy, where the realization of this ideal in art could be seen.

After contact with the Pre-Raphaelites of England, where he lived for three years and married, and especially of Montalembert's encouragement, he visited again, in company with his wife, all the important galleries of Europe, although he had meanwhile become lame and had to drag himself through the museums on crutches.

== Works ==
In 1835 the first volume of his Art chrétien appeared under the misleading title, De la poésie chrétienne - Forme de l'art. This work, which was received with enthusiasm in Germany and Italy, was a complete failure in France. Discouraged, he renounced art study and wrote a history of the persecutions of the English Catholics, a work which was never printed.

Prominent men like Gladstone, Manzoni, and Thiers became interested in his studies, which he published in four volumes under the title "L'art chrétien" (1861-7). This work is not a history of all Christian art, but of Italian painting from Cimabue to the death of Raphael.

Rio describes the more notable incidents of his life in the two works, Histoire d'un collège Breton sous l'Empire, la petite chouannerie (1842) and Epilogue à l'art chrétien (2 vols., 1872). He also published the following works: Shakespeare (1864), in which he claims the dramatist as a Catholic; Michel-Ange et Raphael (1867); L'idéal antique et l'idéal chrétien (1873).
