= Antonio Foler =

Italian painter

Antonio Foler (1536-1616) was an Italian painter active mainly in Venice, painting sacred subjects in a late-Renaissance or Mannerist style. Follero, Egie

== Biography ==
He painted a San Stefano for the church of Santo Stefano, Venice. He lived his life impoverished.

He is also known as Antonio de Ferrari or Ferrari or Follero of Del Foler. He was a member of the guild of painters in Venice from 1590 to 1612. He was likely born in Venice. he also painted a Birth of the Virgin (1589) for the church of San Barnaba, Venice. He also painted for the church of Santa Caterina, Venice. Many of his works have been lost or destroyed.
