= Giovanni Borgherini and His Tutor =

Painting attributed to Giorgione

Giovanni Borgherini and His Tutor is a c. 1505 oil on canvas painting attributed to Giorgione and now in Washington's National Gallery of Art.

It may be the work Giorgio Vasari saw in Giovanni Borgherini's home in Florence, which he recorded as produced by Giorgione in Venice during Borgherini's youth. A 1568 edition of Vasari's Lives of the Artists states "In Florence by his [Giorgione's] hand in the house of Giovan Borgherini's sons [is] the portrait of the same Giovanni, when he was young in Venice, and in the same painting his tutor guiding him; one can see in both heads finer tints of shadow than in any other work". It was probably commissioned by Giovanni's father Salvi Borgherini, who was in Venice with his son from 1504 onwards.

The work may have been left to Giovanni's heirs and successors until the knight Pier-Francesco Borgherini moved it into his collection in Milan. In 1923 it was sold to Sir Herbert Cook to hang at Doughty House in Richmond, Surrey. It was sold from the Cook Collection by 1960 and on the latter occasion was acquired by the American Michael Straight to hang at his home in Alexandria, Virginia. In 1974 he donated it to its present home.

There are some doubts over the attribution, as the painting has no recorded history before the 20th century and some scholars believe another work in the Alte Pinakothek may be the original seen by Vasari.
