= Baldassarre Bonifacio =

Italian bishop and scholar (1585–1659)

- Bishop of Koper
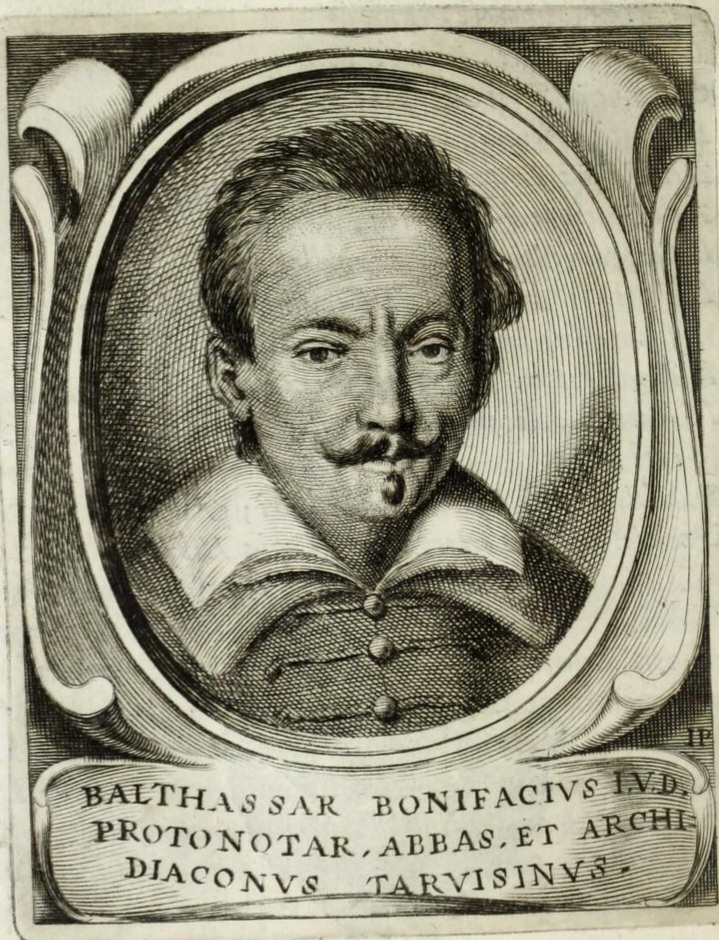
- Portrait of Baldassarre Bonifacio from the book "Le glorie degli Incogniti", 1647
- Church: Catholic Church
- Diocese: Diocese of Koper
- Appointed: 23 November 1653
- Term ended: 17 November 1659
- Predecessor: Pietro Morari
- Successor: Francesco Zeno

Orders
- Consecration: 30 November 1653 (Bishop) by Marcantonio Bragadin

Personal details
- Born: 5 February 1585 Crema, Republic of Venice
- Died: 17 November 1659 (aged 74) Capodistria, Republic of Venice
- Buried: Assumption Cathedral, Koper
- Parents: Bonifacio Bonifacio and Paola Bonifacio (née Corniani)
- Education: University of Padua

Baldassarre Bonifacio (5 January 1585 – 17 November 1659) was an Italian Catholic bishop, theologian, scholar, and historian, known for his work De archivis liber singularis (1632), the first known treatise on the management of archives.

== Biography ==
Baldassare Bonifacio was born at Crema, in the Republic of Venice, on January 5, 1586, the son of Bonifacio Bonifacio, celebrated jurist and assessor, and of Paola Corniani, the daughter of Giovanni Francesco Corniani, likewise jurist and assessor. He studied humanities at Rovigo under the supervision of Antonio Riccoboni and graduated in law at the University of Padua at the age of eighteen. About two years later, he was appointed professor of law at the college of Rovigo, where he lectured on the Institutes of Justinian.

Sometime within the next five years, Bonifacio accompanied Count Girolamo di Porzia, bishop of Adria and papal nuncio, to Germany as a private secretary. Upon his return to the Republic of Venice, he was made archpriest of Rovigo. In 1619, Bonifacio was nominated as professor of classics at the University of Padua but turned down the position.

In the next year, the Venetian Senate offered him the position of professor of civil law at the Academy of Nobles in Venice. At the time of his acceptance, he was in Rome. Before his return Pope Urban VIII, upon the recommendation of the Venetian Senate, named him to the bishopric of Hierapetra and Sitia on the Greek island of Crete. Bonifacio declined the post for health and safety concerns. As partial compensation, the pope appointed him archdeacon of Treviso, in which office he served four successive bishops (Francesco Giustiniani, Vincenzo Giustiniani, Silvestro Morosini, and Marco Morosini).

In 1636, the Republic of Venice created a new college for the sons of the nobility at Padua. By public decree, it named Bonifacio dean, at a generous stipend, of the new institution which was formally opened in 1637. He directed the college for only a short time, after which he was succeeded by the Milanese scholar Francesco Bernardino Ferrari. Shortly afterwards, he founded the Accademia dei Solleciti in Treviso.

In 1653, he was appointed bishop of Koper, a position he held until his death. He died on 17 November 1659, aged 75, and was buried in his cathedral church, close by the altar of the Epiphany (which he had privately contributed). Bonifacio was an erudite and prolific author (scribacissimus homo, according to Morhof, Polyhistor, 1732, p. 1070). He is best known by his Historia Ludicra, a collection of miscellaneous notes on a vast variety of subjects originally published in Venice in 1652. The first edition of the work had no index or table, and its contents were consequently almost inaccessible. Jean Mommart supplied this want in his edition of 1656, to which he has prefixed a full table and added a copious index. Bonifacio also published a collection of Latin poems (1619) and an essay on ancient Roman historiography, De Romanæ Historiae Scriptoribus excerpta ex Bodino Vossio et aliis, Venice, 1627. A list of his works is given at the end of the second edition of the Historia Ludrica (Bruxelles, 1656).

Throughout his life, Bonifacio maintained friendly relationships with numerous intellectuals of his day and was a member of several academies (Umoristi, Incogniti, Olimpici, Filarmonici). He was a close friend of the learned Augustinian monk Angelico Aprosio. Bonifacio was a regular attendee of Sara Copia Sullam's literary salon. Despite having been her friend and protector, in 1621 Bonifacio published the philosophical pamphlet Dell'Immortalità dell'anima, a frontal attack on Sara, whom he repeatedly accused of denying the immortality of the soul. Sara answered this attack with a Manifesto published the same year, in which she defended herself from Bonifacio's accusation.

== Works ==
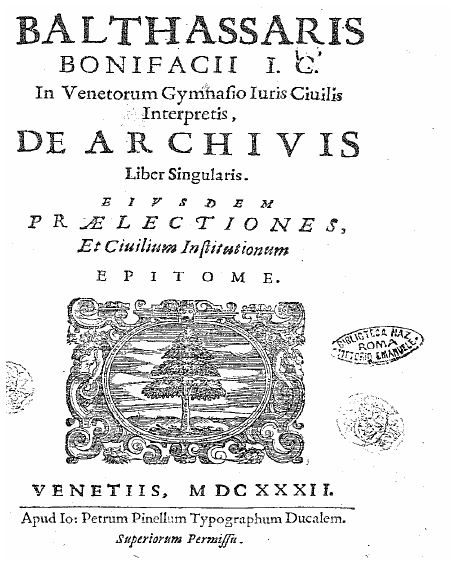
Title page of De Archiviis by Baldassarre Bonifacio, 1632

- Castore e Polluce. Rime di Baldassarre Bonifaccio, e di Gio. Maria Vanti. Venice: appresso Francesco Prati. 1618.
- Balthassaris Bonifacii Stichidion libri XVIII. Venice: apud Pratum. 1619.
- Balthassaris Bonifacij Musarum pars prima. Venice: apud Ioannem Iacobum Hertium. 1646.
- Dell'immortalità dell'anima, discorso di Baldassare Bonifaccio. Venice: appresso Antonio Pinelli. 1621.
- Risposta al manifesto della Signora Sarra Copia. Venice: appresso Antonio Pinelli. 1621.
- Amata: tragedia di Baldassare Bonifaccio. Venice: appresso Antonio Pinelli. 1622. Giovanni Mario Crescimbeni, in his Istoria della volgar poesia (1698), praises this tragedy as one of the best of its day.
- Caroli Sigonii Iudicium de historicis, qui res romanas scripserunt, ab Vrbe condita ad Caroli Magni imperatoris tempora. Accesserunt de eisdem scriptoribus Excerpta a Balthassare Bonifacio, et Ordo Romanæ historiæ legendæ Adriani Politi, Venice, apud Antonium Pinellum, 1627, 4º; Helmstadt, 1674, 4º;
- Historia ludicra. Opus ex omni disciplinarum genere, selecta et Jucunda eruditione refertum, Venice, apud Paulum Baleonium, 1652, 4º; Bruxelles, Joan. Mommartius, 1656;
- De Archivis liber singularis. Ejusdem Praelectiones et Civilium Institutionum Epitome. Venice: apud J.P. Pinellium. 1632.
- Balthassaris Bonifacii Conjecturæ in Martialem. Ejusdem Polynesi origines. Venice: ex typographia Pinelliana. 1635.
- Epistolae duae de majoribus Venetorum comitiis et judiciis capitalibus, altera ad Jo. Franciscum Corneanium altera ad Dominicum Molinum. Published by Pieter Burman in the fifth volume of his Thesaurus Antiquitatum et Historiarum Italiae, Lugduni Batavorum, 1722 (pp. 63–66).

== Bibliography ==
- Nicéron, Jean-Pierre (1731). "Bonifacio (Balthazar)". Memoires pour servir a l'histoire des hommes illustres dans la republique des lettres (in French). Vol. 16. Paris: Briasson. pp. 366–378.
- Chalmers, Alexander (1812). "Bonifacio, Balthasar". General Biographical Dictionary. Vol. 6. London: J. Nichols. pp. 56–57.
- Michaud, Joseph François; Michaud, Louis Gabriel (1812). "Bonifacio (Balthazar)". Biographie universelle, ancienne et moderne (in French). Vol. 5. Paris: Michaud frères. pp. 117–120.
- Born, Lester K. (1941). "Baldassare Bonifacio and his Essay de Archivis". The American Archivist. 4 (4): 221–237. JSTOR 40288263.
- Rossi, Lovanio (1970). "BONIFACIO, Baldassarre". Dizionario Biografico degli Italiani (in Italian). Vol. 12: Bonfadini–Borrello. Rome: Istituto dell'Enciclopedia Italiana. pp. 192–193. ISBN 978-88-12-00032-6.
- Bonfiglio Dosio, Giorgetta (2019). "Baldassarre Bonifacio". In Luciana Duranti; Patricia C. Franks (eds.). Encyclopedia of Archival Writers, 1515-2015. Rowman & Littlefield. pp. 58–60. ISBN 9781538125809.

Catholic Church titles
Preceded by Pietro Morari	Bishop of Koper; 1653–1659	Succeeded by Francesco Zeno
