= Charles Edwards Lester =

American lawyer (1815–1890)

Charle Edwards Lester
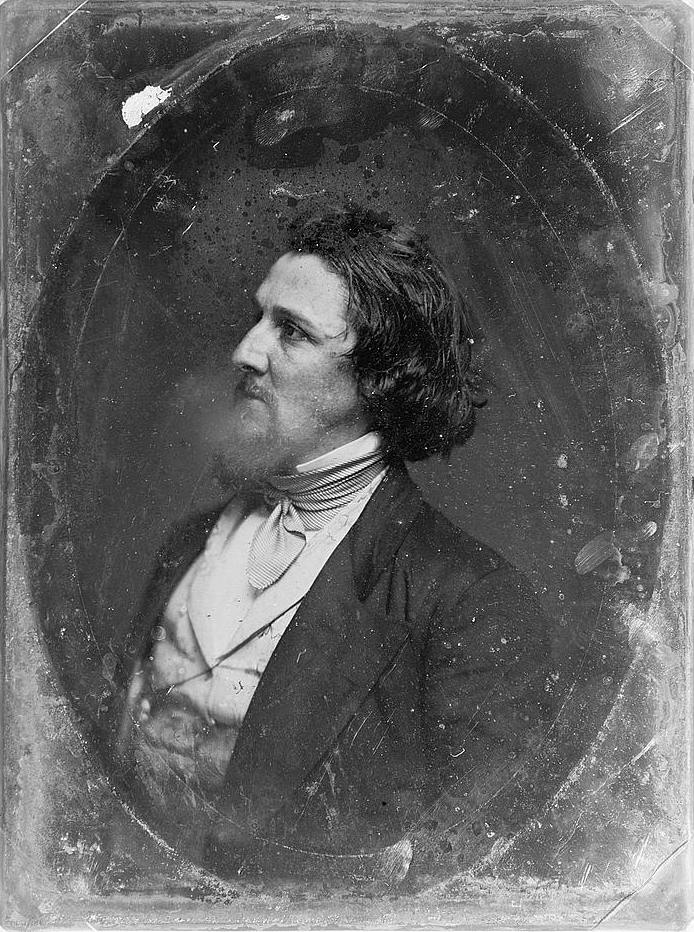
- Born: c. 1815; Griswold, Connecticut
- Died: 1890
- Occupation: Writer
- Known for: Abolitionism

Charles Edwards Lester or C. Edwards Lester (c. 1815–1890) was an American author and diplomat.

Lester was born in Griswold, Connecticut, a descendant of Jonathan Edwards. He was of a roving disposition and traveled widely in the United States and Europe. He was admitted to the bar in Mississippi and later was ordained a minister in the Presbyterian church.

In 1840, he addressed antislavery meetings in Massachusetts and was elected a delegate to the London antislavery conference of that year. He remained in England after the close of the conference. His The Glory and Shame of England, published in New York in 1841, criticized England's antislavery professions. In 1842, President Tyler appointed Lester United States Consul at Genoa.

== Books ==
- The Life of Vespucius (1845; new edition, 1905)
- The Artist, The Merchant, and the Statesman of the age of the Medici and of Our own Times (two volumes, 1845)
- Sam Houston and His Republic (1846)
- The Artists of America : a series of biographical sketches of American Artists (1846)
- My Consulship (two volumes, 1851)
- The Napoleon Dynasty (1852)
- The Life of Sam Houston (1855)
- Passages from the History of the United States (1866)
- ‘’Our First Hundred Years’’ (1874)
- America's Advancement, or the Progress of the United States during their First Century (1875)
- The Mexican Republic (1878)
- a Life of Charles Sumner (1874)
- Life and character of Peter Cooper (1883)

== Gallery ==
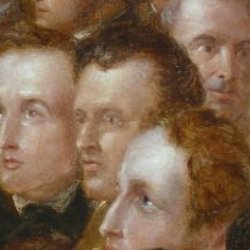
Charles Edwards Lester C. 1840

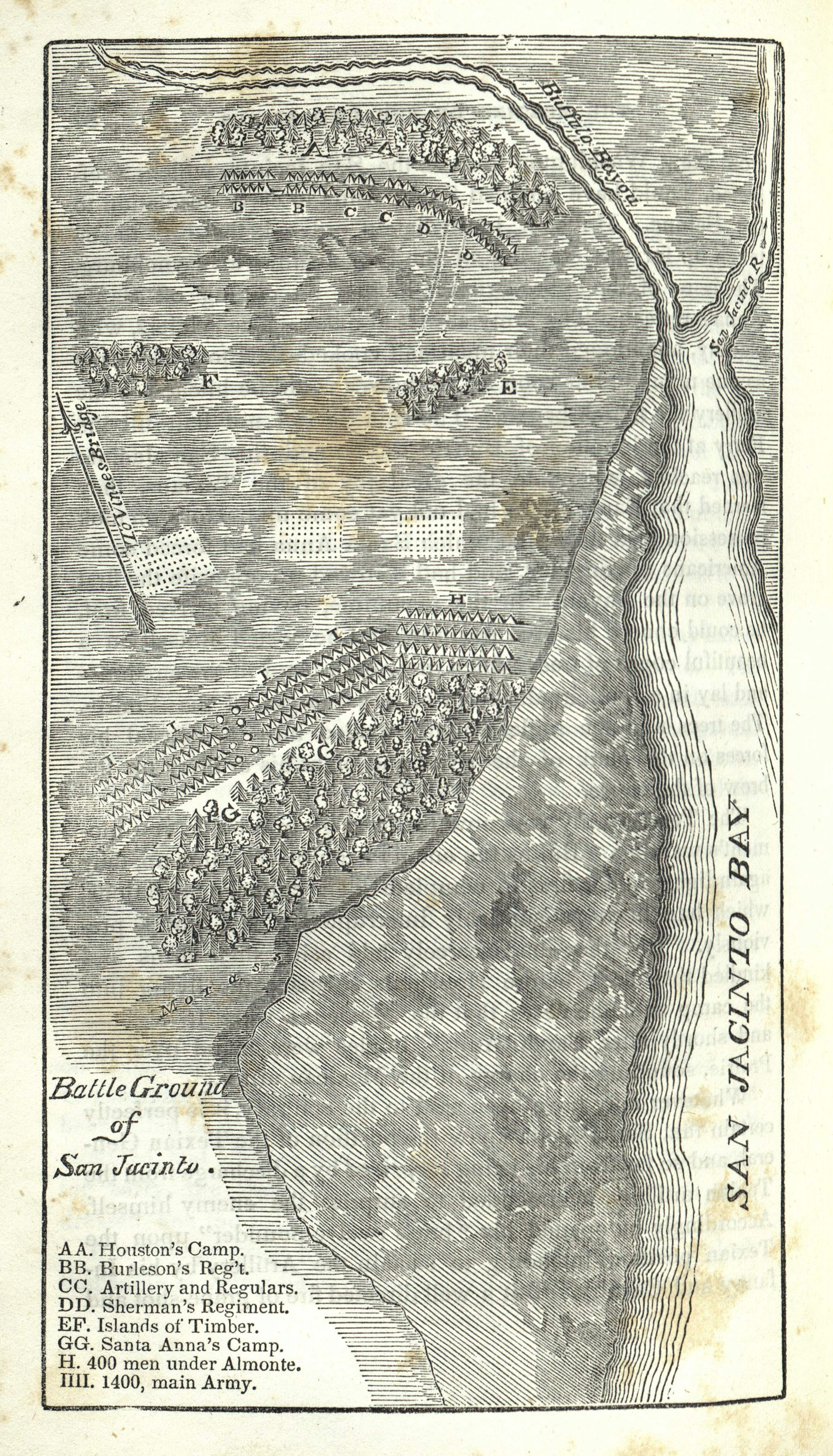
Lester's 1846 map, Battle Ground of San Jacinto
