= Sarra Copia Sullam =

Italian poet and writer (1588/1590–1641)

Sarra Copia Sulam (Sara Copio)
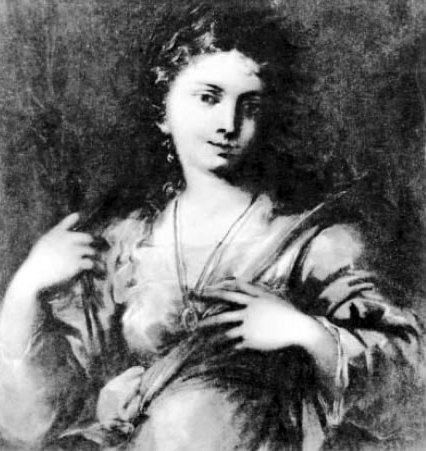
- Born: 1588/1590; Venice
- Died: February 1641
- Occupations: Poet and writer

Sarra Copia Sullam (Sara Copio, 1588/1590–1641) was an Italian poet and writer who lived in Italy in the late 16th and early 17th centuries. She was Jewish and very well educated. Despite being married, for many years she had what appears to have been an extremely close relationship, by correspondence only, with a writer, Ansaldo Cebà, whom she admired but whom she never actually met. He was a Christian, and at that point in his life he had become a monk. He appears to have fallen in love with Sarra, and constantly urged her to convert to Christianity, but she resisted.

In 1621, Sarra was accused of a serious crime of belief, a heresy, and was in danger of trial by Inquisition. She received almost no support from many of her friends, including Cebà. She died of natural causes in 1641. Of her writings, a number of her sonnets and her Manifesto (a response to the accusation of heresy) are all that have survived to the present day.

== Early life ==
Sarra was born in Venice between 1588 and 1590 to a Jewish family. Her parents, Simon and Ricca Copia, had two more daughters, Rachel and Esther. Sarra was given a basic education in both Jewish and Italian cultures, and learned several languages including Ancient Greek, Latin and Hebrew. Sara’s father died around 1603. In her poetry, Sarra demonstrated her knowledge of both the Old Testament and the New Testament, as well as her familiarity with the works of Aristotle and Josephus. She started writing poetry in Italian at a young age and continued for the rest of her life.

Around 1613 she married Giacobbe Sullam, who had Modenese ancestry. Apart from her daughter Rebecca, who died at only ten months, and an aborted birth, she does not appear to have had any other children. She and her husband loved the arts, and invited to their home both Christian and Jewish writers, poets, intellectuals, artists, and clerics. She was described as a woman who "revelled in the realm of beauty, and crystallized her enthusiasm in graceful, sweet, maidenly verses. Young, lovely, of generous impulses and keen intellectual powers, her ambition set upon lofty attainments, a favorite of the muses, Sarra Copia charmed youth and age." Angelico Aprosio would later report that "Men of letters not only from nearby but from Treviso, Padua, Vicenza and even more distant places competed for the chance to hear [Sarra] speak".

== Sarra and Ansaldo Cebà ==
In 1618, Sarra read the book La Reina Ester (Queen Esther), a drama written by an author called Ansaldo Cebà. Twenty seven years her senior, Ansaldo Cebà had been a diplomat when he was younger, but had decided to spend the rest of his life living as a monk. He had gone on retreat in one of Genoa's monasteries.

Cebà's book made a great impression on Sarra, and so she wrote a letter to him. In the letter she admitted that she carried the book with her all the time, and even slept with it. Cebà responded to Sarra's letter, and this was the start of four years of letters, gifts and poems, exchanged between the two.

Ansaldo Cebà wrote to Sarra that he wanted to help her convert to Christianity. He was aware of how beautiful Sarra was, because his servant, whom he sent with presents for her, had told him so. And on one occasion Sarra sent Cebà her portrait, writing: "This is the picture of one who carries yours deeply graven on her heart, and, with finger pointing to her bosom, tells the world: "Here dwells my idol, bow before him.""

Eventually Ansaldo's desire to convert Sarra to Christianity became something more significant: it seems he fell in love with her, a love that was not necessarily just platonic. Their correspondence became more intimate, with some physical allusions and some sexual implications. It was as if they both were playing a game of love, although nothing was ever completely spelled out. Ansaldo wrote to Sarra that if she would convert to Christianity, after death they would be united in Heaven.

Sarra's name was originally spelled "Coppia" meaning "pair" or "couple", and in one of Cebà's letters to her, he said that the two letter "p"s in her name were an indication that the two of them could indeed become a couple, despite the fact that he was a Catholic monk and she was married. After that, Sarra started spelling her name with a single "p": Copia. All the way to the end of their correspondence, Cebà tried to convert Sarra; this became the greatest desire of a man who was getting older and whose health was now failing. However, Sarra never submitted to his wish. She did however give Ansaldo permission to pray for her conversion to Christianity, and in return he allowed her to pray for his conversion to Judaism. Sarra and Ansaldo never actually met.

In 1623, Cebà published 53 letters that he had written to Sarra. Sarra's letters to Cebà were never published, and are lost.

== The Manifesto ==
Baldassarre Bonifacio was a prominent Christian cleric who had been a guest at Sarra and her husband's receptions. In 1621, he wrote a treatise Dell’Immortalità dell'anima (On the Immortality of the Soul). According to Bonifacio's account, two years before that, Sarra had caused him to realize that she did not believe in the immortality of the soul. This was a very serious accusation of a crime of belief which could have resulted in a trial by inquisition.

In response, Sarra at once wrote a work entitled, Manifesto di Sarra Copia Sulam hebrea Nel quale è da lei riprovate, e detestata l'opinione negante l'Immortalità dell'Anima, falsemente attribuitale da SIG. BALDASSARE BONIFACIO (The Manifesto of Sarra Copia Sulam, a Jewish woman, in which she refutes and disavows the opinion denying immortality of the soul, falsely attributed to her by Signor Baldassare Bonifacio). The Manifesto was dedicated to her beloved father, who died when she was 16 years old. In this work she defended her points of view, and attacked Bonifacio.

At the beginning of her response to Bonifacio's accusation was the following poem:

O Lord, Thou know'st my inmost hope and thought,

Thou know'st whene'er before Thy judgment throne
I shed salt tears, and uttered many a moan.
Twas not for vanities that I besought.
O turn on me Thy look with mercy fraught,
And see how envious malice makes me groan!
The pall upon my heart by error thrown,
Remove; illume me with Thy radiant thought.
At truth let not the wicked scorner mock,
O Thou, that breath'dst in me a spark divine.
The lying tongue's deceit with silence blight,
Protect me from its venom, Thou, my Rock,
And show the spiteful sland'rer by this sign

That Thou dost shield me with Thy endless might

Sarra sent a copy of the Manifesto to Cebà, but he responded to her only after a few months delay, and instead of offering her help, he once again urged her to convert to Christianity. This was the last letter that Cebà, who died soon after, wrote to Sarra.

Sarra Copia Sulam was the victim of a sordid “gaslighting” plot, which is recorded in the Avviso di Parnaso, an unpublished document preserved in the Correr Museum in the Napoleonic Wing of the Piazza San Marco in Venice. The lady had hired a villain named Numidio Paluzzi as a tutor and he, together with Alessandro Berardelli and others, committed a series of thefts in Copia’s house. Paluzzi then made her believe that the thefts were the work of ghosts, and, in addition, sent her a fake love letter from a Frenchman with whom she was supposedly in love, revealing to her the presence of a spirit capable of establishing contact with her lover in Paris.

In a short time the affair was on everyone’s lips and finally it reached the ears of Copia herself, who reported everything to the Signori della Notte al Criminàl, the criminal court of Venice which held its sessions during the night. Berardelli was arrested, and Copia fired Paluzzi. This was not enough to stop the wickedness of the two men, who disseminated a satire against her entitled La Sarreide (The Lost Woman). Berardelli later published a collection of rhymes by Paluzzi, who had died some time before, including the sonnets sent by Copio to Cebà because, according to the slanders of Berardelli, the real author was Paluzzi himself, whom Copia had robbed of his works while he was on his deathbed. After this event, there is no further information about him. The date of Copia’s death is attested by the Necrologio Ebrei of the Provveditori alla Sanità. Many of her friends and teachers stopped supporting her during her time of need in 1621. Not until 1625 did an anonymous author publish papers in her defense.

Sarra died in February 1641, after a three-month illness.
